= Elisabeth Berenberg =

German banker and heiress

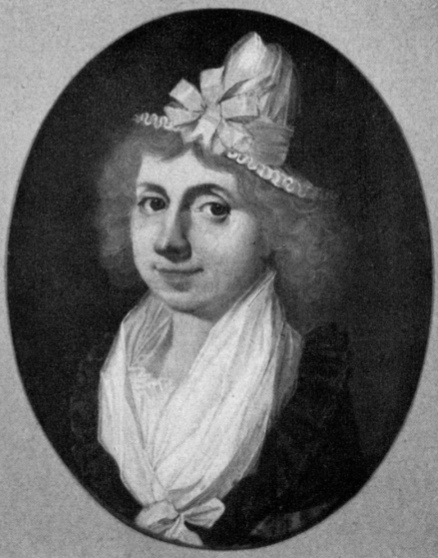
- Born: 2 December 1749
- Died: 16 January 1822 (aged 72)
- Occupation: Heiress

Elisabeth Berenberg (2 December 1749 – 16 January 1822) was a German heiress from Hamburg, merchant banker and a member of the Berenberg family. She was the last male line member of the Flemish-origined Hanseatic Berenberg banking family in Hamburg, and ancestral mother of the von Berenberg-Gossler family, the current owners of Berenberg Bank. She is also noted as the only woman ever to serve as a partner and take an active leadership role (1790–1800) at Berenberg Bank since the company was established in 1590 by her family.

== Biography ==
She belonged to the Berenberg family, a Flemish-origined family from Antwerp in today's Belgium, who came as religious refugees to Hamburg in 1585, where they founded Berenberg Bank and became, together with the closely related Amsinck family, one of the two most prominent families of the city-state's ruling class of Hanseaten. She was the daughter of owner of Berenberg Bank Johann Berenberg (1718–1772) and Anna Maria Lastrop (1723–1761), and was named for her grandmother Anna Elisabeth Amsinck (1690–1748). Her grandfather Rudolf Berenberg (1680–1746) was elected a Senator in 1735 and her great-grandfather Cornelius Berenberg (1634–1711) had become an hereditary grand burgher in 1684 and developed the Berenberg merchant house into a highly successful merchant bank. She was also descended from numerous other prominent merchant and banking families, such as the Welser family.

Her only brother Rudolf Berenberg (1748–1768) was possibly mentally ill and died at 20 in Suriname, where his father had sent him to manage the family's business interests, and her uncle, Senator Paul Berenberg (1716–1768), died without heirs in the same year. Elisabeth Berenberg thus remained as the only heiress of Berenberg Bank. In 1768, she married Johann Hinrich Gossler (1738–1790), who had joined Berenberg Bank as an apprentice, and her father made Gossler a partner in 1769. After Johann Berenberg's death, Gossler became the sole owner and head of the company. The historian (and descendant) Percy Ernst Schramm describes their marriage as a marriage of convenience; she was not considered beautiful, but was intelligent, cultivated, kind, spoke many languages (including Latin) and became an exemplary wife and mother. She survived her husband by 32 years and after his death in 1790 managed the firm together with her son-in-law until 31 December 1800, from which point the company was run by her son-in-law and her son alone. She however retained a large account with the Berenberg company of several hundred thousand Mark Banco until her death. The company's name was changed to Joh. Berenberg, Gossler & Co. in 1791.

She was the mother of Anna Henriette Gossler (1771–1836), who married Ludwig Erdwin Seyler (1758–1836), and of Senator Johann Heinrich Gossler (1775–1842). Her son-in-law, Seyler, became a partner in 1788 and head of Berenberg Bank in 1790. Her son Johann Heinrich Gossler joined the bank as a partner in 1798. Her grandson Hermann Gossler (1802–1877) became First Mayor and President of the Senate (head of state), whereas her great-grandson, Baron Johann von Berenberg-Gossler, was granted the name Berenberg-Gossler by the Senate of Hamburg in 1880, and subsequently ennobled by Prussia in 1888 and raised to baronial rank in 1910.

From 1793 until her death in 1822, she used the Frustberg manor house as summer residence.

Percy Ernst Schramm describes her as "a Maria Theresia in miniature" and "a practical woman, who until the end governed her family with undiminished vitality." Her daughter Anna Henriette Gossler, married Seyler, once wrote that "we all love and revere her indescribably; she also deserves it entirely, because she only lives for her children. She is very alive and bright for her age." She was well educated and made sure that both her daughters and sons also received a very good education.

== Ancestry ==
Ancestors of Elisabeth Berenberg

16. Hans Berenberg (1593–1640), merchant
8. Cornelius Berenberg (1634–1711), merchant banker
17. Adelheid Ruhlant (1611–1684)
4. Rudolf Berenberg (1680–1746), Senator, merchant banker
18. Daniel Colin (1616–1660), merchant
9. Anna Margaretha Colin (1649–1684)
19. Catharina Elisabeth Adelheid Engels (1620–1659)
2. Johann Berenberg (1718–1772), merchant banker
20. Rudolf Amsinck (b. 1614)
10. Paul Amsinck (1649–1706), merchant of Hamburg and Lisbon
21. Anna Jenisch (b. 1623)
5. Anna Elisabeth Amsinck (1690–1748)
22. Rudolf Capell (1635–1684), Professor
11. Christina Adelheid Capelle (1663–1730)
23. Anna Berenberg (1639–1669)
1. Elisabeth Berenberg
24. Wichmann Lastrop (d. 1667), merchant
12. Peter Lastrop (1665–1709), merchant
25. Elisabeth Kempe
6. Wichmann Lastrop (1696–1747), merchant of Hamburg
26. Moritz Tietgens (1641–1690), merchant
13. Anna Maria Tietgens (1677–1716)
27. Anna Maria Trebbe (1646–1701)
3. Anna Maria Lastrop (1723–1761)
28. Johann Tönnies (b. 1637), merchant
14. Johann Friedrich Tönnies (1662–1736), merchant
29. Dorothea Erhorn
7. Ilsabe Tönnies (1702–1739)
30. Diedrich Wolpmann (1636–1685)
15. Alma Wolpmann (1671–1746)
31. Anna Rouwe (1642–1705)

== Gallery ==
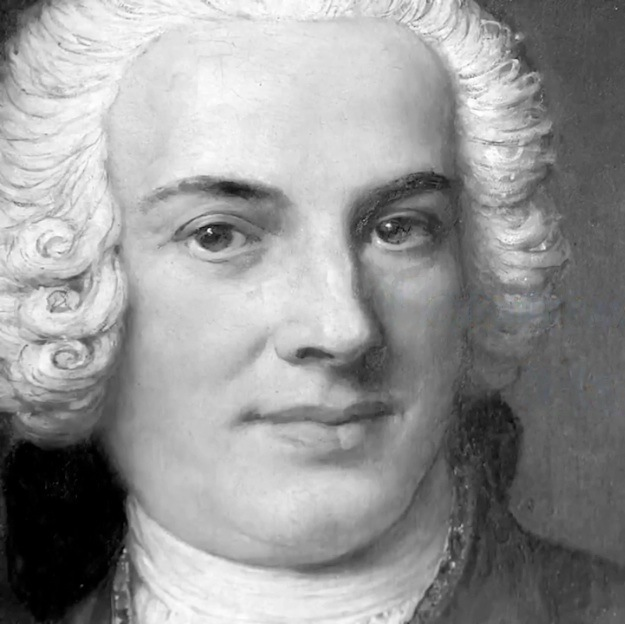
Her father, Johann Berenberg (1718–1772)

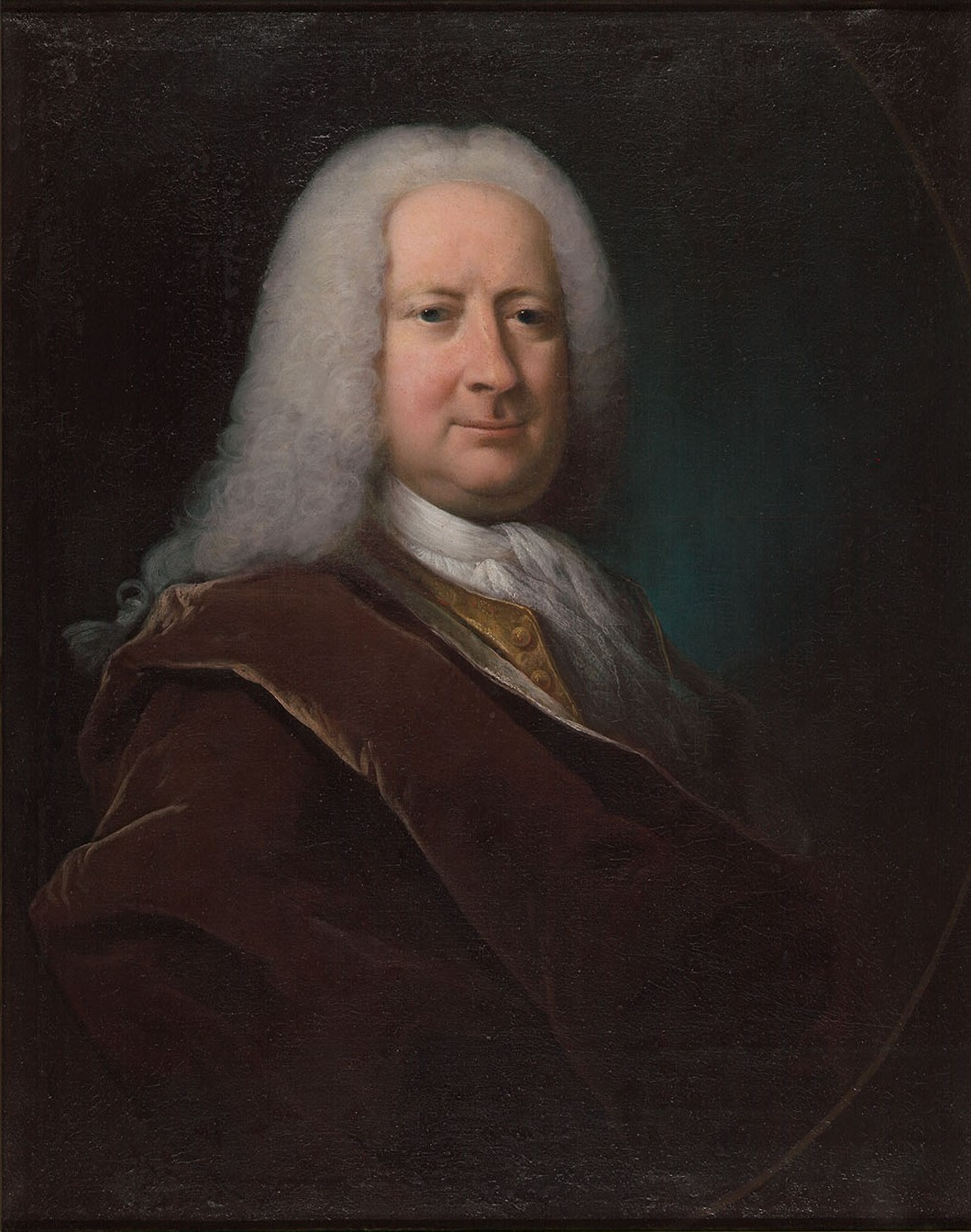
Her great-grandfather, Hamburg merchant Johann Friedrich Tönnies (1662–1736)

Her great-great-great-grandfather, Hamburg Senator Rudolf Amsinck (1577–1636)

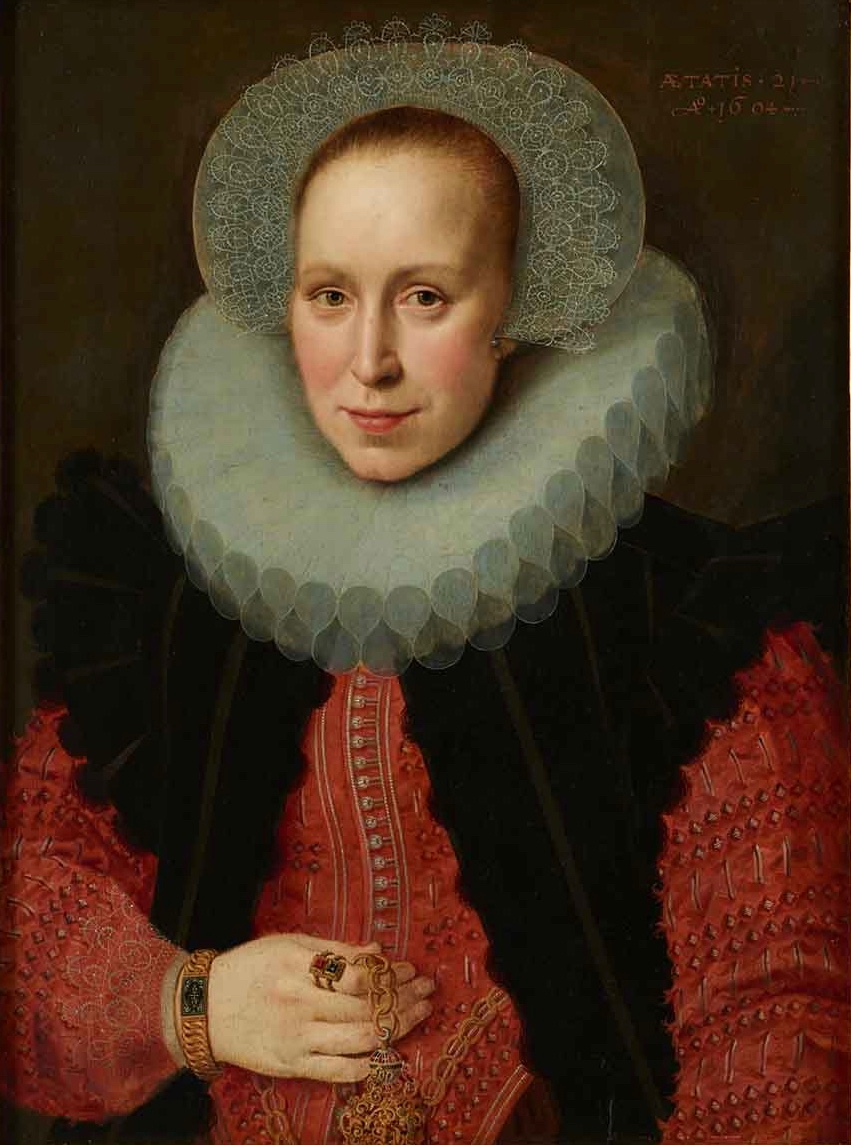
Her great-great-great-grandmother, Isabeau (Isabella) de Hertoghe (1583–1636), a member of one of the seven noble houses of Brussels

== Literature ==
- Joh. Berenberg, Gossler & Co.: Die Geschichte eines deutschen Privatbankhauses, Berenberg Bank, Hamburg 1990
- Percy Ernst Schramm, Kaufleute zu Haus und über See. Hamburgische Zeugnisse des 17., 18. und 19. Jahrhunderts, Hamburg, Hoffmann und Campe, 1949
- Percy Ernst Schramm, Neun Generationen: Dreihundert Jahre deutscher Kulturgeschichte im Lichte der Schicksale einer Hamburger Bürgerfamilie (1648–1948), Vol. 1, Göttingen, 1963.
- Percy Ernst Schramm, "Kaufleute während Besatzung, Krieg und Belagerung (1806–1815) : der Hamburger Handel in der Franzosenzeit, dargestellt an Hand von Firmen- und Familienpapieren." Tradition: Zeitschrift für Firmengeschichte und Unternehmerbiographie, Vol. 4. Jahrg., No. 1. (Feb 1959), pp. 1–22. https://www.jstor.org/stable/40696638
- Percy Ernst Schramm, "Hamburger Kaufleute in der 2. Hälfte des 18. Jahrhunderts," in: Tradition. Zeitschrift für Firmengeschichte und Unternehmerbiographie 1957, No 4., pp. 307–332. https://www.jstor.org/stable/40696554
