= Anna Henriette Gossler =

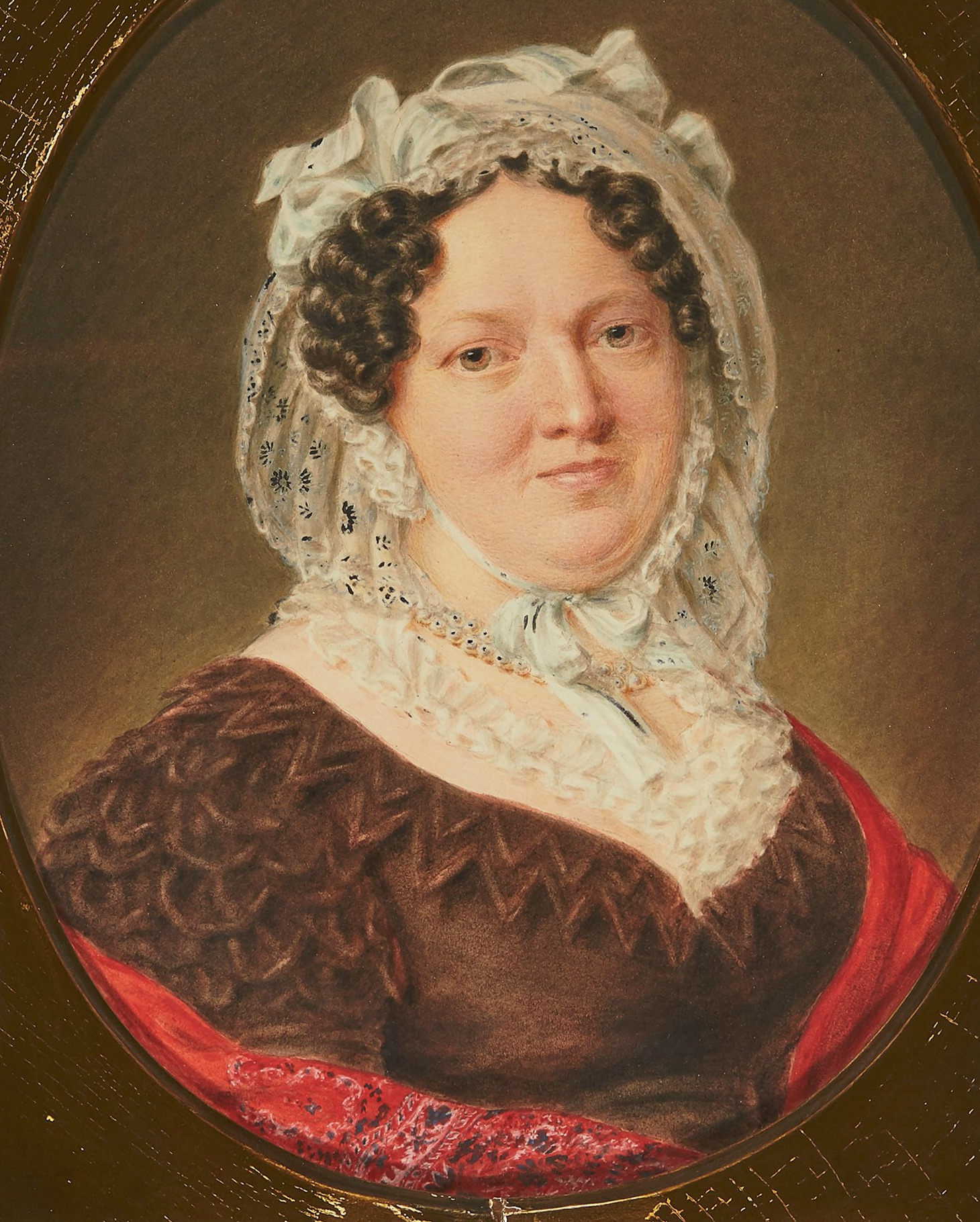
- Born: 7 November 1771; Hamburg
- Died: 2 August 1836 (aged 64); Hamburg
- Spouse: Ludwig Erdwin Seyler
- Parents: Johann Hinrich Gossler (father); Elisabeth Berenberg (mother)

Anna Henriette Gossler (7 November 1771 – 2 August 1836) was a Hamburg banker, heiress and socialite.

== Biography ==
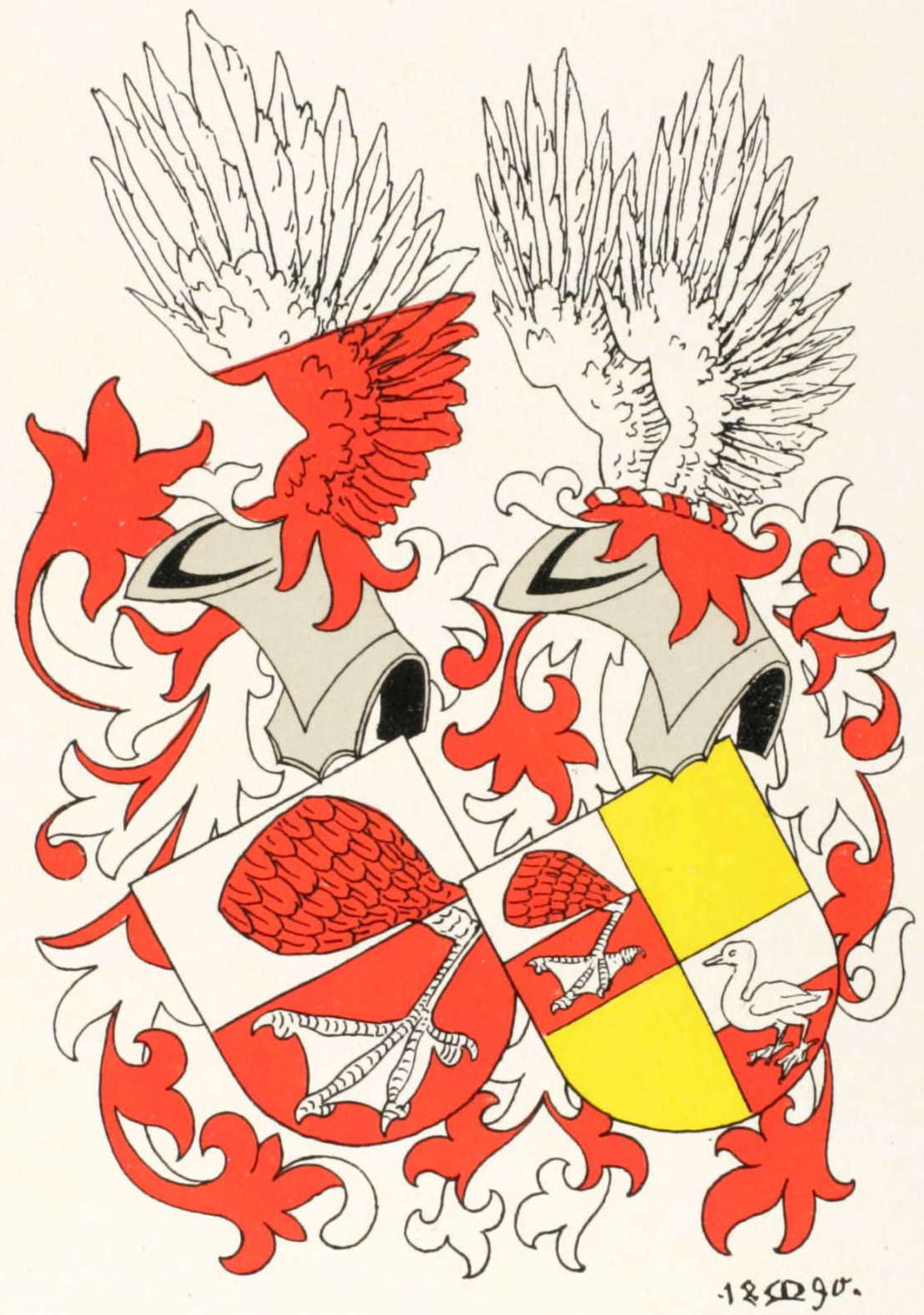
The coat of arms of the Gossler family; the version adopted by her father in 1773 to the left; the version used from the early 19th century to the right

Gossler was born in Hamburg. Anna Henriette Gossler, who went by the name of Henriette, was a member of the Hanseatic Berenberg/Gossler banking family, arguably the most prominent family of the then independent city-state of Hamburg alongside the related Amsinck family. She was the oldest daughter of the bankers Johann Hinrich Gossler and Elisabeth Berenberg, owners of Berenberg Bank, which had been founded by her family in 1590.

On 20 May 1788, she married her father's employee Ludwig Erdwin Seyler, who immediately was made a partner in the bank and remained so until his death nearly half a century later. After the death of her father in 1790 her husband became head of the company. Particularly in the years around the Napoleonic Wars she and her husband played prominent roles in Hamburg high society and politics, and Berenberg Bank was headquartered in their private home.

She was the older sister of Hamburg senator Johann Heinrich Gossler and the aunt of Hamburg First Mayor (head of state) Hermann Gossler. Her father-in-law was the theatre principal Abel Seyler, the leading patron of German theatre in the late 18th century. Her youngest daughter Henriette Seyler was married to the Norwegian industrialist Benjamin Wegner.

== Ancestry ==
Ancestors of Anna Henriette Gossler

Jacob Gossler, burgher of Hamburg
Johan Eibert Gossler, burgher of Hamburg
Anna Margaretha Voigt
Johann Hinrich Gossler, owner of Berenberg Bank
Jürgen Friedrich Boedecker, merchant of Hamburg
Catharina Lucretia Boedecker
Anna Magdalene Tiefbrunn
Anna Henriette Gossler
Rudolf Berenberg, Hamburg Senator and owner of Berenberg Bank
Johann Berenberg, owner of Berenberg Bank
Anna Elisabeth Amsinck
Elisabeth Berenberg, owner of Berenberg Bank
Wichmann Lastrop, merchant of Hamburg
Anna Maria Lastrop
Ilsabe Tönnies
