= Berenberg Bank =

Multinational full-service investment bank

Joh. Berenberg, Gossler & Co.

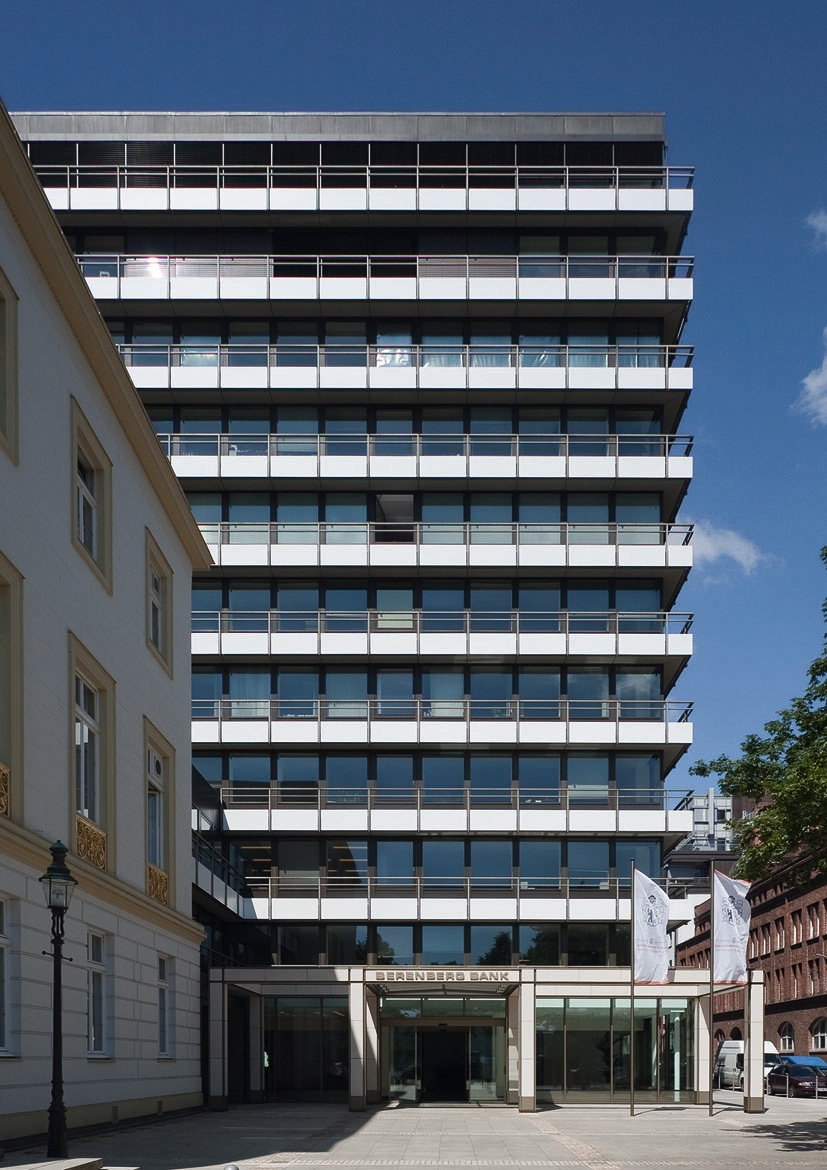
- Headquarters in Hamburg
- Trade name: Berenberg
- Type: Private limited partnership with personally liable partners
- Industry: Financial services
- Founded: September 1590; 436 years ago
- Founders: Hans and Paul Berenberg
- Headquarters: Hamburg, Germany
- Area served: Worldwide
- Key people: Hendrik Riehmer; David Mortlock; Christian Kühn; Hans-Walter Peters
- Products: Investment banking, wealth management, asset management, corporate banking
- Number of employees: c. 1,600
- Website: berenberg.de

Joh. Berenberg, Gossler & Co. KG, commonly known as Berenberg Bank and also branded as simply Berenberg, is a German multinational full-service private and merchant bank headquartered in Hamburg, Germany. It is considered the world's oldest merchant bank.

It was founded around 1590 by Hans and Paul Berenberg, Protestant Flemish refugees from Antwerp in the Spanish Netherlands (now Belgium). Their descendants, the Berenberg and Gossler families, belonged to the ruling elite of Hanseatic merchants of the city-republic of Hamburg and several family members served in the city-state's government from 1735. Like many other merchant bankers, the Berenbergs were originally cloth merchants. The company involved itself in shipping, whaling and ship insurance from the late 19th century, and in extensive trade with colonial goods imported from the Americas and Asia. By the early 19th century the company was one of Northern Europe's leading sugar merchants. During the 18th and 19th centuries the company focused increasingly on financial services. The company's name refers to Johann Berenberg, his son-in-law Johann Hinrich Gossler and the latter's son-in-law L.E. Seyler, and has remained unchanged since 1791. The bank has operated continuously since 1590 and is still part-owned by members of the Berenberg-Gossler family. As of 2023, the family's share was about 30%.

Berenberg Bank is active in investment banking, particularly pan-European equity research, brokerage and equity capital markets transactions, in addition to private banking for wealthy customers, asset management and corporate banking. Since 1876, the company has increasingly focused on investment banking. Berenberg Bank has around 1,670 employees; in addition to its headquarters in Hamburg, it has significant presences in London, Frankfurt and New York City, and 16 further offices in Europe and the Americas. After years of expanding its activities in London, which is now home to its second largest office with a staff of around 500 and seat of most of its investment banking activities, Berenberg Bank has recently focused on expanding in the United States and Asia.

The bank is organized as a limited partnership with personally liable partners, and is noted for its conservative business strategy. After the 2008 financial crisis, the bank has expanded rapidly. The former senior partner and head of the bank Hans-Walter Peters was also president of the Association of German Banks from 2016 to 2021, having succeeded Deutsche Bank CEO Jürgen Fitschen. In 2018 Berenberg Bank, in line with its increasing focus on investment banking, sold its Swiss private banking subsidiary Berenberg Bank (Schweiz) AG to a group of investors; the Swiss company became known as Bergos. From 2021 to 2026, the bank was run by the managing partners Hendrik Riehmer, David Mortlock, and Christian Kühn. In June 2026, the BaFin ordered their removal after indications of possible corporate‑governance violations emerged during the audit of the 2025 financial statements. BaFin suspended their powers on 19 June 2026 and appointed two special commissioners, Hans‑Walter Peters and Michael Horf, to assume management responsibilities.

== History ==
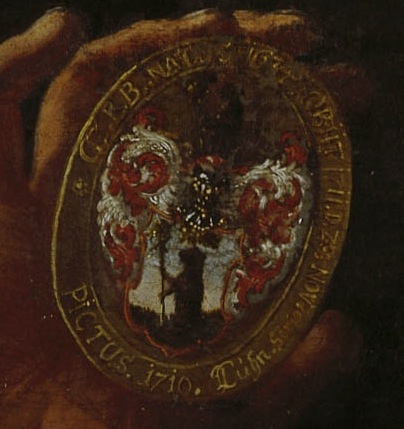
Coat of arms of the Berenberg family (detail, 1710)

The Berenberg Company was founded in Hamburg in 1590 by the brothers Hans (1561–1626) and Paul Berenberg (1566–1645). In 1585, the Protestant Berenbergs left Antwerp in the Duchy of Brabant (today's Belgium), at the time one of Europe's commercial centres, as Protestants in the southern Low Countries were given the choice either to convert to Catholicism or leave the country. The bank has been continuously owned by their descendants ever since.

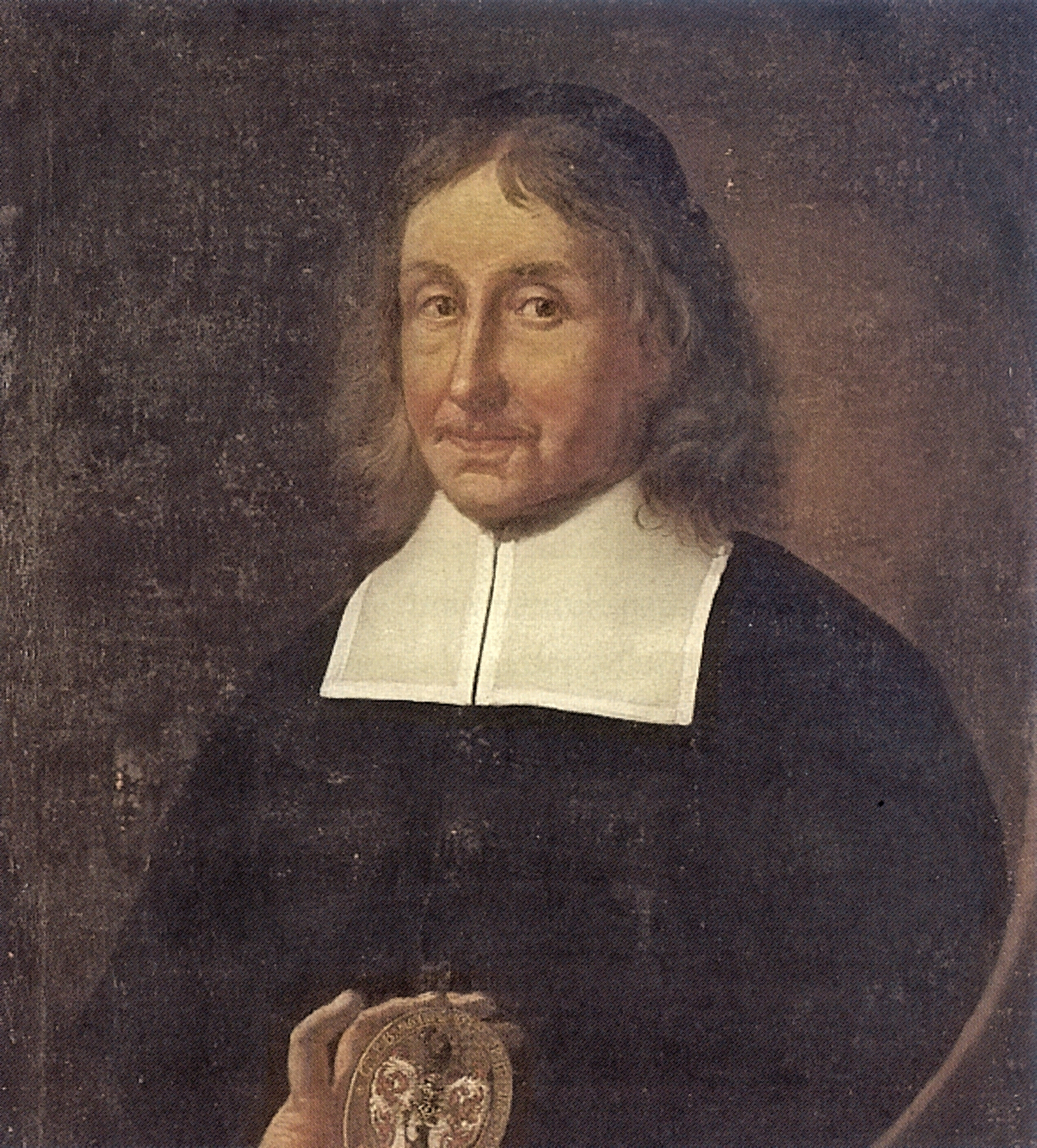
Cornelius Berenberg (1634–1711)

The Berenbergs were originally cloth merchants and quickly extended their business to other commodities. Hans Berenberg's grandson Cornelius Berenberg (1634–1711) was the first to engage in merchant banking and developed the company into a very successful merchant house and merchant bank. He forged trade links with France, Spain, Portugal, Italy, Scandinavia and Russia. Family connections of the Berenbergs were instrumental to the development, especially in Livorno and Lisbon with their colonies of wealthy Dutch merchants. Members of the Berenberg family were also merchants in London from the 17th century.

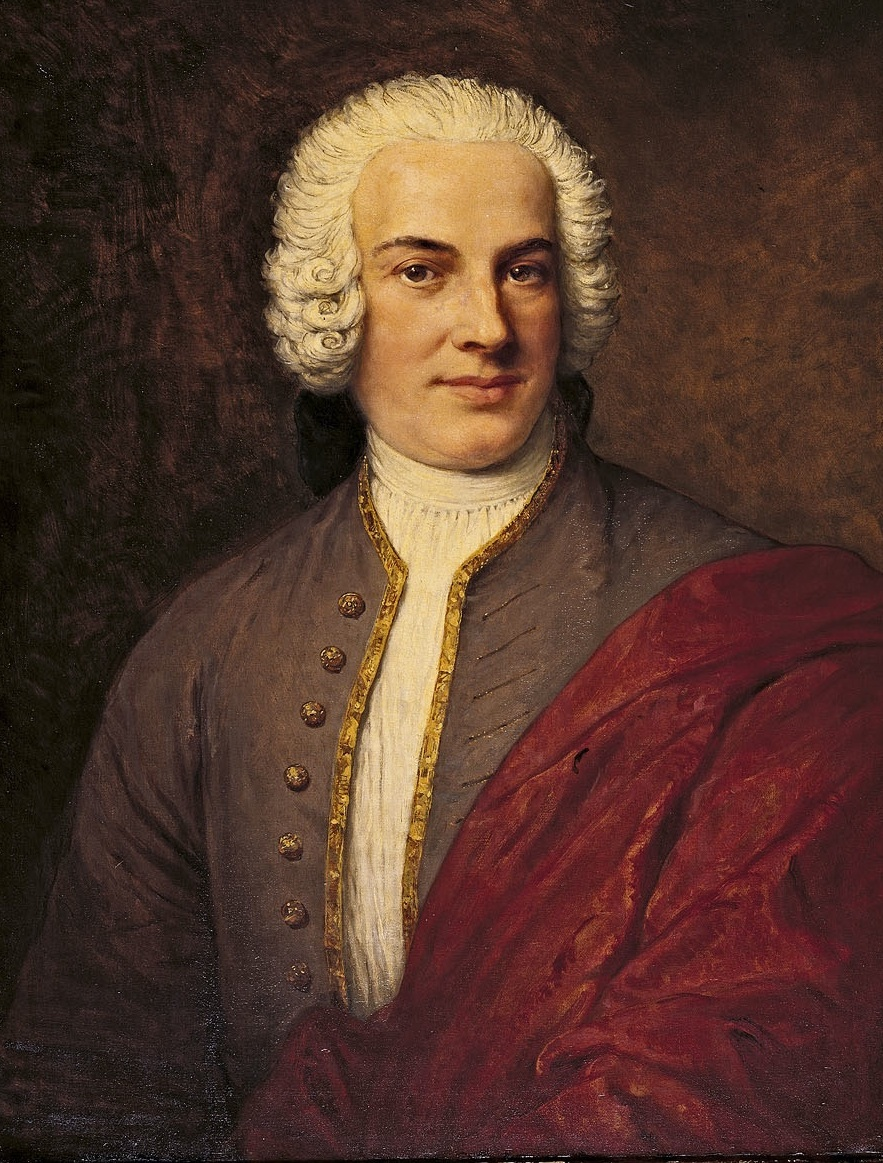
Johann Berenberg (1718–1772)

Cornelius Berenberg's son, Rudolf Berenberg (1680–1746), was elected a senator, that is, a member of the government of the city-state, in 1735. By the mid 18th century, investment banking and acceptance credits comprised a significant part of the firm's activities. Rudolf Berenberg was married to Anna Elisabeth Amsinck (1690–1748), a daughter of the Lisbon and Hamburg merchant Paul Amsinck (1649–1706) and a descendant of the Welser family. Their sons, Senator Paul Berenberg (1716–1768) and Johann Berenberg (1718–1772), became owners of the Berenberg company.

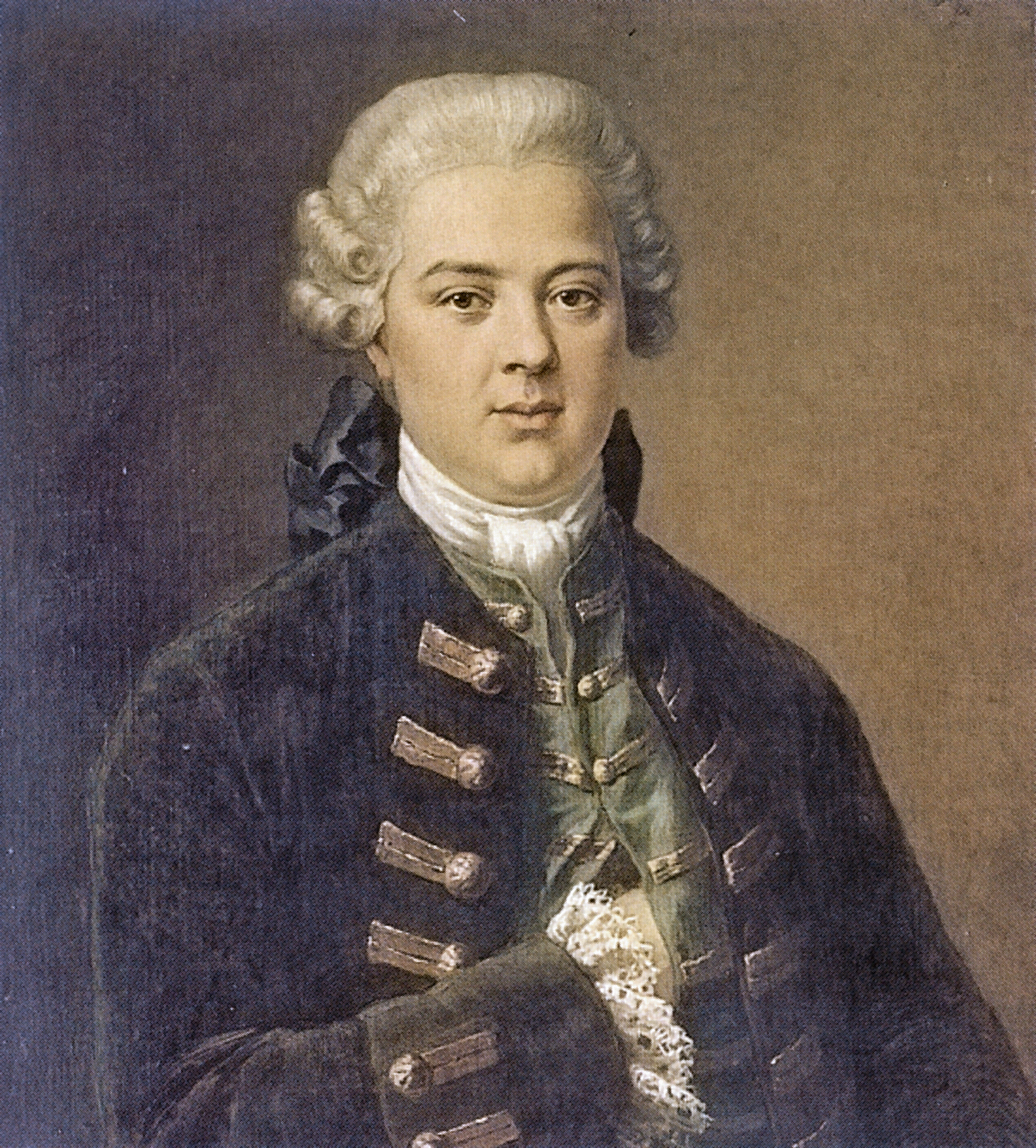
Johann Hinrich Gossler (1738–1790)

In 1768 Senator Paul Berenberg died childless, while his brother Johann Berenberg lost his only son in the same year. To ensure the continuation of the firm, Johann Berenberg took on his son-in-law Johann Hinrich Gossler (1738–90) as a new partner in 1769; he had married Berenberg's only daughter Elisabeth Berenberg (1749–1822) the previous year. The Gossler family is known since the 17th century, when Johann Hinrich Gossler's great-grandfather was a Hamburg burgher. Elisabeth Berenberg was the last member of the Hamburg Berenberg family, which became extinct in the male line upon her death in 1822. Johann Hinrich Gossler and Elisabeth Berenberg were the founders of the Berenberg-Gossler family, which rose to great prominence in Hamburg from the late 18th century. In the 19th-century city republic of Hamburg the (Berenberg-)Gossler family and the closely related Amsinck family were widely regarded as the city state's two most prominent families.

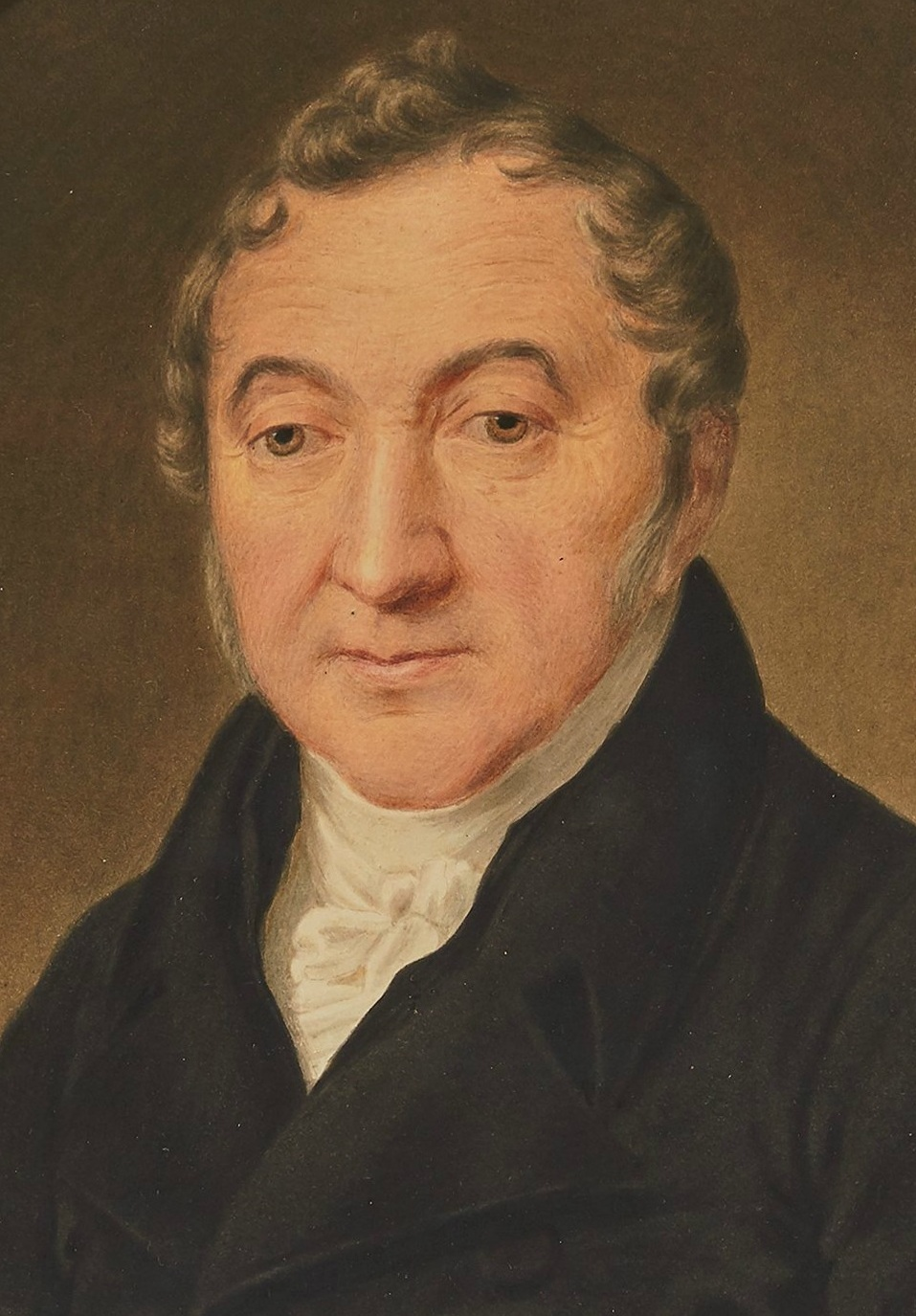
L.E. Seyler (1758–1836)

In 1788 Johann Hinrich Gossler took on a new partner, his son-in-law L.E. Seyler (1758–1836), who had married his eldest child Anna Henriette Gossler (1771–1836). From 1790, the company was led by L.E. Seyler, and his mother-in-law Elisabeth Berenberg was a partner in her own right from 1790 to 1800. L.E. Seyler, a son of the famous theatre director Abel Seyler, was one of Hamburg's foremost merchants in his lifetime, and served as president of the Commerz-Deputation and as a member of the city's government during the French rule of the city. To reflect Seyler joining the company, its name was changed to Joh. Berenberg, Gossler & Co. from 1 January 1791, and has remained unchanged since.

As head of the Berenberg company L.E. Seyler greatly increased the company's international trade, and was one of the first merchants and bankers from Germany who established trade relations with the newly independent United States and with East Asia. By 1800 the capital of the company had doubled since he became a partner. Seyler remained the company's senior partner for 46 years, and when he died in 1836 he had been with the company for 61 years. Seyler's seventeen years younger brother-in-law Johann Heinrich Gossler (1775–1842) joined the firm in 1798 and became a Hamburg senator in 1821. As of 1809 L.E. Seyler owned 5/12 (about 41%) of the Berenberg company and was the company's senior/managing partner and largest shareholder; his brother-in-law Johann Heinrich Gossler owned 4/12 (about 33%). The two brothers-in-law jointly led the company for decades, with Seyler as the more experienced partner and Gossler gradually taking on more responsibilities as Seyler eventually retreated into semi-retirement in the aftermath of the Napoleonic Wars.

During the Napoleonic Wars the company lost half its capital, but it emerged stronger than ever and quickly regained and surpassed its former size once the war ended. Astrid Petersson highlights Joh. Berenberg, Goßler & Co. as "an example of a significant Hamburg trading house that achieved prosperity, among other things, due to its extensive sugar imports (...) their diverse sugar import business after 1814, especially with Brazil, the U.S., and East Asia, which in part continued their trade relations from the late 18th century, likely contributed significantly to the acquisition of their wealth. In conjunction with their position as merchant bankers, this firm acquired a prestigious standing beyond the borders of Germany, a status that few trading houses had around 1830."

Anna Henriette Gossler and L.E. Seyler's children were briefly co-owners of Berenberg Bank; they have many prominent descendants in Hamburg and Norway, e.g. in the family Paus. Berenberg Bank was also involved in financing Norway's leading industrial enterprise, Blaafarveværket, whose CEO and co-owner Benjamin Wegner was Anna Henriette Gossler and L.E. Seyler's son-in-law. Anna Henriette Gossler's younger brother Johann Heinrich Gossler (II)'s son Hermann Gossler (1802–1877) was a senator and First Mayor of Hamburg. The latter's younger brother Johann Heinrich Gossler (III) (1805–1879) became a partner in the bank and was the father of Baron Johann von Berenberg-Gossler (1839–1913), who also became a partner in the bank. In 1880 the Hamburg Senate granted the latter the name of Berenberg-Gossler, and in 1888, he was ennobled in the Kingdom of Prussia as von Berenberg-Gossler. In 1910 Johann von Berenberg-Gossler was given the title baron. Baron Johann von Berenberg-Gossler was the father of John von Berenberg-Gossler (1866–1943), a senator and German ambassador in Rome.

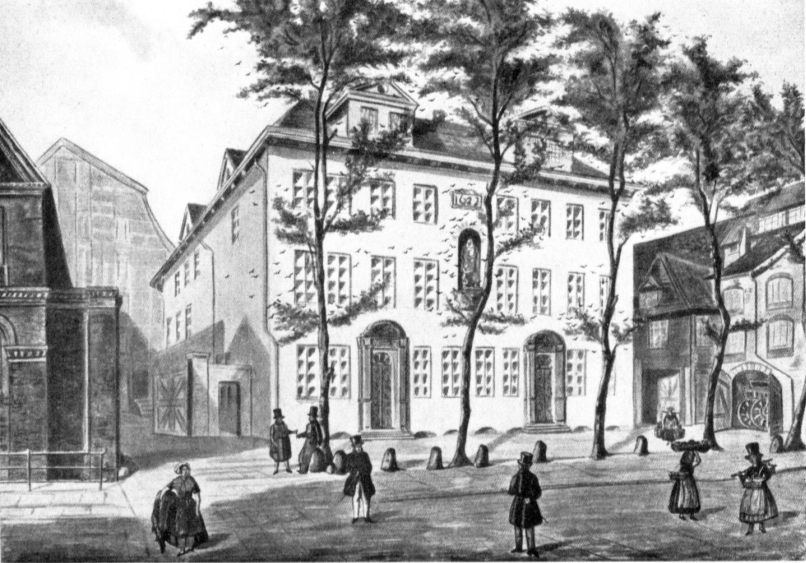
Mortzenhaus, the company's seat from 1788

In the 19th century, the bank financed the industrialisation process in Hamburg and transportation activities, and was strongly involved in the North American trade and its finance. The company was (together with the merchant house H.J. Merck & Co.) one of the main founders of Germany's largest shipping companies, the Hamburg America Line (HAPAG) in 1847 and Norddeutscher Lloyd in 1857. They were also one of the main founders of Vereinsbank Hamburg (now the HypoVereinsbank) (1857), the Ilseder Hütte ironworks (1858), and the Norddeutsche Versicherungs AG (1857). The houses of Berenberg-Gossler, H.J. Merck and Salomon Heine were also the main founders of the Norddeutsche Bank in 1856, the first joint-stock bank in northern Germany and one of the predecessors of Deutsche Bank. Furthermore, Berenberg Bank was among the founding shareholders of Bergens Privatbank (1855), the Hongkong and Shanghai Banking Corporation (1865), Den Danske Landmandsbank (1871) and Svenska Handelsbanken (1871). Berenberg Bank had a close cooperation with Barings Bank of London and was Baring's representative in Germany.

The Berenberg family and company had branches in Portugal, Italy and London from the 17th century. A branch of the Berenberg family also established the London firm Meyer & Berenberg in the 17th century and were among London's prominent West Indies merchants. In recent years Berenberg's London office in Threadneedle Street has grown rapidly to become Berenberg's second largest office, focusing on investment banking and private banking for the ultra wealthy.

In 2026, the German financial regulator BaFin removed the leadership of the Bank due to irregularities.

== Logo ==
The company's logo is a stylized version of the combined coat of arms of the Berenberg and Gossler families, featuring the Berenberg bear (adopted in the 16th century in Belgium) and the Gossler goose foot (adopted in 1773 by Johann Hinrich Gossler).

A stylized version of the combined Berenberg–Gossler coat of arms used as the logo of Berenberg Bank

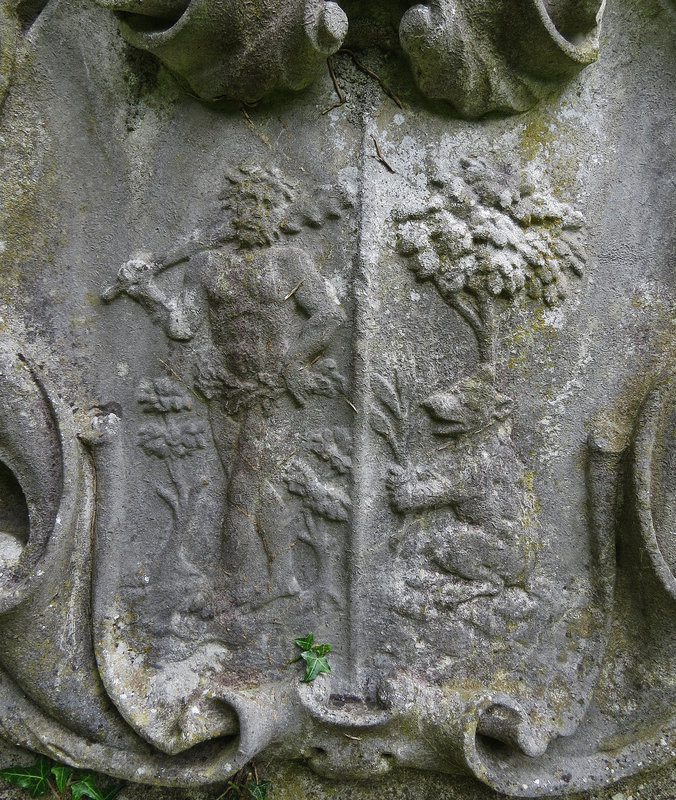
A 1727 tombstone in London (St Andrew's) featuring the Berenberg family's arms (right); it belonged to Sarah Anna Berenberg, a descendant of Berenberg Bank's founders, and her husband. She belonged to a British branch of the Berenberg family.

== Business segments ==
The bank is active in the following business segments:

- Wealth management (typically, the minimum deposit required to open or maintain an account is €1 million)
- Investment banking
- Asset management
- Corporate banking

== Branches ==
Berenberg Bank has its head office in Hamburg and significant presences in London, Frankfurt and New York City, as well as offices in Düsseldorf, Munich, Münster, Stuttgart, Brussels, Geneva, Paris, Boston, San Francisco and Chicago. In Zürich, the previous subsidiary Berenberg Bank (Schweiz) AG, has established itself as an independent Swiss Private Bank, Bergos AG, in September 2018. In 2017 Berenberg Capital Markets rented the entire 53rd floor of 1251 Avenue of the Americas in Manhattan.

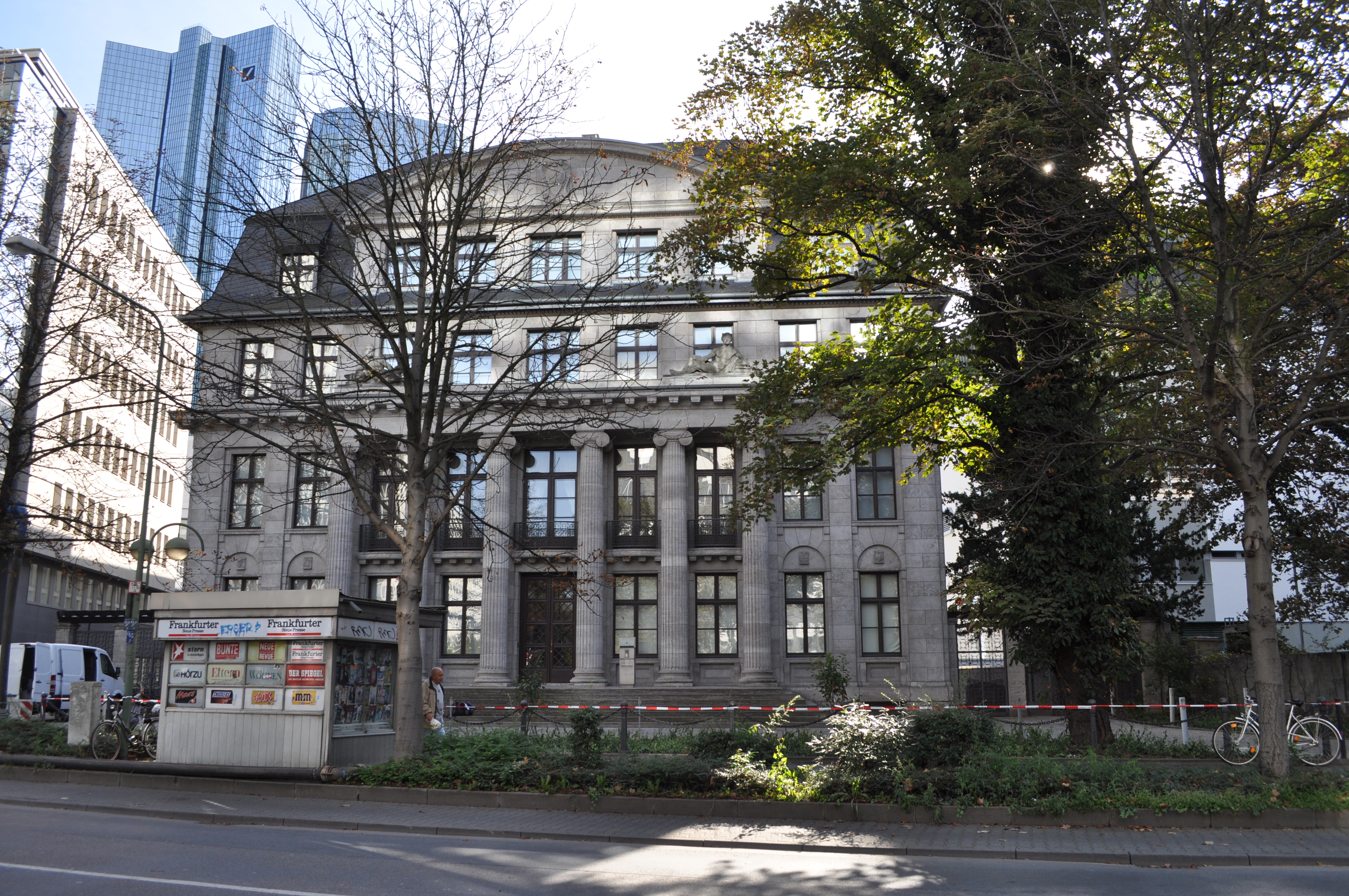
Berenberg's Frankfurt office in Bockenheimer Landstraße 25 in the Banking District

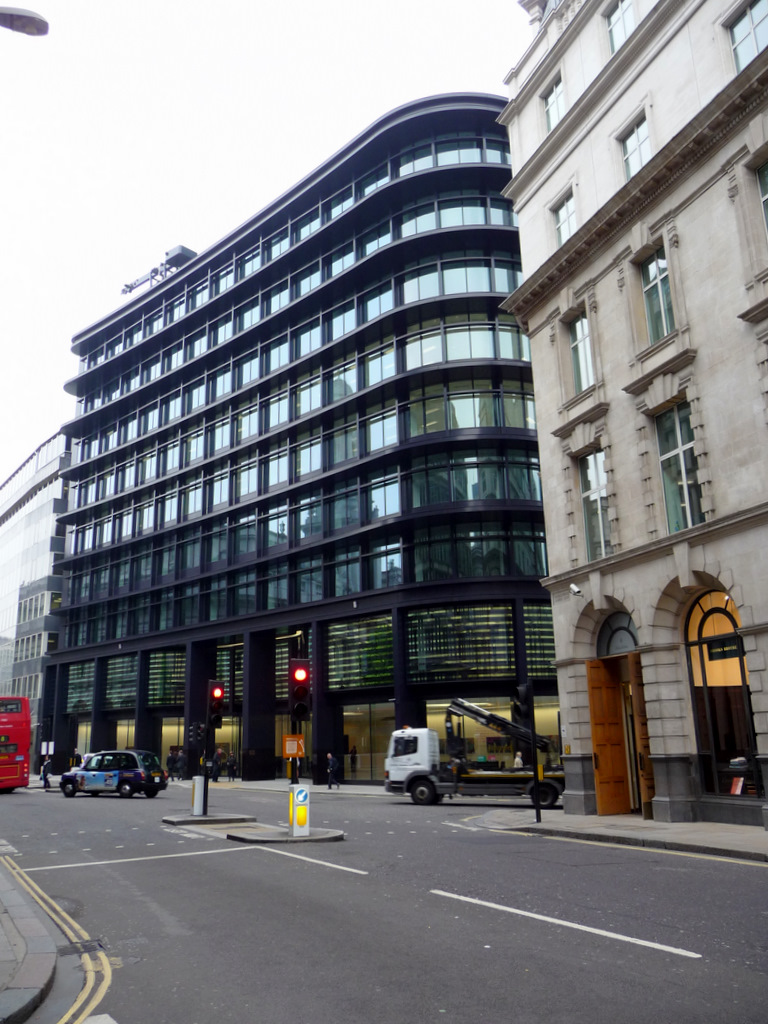
Berenberg's London office in 60 Threadneedle Street in the City of London

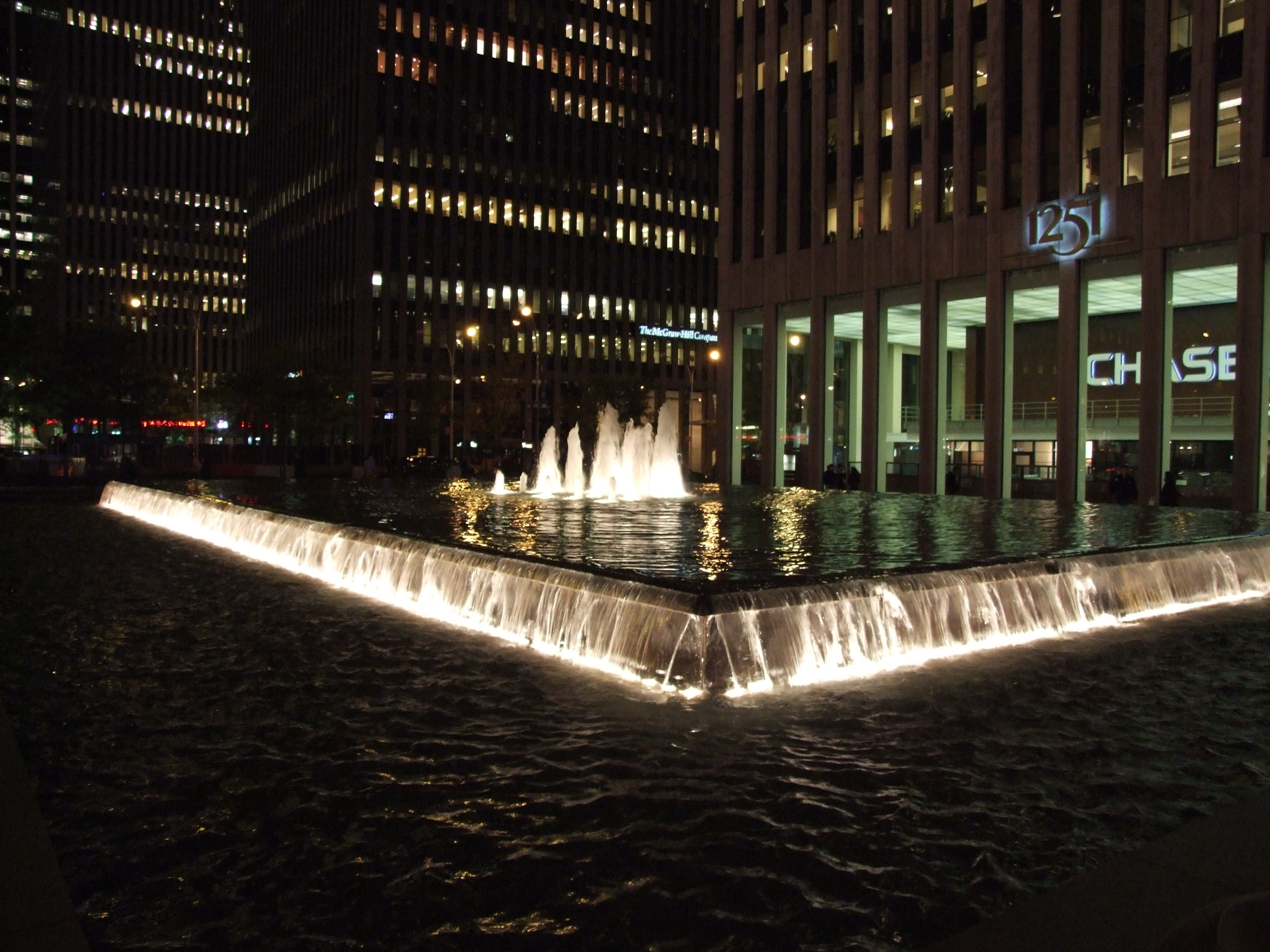
1251 Avenue of the Americas in Manhattan

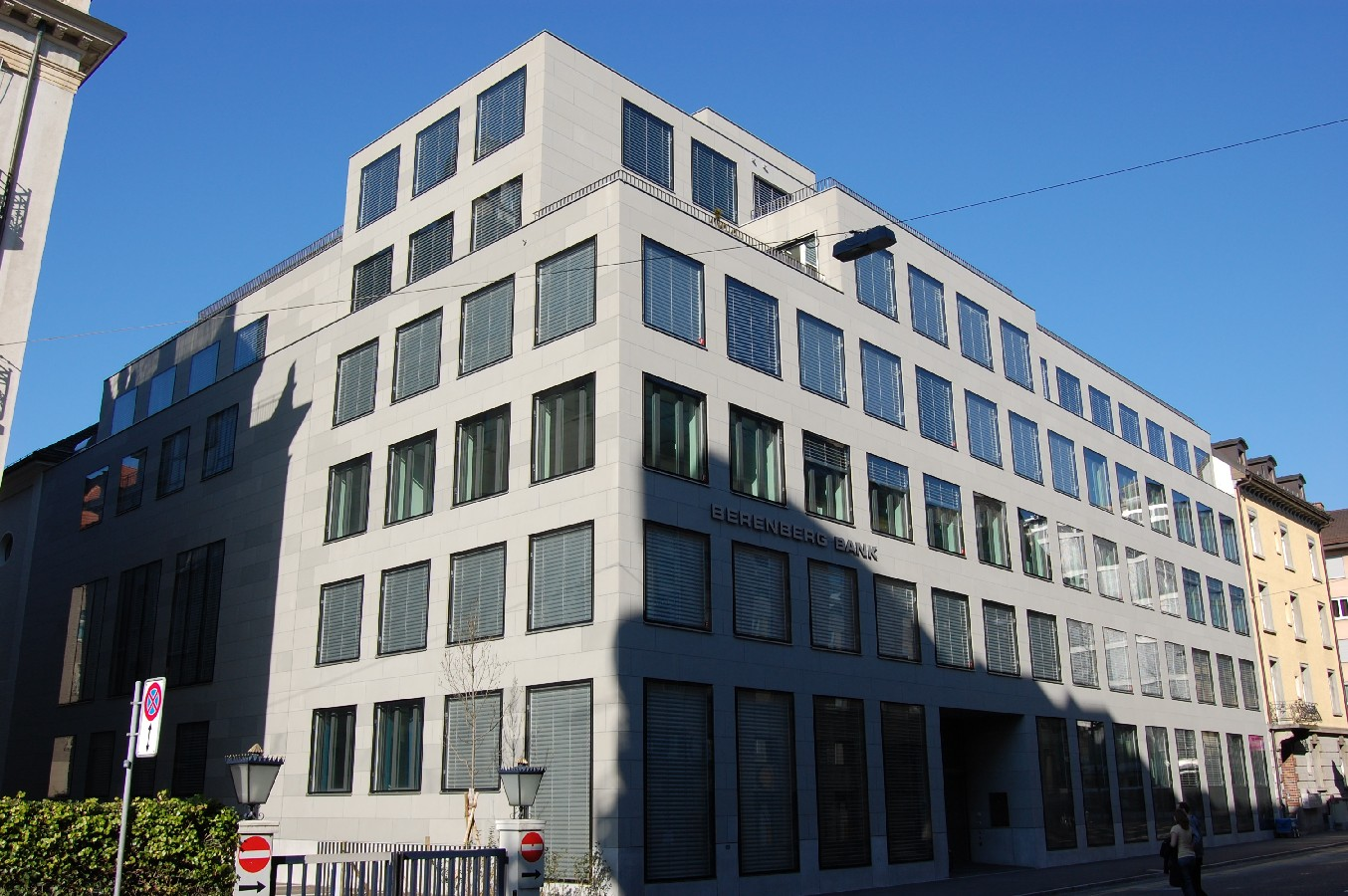
The Zürich office of Bergos AG, the former Berenberg Bank (Schweiz) AG

== Philanthropy and donations ==
The Berenberg Bank Stiftung is a philanthropic foundation founded in 1990 on the occasion of the 400th anniversary of the establishment of Berenberg Bank. The chairman of the board is Hans-Walter Peters. The foundation awards several prizes, including the Berenberg Culture Prize to younger artists and the Berenberg Scholarships to individual artists and groups. From 2009, the Universitäts-Gesellschaft Hamburg has awarded the Berenberg Prize for Scientific Language, that promotes German as a scientific language.

Berenberg Bank is the largest Hamburg donor to the CDU.

== Ownership ==
Berenberg Bank is currently run by three personally liable partners, Hendrik Riehmer, David Mortlock and Christian Kühn.

=== Partners ===
Berenberg family

No	Picture	Name and lifespan	Period	Head of the company	Notes
1		Hans Berenberg (1561–1626)	1590‒1626		
2		Paul Berenberg (1566–1645)	1590‒1645		
3		Hans Berenberg (1593–1640)	1626‒1640		
4		Johann Berenberg (1622–1699)	1645–1699		
5		Rudolf Berenberg (1623–1672)	1645–1672		
6		Cornelius Berenberg (1634–1711)	1660–1711		
7		Johann Berenberg (1674–1749)	1715–1749		
8		Senator Rudolf Berenberg (1680–1746)	1715–1746		
9		Rudolf Berenberg (1712–1761)	1739–1761		
10		Senator Paul Berenberg (1716–1768)	1749‒1768		
11		Johann Berenberg (1718–1772)	1749‒1772		
12		Johann Hinrich Gossler (1738–1790)	1769‒1790	1772–1790	Husband of Elisabeth Berenberg; son-in-law of Johann Berenberg
14		Ludwig Erdwin Seyler (1758–1835)	1788–1836	1790–1836	Husband of Anna Henriette Gossler; son-in-law of Johann Hinrich Gossler and Elisabeth Berenberg. Johann Hinrich Gossler named him a partner when he married his daughter, in the same way he himself had become a partner. Seyler succeeded his father-in-law as head of the company in 1790. For many years Seyler owned 5/12 (about 41%) of the company and was the company's senior partner and largest owner. After his death, his children briefly were co-owners of the Berenberg company from 26 October to 31 December 1836
15		Elisabeth Gossler née Berenberg (1749–1822)	1790‒1800		Daughter of Johann Berenberg; the last member of the Berenberg family in the male line; wife of Johann Hinrich Gossler
16		Senator Johann Heinrich Gossler (1775–1842)	1798 ‒1842	1836–1842	Son of Johann Hinrich Gossler and Elisabeth Berenberg
17		Johann Heinrich Gossler (1805–1879)	1830‒1879		Son of Johann Heinrich Gossler; grandson of Johann Hinrich Gossler and Elisabeth Berenberg
18		Elisabeth von Hosstrup (1789–1837)	1836		Daughter of L.E. Seyler and Anna Henriette Gossler; granddaughter of Johann Hinrich Gossler and Elisabeth Berenberg; wife of Gerhard von Hosstrup
19		Johann Hinrich Seyler	1836		Son of L.E. Seyler and Anna Henriette Gossler; grandson of Johann Hinrich Gossler and Elisabeth Berenberg
20		Emilie Homann	1836		Daughter of L.E. Seyler and Anna Henriette Gossler; granddaughter of Johann Hinrich Gossler and Elisabeth Berenberg
21		Louise Auguste Seyler	1836		Daughter of L.E. Seyler and Anna Henriette Gossler; granddaughter of Johann Hinrich Gossler and Elisabeth Berenberg
22		Maria Seyler	1836		Daughter of L.E. Seyler and Anna Henriette Gossler; granddaughter of Johann Hinrich Gossler and Elisabeth Berenberg
23		Louise Pinckernelle	1836		Daughter of L.E. Seyler and Anna Henriette Gossler; granddaughter of Johann Hinrich Gossler and Elisabeth Berenberg
24		Henriette Wegner (1805–1875)	1836		Daughter of L.E. Seyler and Anna Henriette Gossler; granddaughter of Johann Hinrich Gossler and Elisabeth Berenberg; wife of Norwegian industrialist Benjamin Wegner
25		Wilhelm Gossler (1811–1895)	1837–1858		Son of Johann Heinrich Gossler; grandson of Johann Hinrich Gossler and Elisabeth Berenberg
26		Baron John von Berenberg-Gossler (1839–1913)	1864–1913		Son of Johann Heinrich Gossler (1805–1879), great-grandson of Johann Hinrich Gossler and Elisabeth Berenberg
27		Ernst Gossler	1873–1893		
28		Senator John von Berenberg-Gossler (1866–1943)	1892–1908		
29		Baron Cornelius von Berenberg-Gossler (1874–1953)	1898–1953		
30		Andreas von Berenberg-Gossler (1880–1938)	1908–1923		
33		Baron Heinrich von Berenberg-Gossler (1907–1997)	1935–1979		

Non-family partners

No	Picture	Name	Period	Head of the company	Notes
13		Franz Friedrich Kruckenberg (1746–1819)	1777‒1819		Joined Berenberg as an accountant and later became a partner. He was married to Johann Hinrich Gossler's younger sister Margaretha Katharina Gossler (1749–1795) and was thus the brother-in-law of Johann Hinrich Gossler and Elisabeth Berenberg, but not on the Berenberg side of the family. As of 1809 Kruckenberg owned 3/12 of the Berenberg company and was one of three partners alongside L.E. Seyler and Johann Heinrich Gossler
31		Heinrich Burchard	1920‒1930		
32		Walter Gleich	1923–1930		
34		August Rohdewald	1948–1961		
35		Heinz A. Lessing	1961–1979		
36		Karl-Theodor Lindemann	1964–1972		
37		Joachim H. Wetzel	1968–1998		
38		Baron Peter von Kap-Herr	1976–1999		
39		Joachim von Berenberg-Consbruch	1978‒2005		He was born Joachim Consbruch in 1940 and assumed the name von Berenberg-Consbruch in Hamburg in 1976 after his stepfather Cornelius von Berenberg-Gossler. He is not himself descended from the Berenberg family.
40		Claus-G. Budelmann	1988–2008		
41		Andreas Odefey	1998–2000		
42		Hans-Walter Peters	2000–2021	2009–2021	
43		Guido M. Sollors	2004–2008		
44		Andreas Brodtmann	2009–2015		
45		Hendrik Riehmer	Since 2009		
46		David Mortlock	Since 2021		
47		Christian Kühn	Since 2021		

== See also ==
- Berenberg family
- Gossler family
- Seyler family
- List of banks in Germany

== Literature ==
- Clarita Bernstorff, Hartwig Bernstorff, Emanuel Eckardt, Change is the only constant: Berenberg; a history of one of the world's oldest banks, Hanser Literaturverlage, 336 pages, ISBN 978-1-56990-601-9
- Maria Möring, Joh. Berenberg, Gossler & Co. Hamburg, Hamburg, Wirtschaftsgeschichtliche Forschungsstelle, 1961
- Joh. Berenberg, Gossler & Co.: Die Geschichte eines deutschen Privatbankhauses, Berenberg Bank, Hamburg 1990
