= Johann Hinrich Gossler =

German merchant and banker (1738–1790)

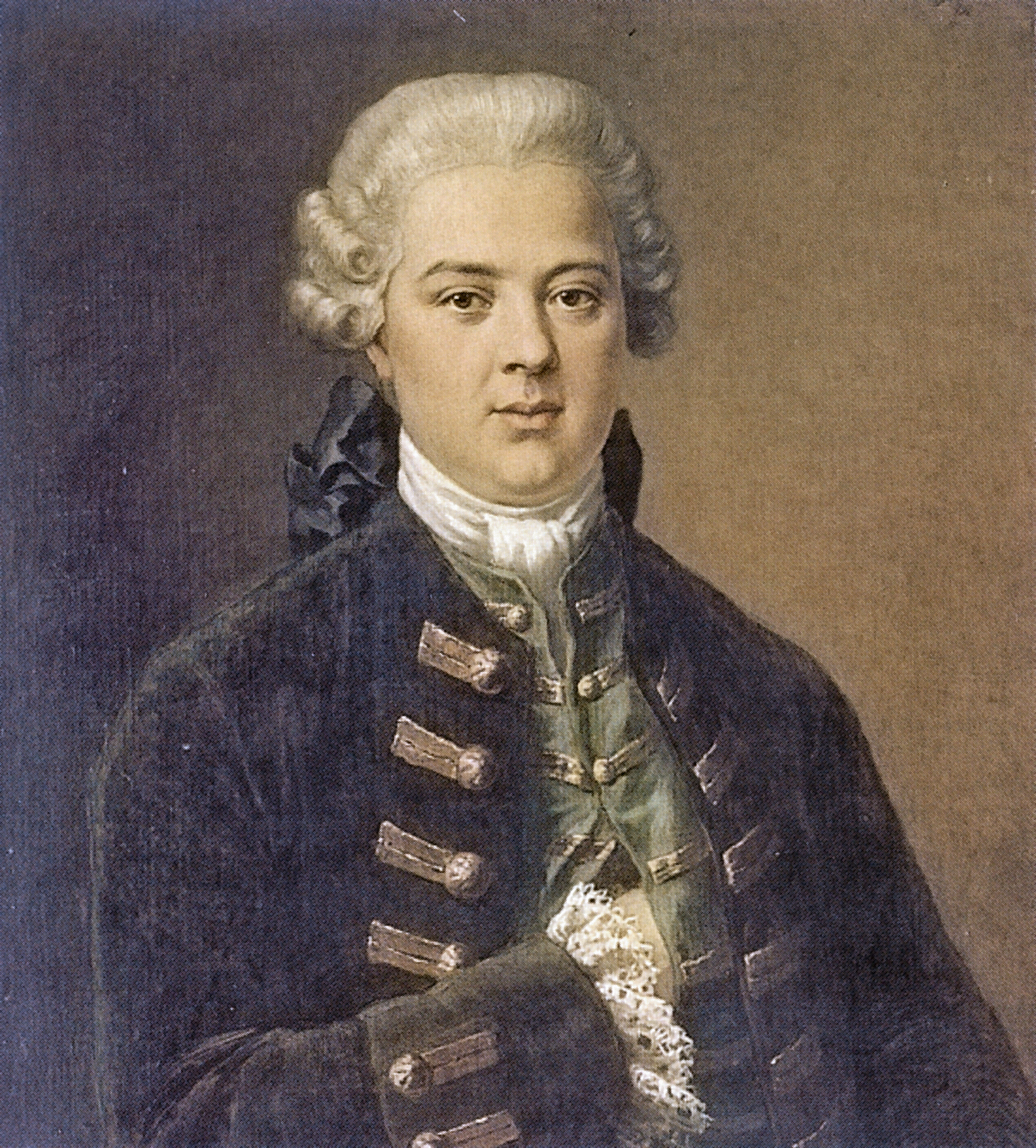
Johann Hinrich Gossler

Johann Hinrich Gossler (18 August 1738 – 31 August 1790) was a German merchant and banker. He was married to Elisabeth Berenberg (1749–1822) and succeeded his father-in-law Johann Berenberg as head of the Berenberg & Gossler company, that was renamed Joh. Berenberg, Gossler & Co. the year following his death. During Gossler's tenure as the company's main partner it became one of the largest merchant houses of Hamburg. Many of his descendants were prominent in Hamburg society, including his grandson, Hamburg's first mayor Hermann Gossler. Some of his descendants were later ennobled as the barons von Berenberg-Gossler. The Gossler Islands in Antarctica are named in honour of his family.

== Background ==
Johann Hinrich Gossler was a son of Johan Eibert Gossler (1700–1776), an accountant and burgher of Hamburg who had bought the office of Herrenschenk for 10,600 mark, making him master of ceremonies of the Hamburg council. The Gossler family had been burghers and velvet makers in Hamburg at least since the 17th century. The name Gossler appears in the city already in the 14th century, although it is unknown if it is the same family. Gossler's maternal grandfather Jürgen Friedrich Boedecker was a Hamburg merchant and grand burgher from 1706, and his great-grandfather Eibert Tiefbrunn was also a prominent Hamburg merchant. A list of his ancestors is included in the Hamburgisches Geschlechterbuch. Johann Hinrich Gossler attended the Johanneum zu Michaelis and started his career at 15 as an apprentice of the merchant Hinrich Mönkhusen. After Mönkhusen went bankrupt he became a Junge with the brothers Johann and Paul Berenberg.

== Berenberg & Gossler ==
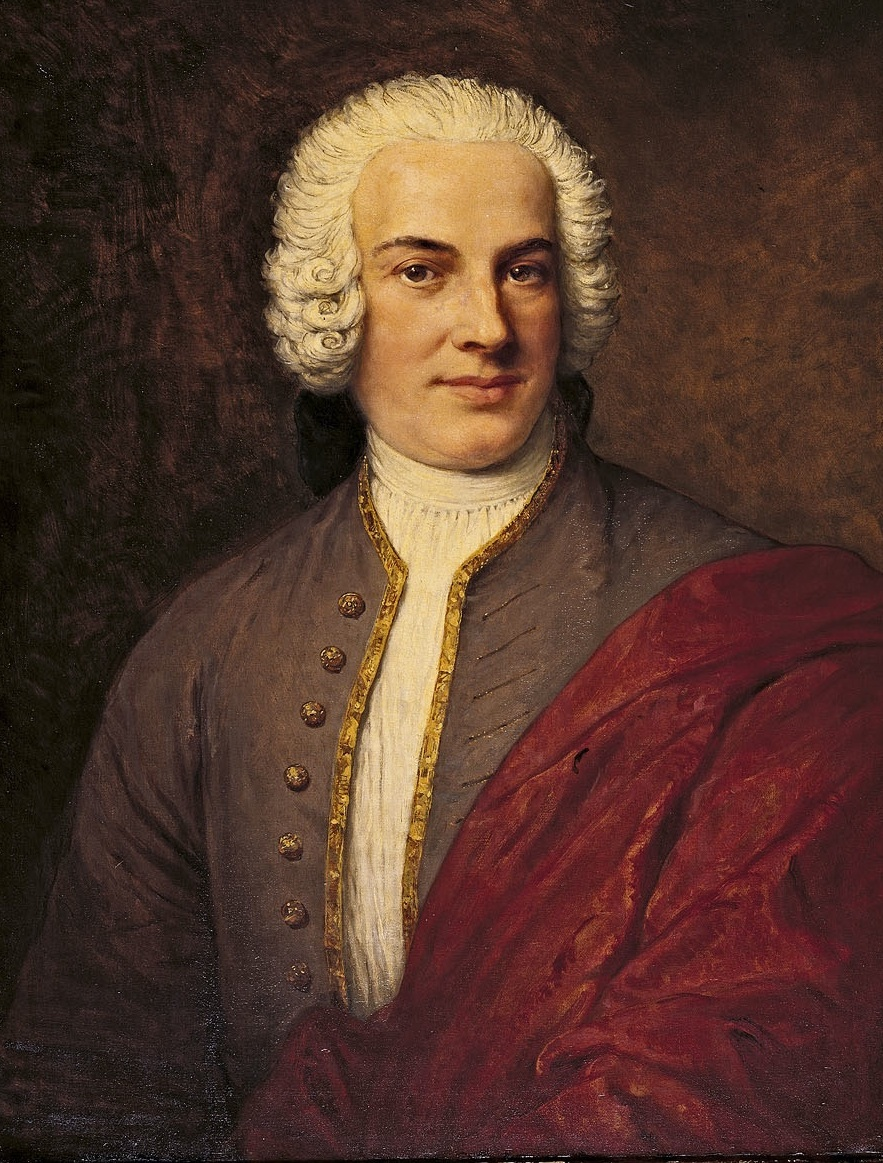
His father-in-law Johann Berenberg (1718–1772)

When he joined the company of the brothers Johann and Paul Berenberg, the brothers imported luxury goods from overseas for sale on the northern European market, notably sugar, and were involved in insurance, merchant banking and shipping ventures. At the time the office and warehouse of the Berenberg brothers was located in a building they had inherited from their father in Gröningerstraße.

After seven years, at 22 and having completed his apprenticeship, Gossler left Hamburg to work for a company in Cádiz, and travelled extensively in Spain, Portugal, France and England.

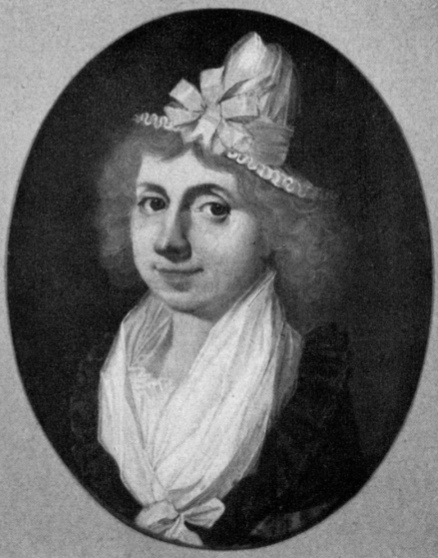
His wife Elisabeth Berenberg (1749–1822)

In 1768, he returned to Hamburg, where he married Elisabeth Berenberg (1749–1822) in the same year. She was the only daughter of the Berenberg company's surviving owner, Johann Berenberg (1718–1772) and his only surviving child and sole heir after the death of her brother; Paul Berenberg had no children. After the wedding Johann Berenberg made his son-in-law a partner in 1769. Upon the death of Johann Berenberg in 1772, Johann Hinrich Gossler became the company's sole owner. In 1777 he named his brother in law Franz Friedrich Kruckenberg (1746–1819) as a partner. In 1788, Gossler took on his own son-in-law Ludwig Erdwin Seyler—married to his eldest daughter Anna Henriette Gossler—as a partner. Seyler was a son of Abel Seyler, an infamous former banker whose unethical business practices had made him highly controversial in Hamburg in the 1760s, but who later became one of the leading theatre principals of 18th century Germany. L.E. Seyler was born in Hamburg, but grew up with his uncle J.G.R. Andreae in Hanover, and joined Gossler as an apprentice at the age of 17 in 1775.

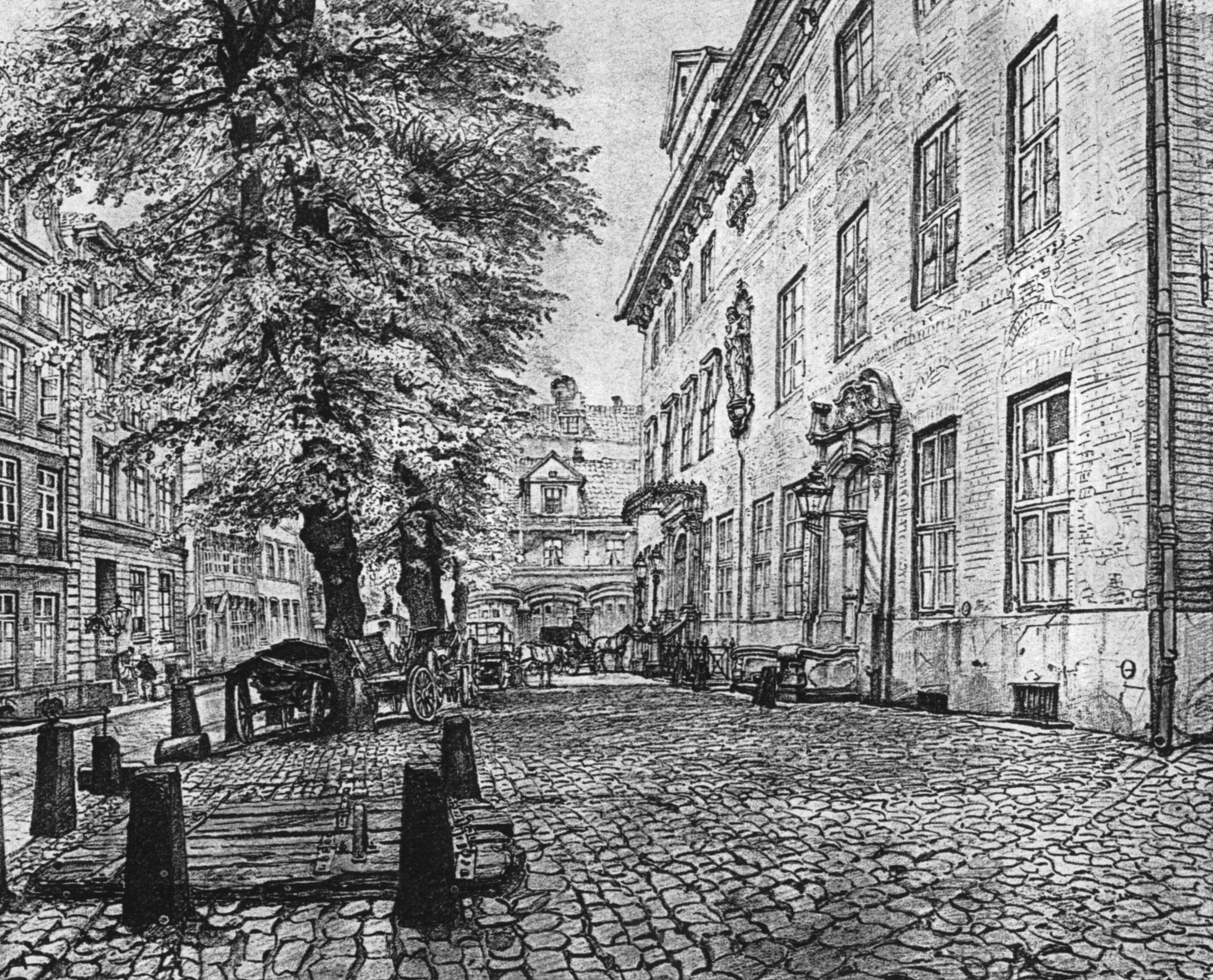
The Mortzenhaus to the right. It was both the Gossler family's city residence and the company's headquarters.

During Gossler's tenure he expanded the company's international trade with the Americas significantly. Denmark, Spain and France had liberalized trade with their colonies in the 1760s, while the United States had been independent since the conclusion of the American Revolutionary War in 1783. The company was also involved in commodities trade from England to Russia and the Levant, extensive shipping ventures, whaling ventures in Greenland and insurance activities. By 1785 Gossler and his wife held an equity stake of nearly half a million Mark Banco in the company, twice as much as the brothers Johann and Paul Berenberg combined 17 years earlier. In the 1790s the company again doubled in size, reaching an equity capital of about a million Mark Banco by the end of the century. Under the leadership of his son-in-law and his son, the company became one of the largest sugar importers on the North European market. Astrid Petersson notes that the company's "extensive sugar imports in the period after 1814, especially from Brazil, the U.S. and East Asia, some of which represented a continuation of their trading relationships dating back to the late 18th century, contributed significantly to the company's wealth."

As was usual even for the largest merchant houses at the time, the company employed a relatively small number of people at the head office (Kontor), two to three accountants and four to six servants assisting the partners, that is, at various times, Johann Hinrich Gossler, his father-in-law, his brother-in-law and his son-in-law. The work at the head office mainly consisted of business correspondence, accounting and decisions about contracts. Gossler acquired Mortzenhaus, one Hamburg's largest city palaces, which was both the Gossler family's city residence (they spent the summers on a property outside the city) and the company's headquarters.

Johann Hinrich Gossler was the father of Hamburg senator and banker Johann Heinrich Gossler II (1772–1842) and the grandfather of Hamburg senator and First Mayor Hermann Gossler (1802–1877) and banker Johann Heinrich Gossler III (1805–1879). Johann Heinrich Gossler III was the father of Johann Berenberg Gossler (1839–1913). In 1880, the Hamburg Senate granted Johann Berenberg Gossler the name of Berenberg-Gossler, and in 1888, the family was ennobled in the Kingdom of Prussia as von Berenberg-Gossler. In 1910, Johann von Berenberg-Gossler was raised to the Baronial rank. Baron Johann von Berenberg-Gossler was the father of John von Berenberg-Gossler (1866–1943), Senator and German Ambassador in Rome. Johann Hinrich Gossler and Elisabeth Berenberg were also the grandparents of Betty Seyler (1789–1837), married to businessman Gerhard von Hosstrup, Louise Seyler (1799–1849), married to ship broker Ernst Friedrich Pinckernelle, and Henriette Seyler (1805–1875), married to Norwegian industrialist Benjamin Wegner.

== Ancestry ==
Ancestors of Johann Hinrich Gossler

Claus GOSSLER (1630–1713), velvet maker, Hamburg burgher (from 1656)
Jacob GOSSLER (1666–1732), velvet maker, Hamburg burgher
Johan Eibert GOSSLER (1700–1776), Herrenschenk of Hamburg, burgher
Dettloff VOIGT (1634–1696)
Anna Margaretha VOIGT (1671–1715)
Maria uxor Dettlof (1633–1674)
Johann Hinrich Gossler
Jürgen Friedrich BOEDECKER (1685–1729), merchant, Hamburg grand burgher
Catharina Lucretia BOEDECKER (1694–1773)
Eibert TIEFBRUNN (1644–1712), Hamburg Oberalter
Anna Magdalene TIEFBRUNN (1687–1732)
Elisabeth RASCH (1650–1703)

== Literature ==
- Kopitzsch, Franklin; Brietzke, Dirk, eds. (2001). "Johann Hinrich Gossler". Hamburgische Biografie: Personenlexikon. Wallstein Verlag. pp. 153–154.
- Percy Ernst Schramm, Kaufleute zu Haus und über See. Hamburgische Zeugnisse des 17., 18. und 19. Jahrhunderts, Hamburg, Hoffmann und Campe, 1949
- Percy Ernst Schramm, Neun Generationen: Dreihundert Jahre deutscher Kulturgeschichte im Lichte der Schicksale einer Hamburger Bürgerfamilie (1648–1948), Vol. 1, Göttingen, 1963.
- Schramm, Percy Ernst (April 1959). "Kaufleute Während Besatzung, Krieg und Belagerung (1806–1815). Der Hamburger Handel in der Franzosenzeit, Dargestellt an Hand von Firmen- und Familienpapieren". Tradition: Zeitschrift für Firmengeschichte und Unternehmerbiographie. 4 (2): 88–114. doi:10.1515/zug-1959-0205. JSTOR 40696638. S2CID 186954441.
- Schramm, Percy Ernst (1 October 1957). "Hamburger Kaufleute in der 2. Hälfte des 18. Jahrhunderts". Tradition: Zeitschrift für Firmengeschichte und Unternehmerbiographie. 2 (4): 307–332. doi:10.1515/zug-1957-0403. JSTOR 40696554. S2CID 188457725.

| Preceded by Johann Berenberg (his father-in-law) | Head of Berenberg & Gossler; 1772–1790 | Succeeded by Ludwig Erdwin Seyler (his son-in-law) |
