= Hans-Walter Peters =

German banker (born 1955)

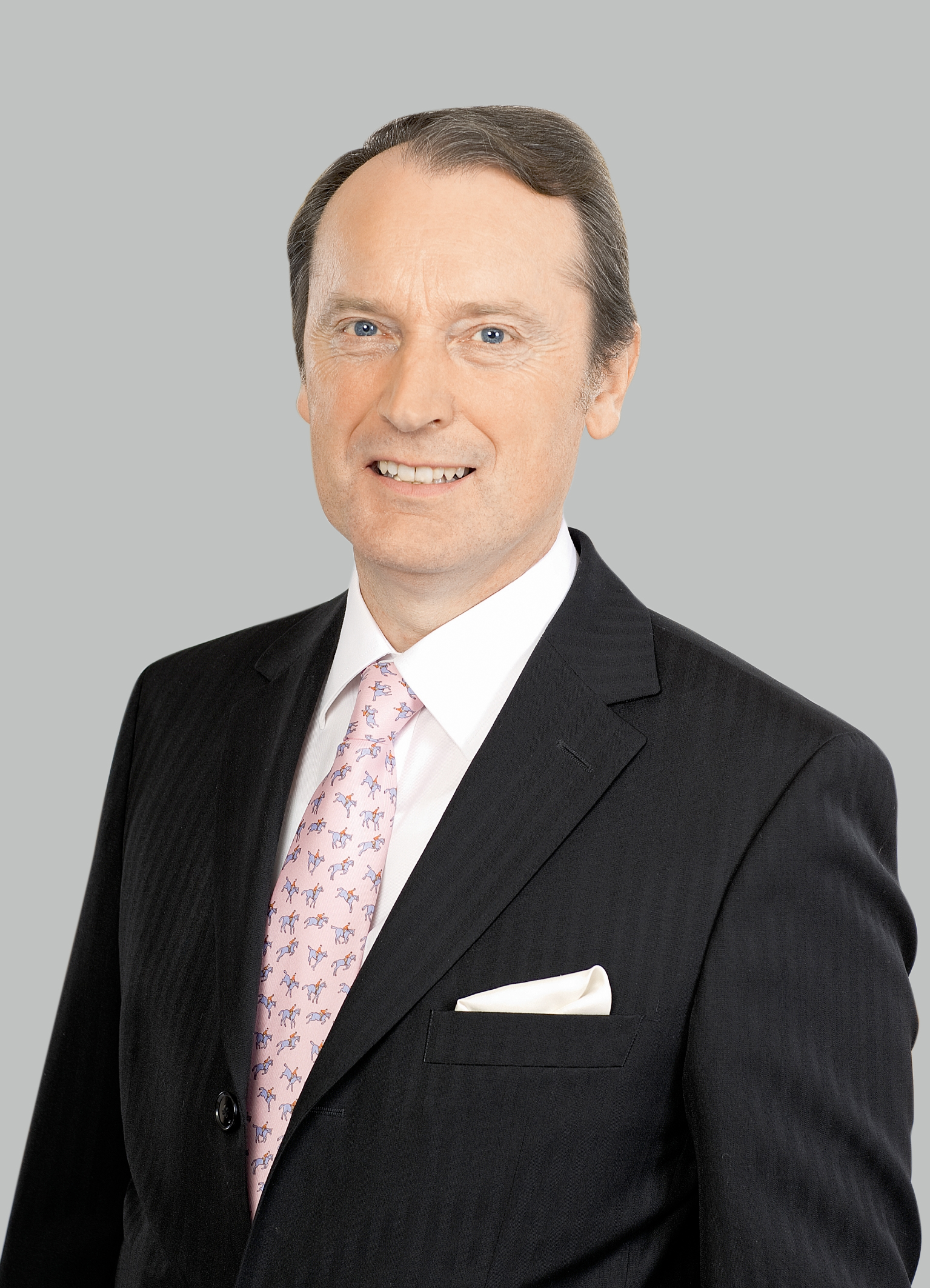
- Peters in 2016
- Born: 3 April 1955 (age 71); Soltau, West Germany
- Occupation: Banker

Hans-Walter Peters (born 3 April 1955) is a German banker. He is the current spokesman of the personally liable partners (i.e. head) of Berenberg Bank and the president of the Association of German Banks, the main lobby group for Germany's financial sector.

== Career ==
Peters earned a doctorate in economics at the University of Kiel in 1986, and started his career as a bond portfolio analyst with Dresdner Bank in 1987. He was head of portfolio strategy at DZ Bank 1989–1990 and head of the securities division at Frankfurter Volksbank 1990–1994.

Peters joined Berenberg Bank in 1994, and was named as a personally liable partner at the bank in 2000. As head of Berenberg Bank, he has significantly expanded the bank's activities in London. In 2010, Peters and his co-chairman Hendrik Riehmer borrowed €72 million to buy a 21 per cent stake in Berenberg previously held by public lender NordLB. In June 2026, he was appointed, together with Michael Horf, as a special commissioner to lead Berenberg after BaFin had removed the previous management board.

== Other activities ==
- KfW, Member of the Board of Supervisory Directors (since 2018)
- Übersee Club, Member of the Board of Trustees
- WHU – Otto Beisheim School of Management, Member of the Board of Trustees

== Extgernal links ==
- Media related to Hans-Walter Peters at Wikimedia Commons
