= Peter von Kap-Herr =

Baron Peter von Kap-herr (22 August 1934 in Gleiwitz – 11 February 2008) was a German banker, who served as a personally liable partner of Berenberg Bank from 1976 to 1999, the 31st person to be named a partner since the bank was founded in 1590.

He was married to Eleonore, Princess of Hohenlohe-Jagstberg (born 1940), a member of a mediatised royal family. They have two sons.
