= Johann Berenberg =

German merchant and banker

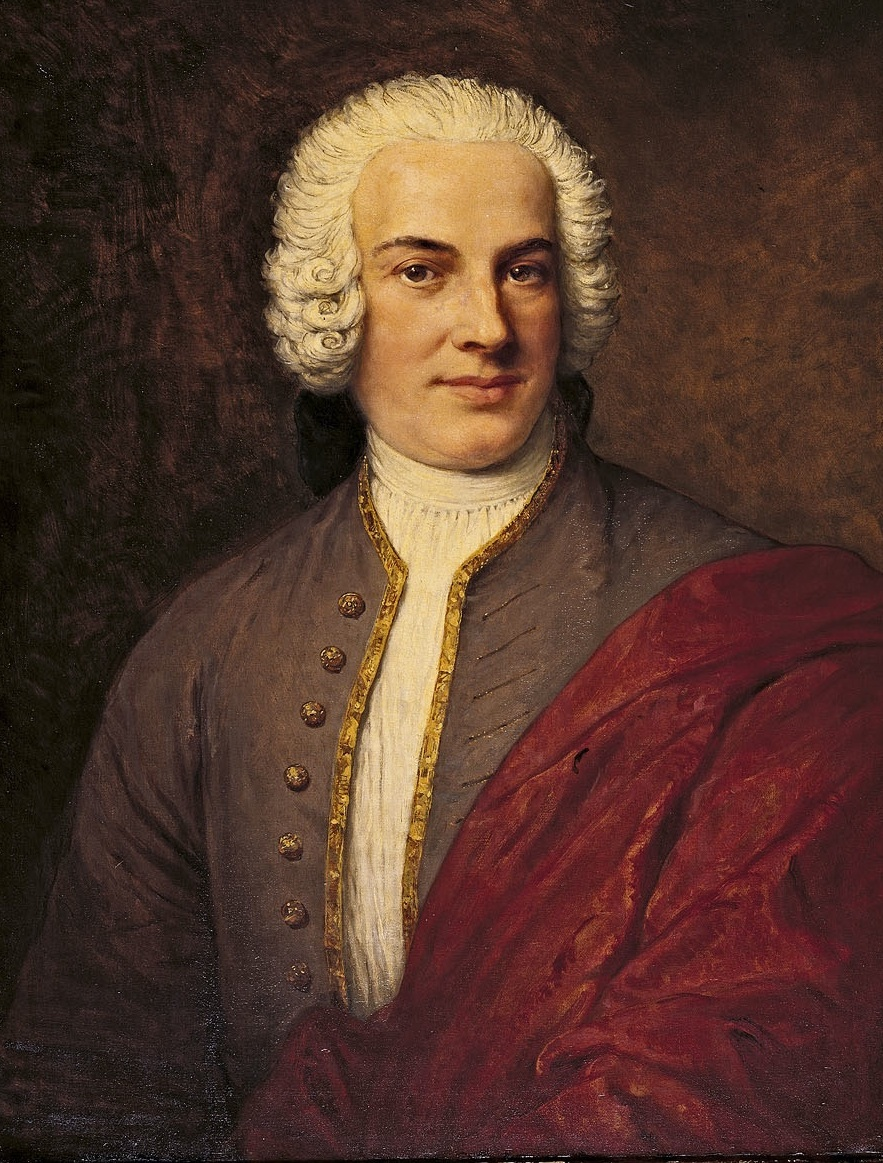
- Born: 18 March 1718; Hamburg
- Died: 2 March 1772 (aged 53); Hamburg
- Known for: Merchant banker; owner of Berenberg Bank
- Spouse: Anna Maria Lastrop

Johann Berenberg (12 March 1718 – 2 March 1772) was a German merchant and banker. He was a co-owner of Berenberg Bank from 1748, with his brother, senator Paul Berenberg, and after the latter's death in 1768 the sole owner. The bank still bears his name (Joh. Berenberg, Gossler & Co.). He was also noted as an art collector and held several public offices in the city-state of Hamburg.

He was a son of the Hamburg merchant banker and senator Rudolf Berenberg (1680–1746) and Anna Elisabeth Amsinck (1690–1748), and a grandson of Cornelius Berenberg and of the Lisbon and Hamburg merchant Paul Amsinck. He was also a great-grandson of the scholar Rudolf Capell, and was descended from the Welser family. Both his parents' families were from today's Belgium and the Netherlands, and his family retained its Dutch identity throughout his lifetime. An extensive list of his ancestors is included in the Hamburgisches Geschlechterbuch. The Berenberg company had been founded by his 2nd great-grandfather Hans Berenberg and the latter's brother Paul in 1590; both were married to daughters of the prominent Antwerp merchant Andries Snellinck and Françoise de Rénialme.

At the age of 17 he was sent to Venice, where he learnt his trade as an apprentice in a Venice firm between 1735 and 1741; his father had started his career as an apprentice in the same firm. In 1748 he became owner of the Berenberg company together with his brother Paul. He also held numerous honorary offices in Hamburg.

He was married to Anna Maria Lastrop (1723–1761), who belonged to a wealthy merchant family from Hamburg and Bremen, and they had two children. His only son Rudolf Berenberg was possibly mentally ill and died in the Dutch colony of Suriname in 1768, aged 20; he had apparently been sent to manage his family's business interests there. In the same year, senator Paul Berenberg died without an heir, making Johann Berenberg's daughter Elisabeth the last surviving member of the Berenberg family. In 1768, she married an employee of the Berenberg company, Johann Hinrich Gossler, and in 1769, Johann Berenberg made his son-in-law a partner. Three years after Berenberg's death, Johann Hinrich Gossler succeeded him as the company's head and sole owner.

== Literature ==
- Percy Ernst Schramm, Neun Generationen: Dreihundert Jahre deutscher Kulturgeschichte im Lichte der Schicksale einer Hamburger Bürgerfamilie (1648–1948). Vol. I and II, Göttingen 1963/64.
- Percy Ernst Schramm, "Johann Berenberg", Neue Deutsche Biographie, 2, 1955, p. 68
- "Johann Berenberg", Hamburgische Biografie, vol. 1, p. 43

Preceded by Rudolf Berenberg (his father)	Head of Berenberg Bank; 1748–1772	Succeeded by Johann Hinrich Gossler (his son-in-law)
