= Johann Heinrich Gossler =

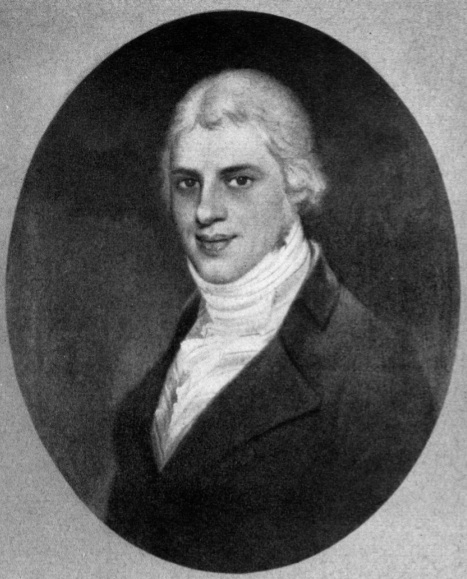
Johann Heinrich Gossler

Johann Heinrich Gossler (28 March 1775 – 3 April 1842) was a Hamburg banker and grand burgher, a member of the Berenberg-Gossler-Seyler banking dynasty, a co-owner (from 1798) of the Berenberg Bank and a senator of Hamburg from 1821. He was the son of Johann Hinrich Gossler and Elisabeth Berenberg (1749–1822), and the brother in law of Ludwig Erdwin Seyler. He was the father of Hamburg First Mayor Hermann Gossler and the grandfather of Baron Johann von Berenberg-Gossler (1839–1913). He was also the great-grandfather of First Mayor Johann Heinrich Burchard.
