= Cornelius Berenberg =

German banker

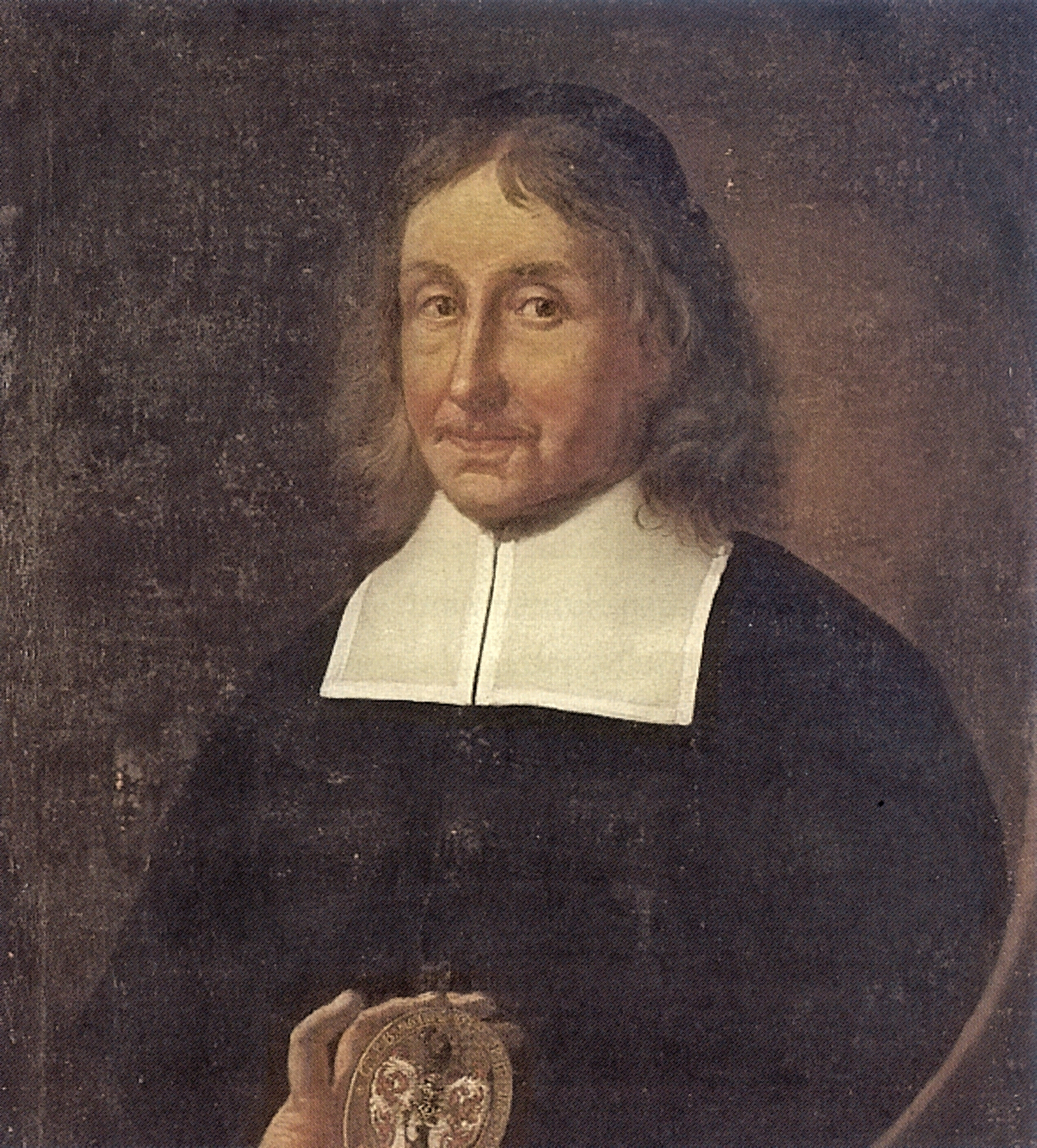
Cornelius Berenberg

Cornelius Berenberg (1634–1711) was a Hamburg grand burgher, merchant banker, a member of the Berenberg family, and owner of Berenberg Bank. His grandfather Hans Berenberg (1561–1626) had fled from Antwerp with his brother Paul Berenberg (1566–1645) and established the Berenberg merchant house in Hamburg. In Hamburg, the Berenberg family formed part of the Dutch merchant colony. Cornelius Berenberg was the first to engage in merchant banking. He developed the company into a very successful merchant house and merchant bank, and forged trade links with France, Spain, Portugal, Italy, Scandinavia and Russia. Family connections of the Berenbergs were instrumental to the development, especially in Livorno and Lisbon with its colonies of wealthy Dutch merchants.

His father was Hans Berenberg (1593–1640) and his mother was Adelheid Ruhlant (1611–1684), a daughter of the advocate Rütger Ruhlant (1568–1630) who had been ennobled by the Holy Roman Emperor in 1622, and Catarina de Greve (1582–1655).

He was married to Anna Margaretha Colin (1649–1684), daughter of Daniel Colin (1615–1660) and Elisabeth Adelheid Engels (1620–1659). His son was senator and banker Rudolf Berenberg.

== Literature ==
- Joh. Berenberg, Gossler & Co.: Die Geschichte eines deutschen Privatbankhauses, Berenberg Bank, Hamburg 1990
