= Emanuel Eckardt =

German journalist and caricaturist (born 1942)

Emanuel Eckardt (born 17 August 1942) is a German journalist, and caricaturist.

== Life ==
Eckardt was born in Hamburg in 1942, grew up there and studied graphics at the Kunstschule Alsterdamm and painting, illustration and book graphics at the Werkkunstschule Hamburg.

From 1965 to 1971, he worked as a freelance caricaturist for the Hamburger Abendblatt. From 1971, he worked as a reporter for Stern, which he left in 1984 to become deputy editor-in-chief at Merian, a position he held until 1988. After an intermezzo at GEO and the music magazine Amadeo (both as the editor-in-chief) and freelance work as reporter and author, he returned to Merian as editor-in-chief from 2001 to 2002.

Eckardt has worked and lived as a freelance author in Hamburg since 1991. His reports have been published in Brigitte, Cicero, Der Feinschmecker, Mare, Merian, SZ-Magazin, Spiegel-Special, Tempo and Die Zeit.

For his work Spiel ohne Grenzen in magazine Stern he was awarded the Egon-Erwin-Kisch-Preis in 1981.

== Work ==
- Hamburg. Eine Liebeserklärung. Ellert & Richter Verlag, Hamburg 2010, ISBN 978-3-8319-0391-7.
- Troja – ein göttliches Drama, with Felix Eckardt (illustrations). Baumhaus-Verlag, Frankfurt 2005, ISBN 3-833-93564-2.
- Halte Schritt – Kurt Ganske und seine Zeit. Hamburg, Hoffmann und Campe 2005, ISBN 3-455-09509-7.
- Herbert List. Ellert & Richter Verlag, Hamburg 2003, ISBN 3-8319-0131-7.
- Der Hausmeister – ein Schlüsselroman. Zürich, Haffmans Verlag 1990, ISBN 3-251-00164-7.
- Der Mops von Bornholm – die Wahrheit über Morten, den einzigen Mops, der ein grosser Sänger war; eine Bildergeschichte. Frankfurt, Insel 1985, ISBN 3-458-32566-2.
- Kein schöner Land zusammen mit Sebastian Knauer. Hamburg, Gruner und Jahr 1979, ISBN 3-570-00740-5.
