= Rudolf Berenberg =

German merchant and banker (1680-1746)

- Born: 1680
- Died: 1746 (aged 65–66)
- Occupation: Merchant
- Spouse: Anna Elisabeth Amsinck

Rudolf Berenberg (born 1680, died 1746) was a Hamburg merchant and banker and a member of the Berenberg banking family. He served as President of the Commerz-Deputation from 1728–1729 and as a Hamburg Senator from 1735. He was the son of Cornelius Berenberg (1634–1711), and was married to Anna Elisabeth Amsinck (1690–1748), a daughter of Paul Amsinck (1649–1706) and Christina Adelheid Capelle (1663–1730).

He was the father of

- Rudolf Berenberg (1712–1761), merchant in Hamburg
- Cornelius Berenberg (1714–1773), merchant in Livorno
- Paul Berenberg (1716–1768), Senator, co-owner of Berenberg Bank
- Johann Berenberg (1718–1772), co-owner and then sole owner of Berenberg Bank, married Anna Maria Lastrop (1723–1761)

== Literature ==
- Joh. Berenberg, Gossler & Co.: Die Geschichte eines deutschen Privatbankhauses, Berenberg Bank, Hamburg 1990
- Percy Ernst Schramm, Neun Generationen: Dreihundert Jahre deutscher Kulturgeschichte im Lichte der Schicksale einer Hamburger Bürgerfamilie (1648–1948). Vol. I and II, Göttingen 1963/64.
