= Paul Berenberg =

German banker (1716–1768)

- Born: 1716
- Died: 1768 (aged 51–52)
- Occupations: Merchant and banker
- Known for: Member of the Berenberg banking family

Paul Berenberg (born 1716, died 1768) was a Hamburg merchant and banker and a member of the Berenberg banking family. He served as a Senator of Hamburg, succeeding his father Rudolf Berenberg.

His brothers were Rudolf Berenberg (1712–1761), merchant in Hamburg, Cornelius Berenberg (1714–1773), merchant in Livorno, and Johann Berenberg (1718–1772), merchant in Hamburg.

== Literature ==
- Joh. Berenberg, Gossler & Co.: Die Geschichte eines deutschen Privatbankhauses, Berenberg Bank, Hamburg 1990
- Percy Ernst Schramm, Neun Generationen: Dreihundert Jahre deutscher Kulturgeschichte im Lichte der Schicksale einer Hamburger Bürgerfamilie (1648–1948). Vol. I and II, Göttingen 1963/64.
