= Grand Burgher =

Specific conferred or inherited title of medieval German origin

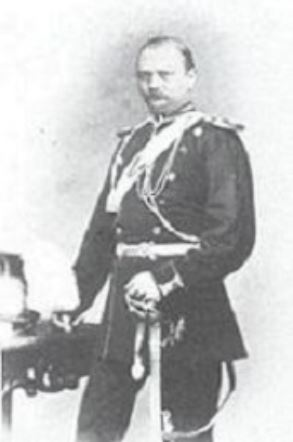
Photo: Grand Burgher Carl Jauch of Hamburg (German: Großbürger Carl Jauch zu Hamburg), 1828-1888, Lord of Wellingsbüttel and Cavalry Lieutenant in the Hamburg Citizen Militia, was a descendant of the distinguished Hanseaten Jauch family.

Grand Burgher [male] or Grand Burgheress [female] (from German: Großbürger [male], Großbürgerin [female]) is a specific conferred or inherited title of medieval German origin. It denotes a legally defined preeminent status granting exclusive constitutional privileges and legal rights (German: Großbürgerrecht). Grand Burghers were magnates, subordinate only to the monarch, and independent of feudalism and territorial nobility or lords paramount.

A member class within the patrician ruling elite, the Grand Burgher was a type of urban citizen and social order of highest rank. They existed as a formally defined upper social class, made up of affluent individuals and elite burgher families in medieval German-speaking city-states and towns under the Holy Roman Empire. They usually came from a wealthy business or significant mercantile background and estate. This hereditary title (and influential constitutional status) was privy to very few individuals and families across Central Europe. The title formally existed well into the late 19th century and early part of the 20th century.

In some instances, the Grand Burghers (Großbürger) or patricians (Patrizier) constituted the ruling class. This was true in autonomous German-speaking cities and towns of Central Europe that held a municipal charter and town privileges (German town law). Grand Burghers also existed as a ruling class in free imperial cities (such as Hamburg, Augsburg, Cologne, and Bern) that held imperial immediacy, or where nobility had no power of authority or supremacy.

== Hierarchy ==
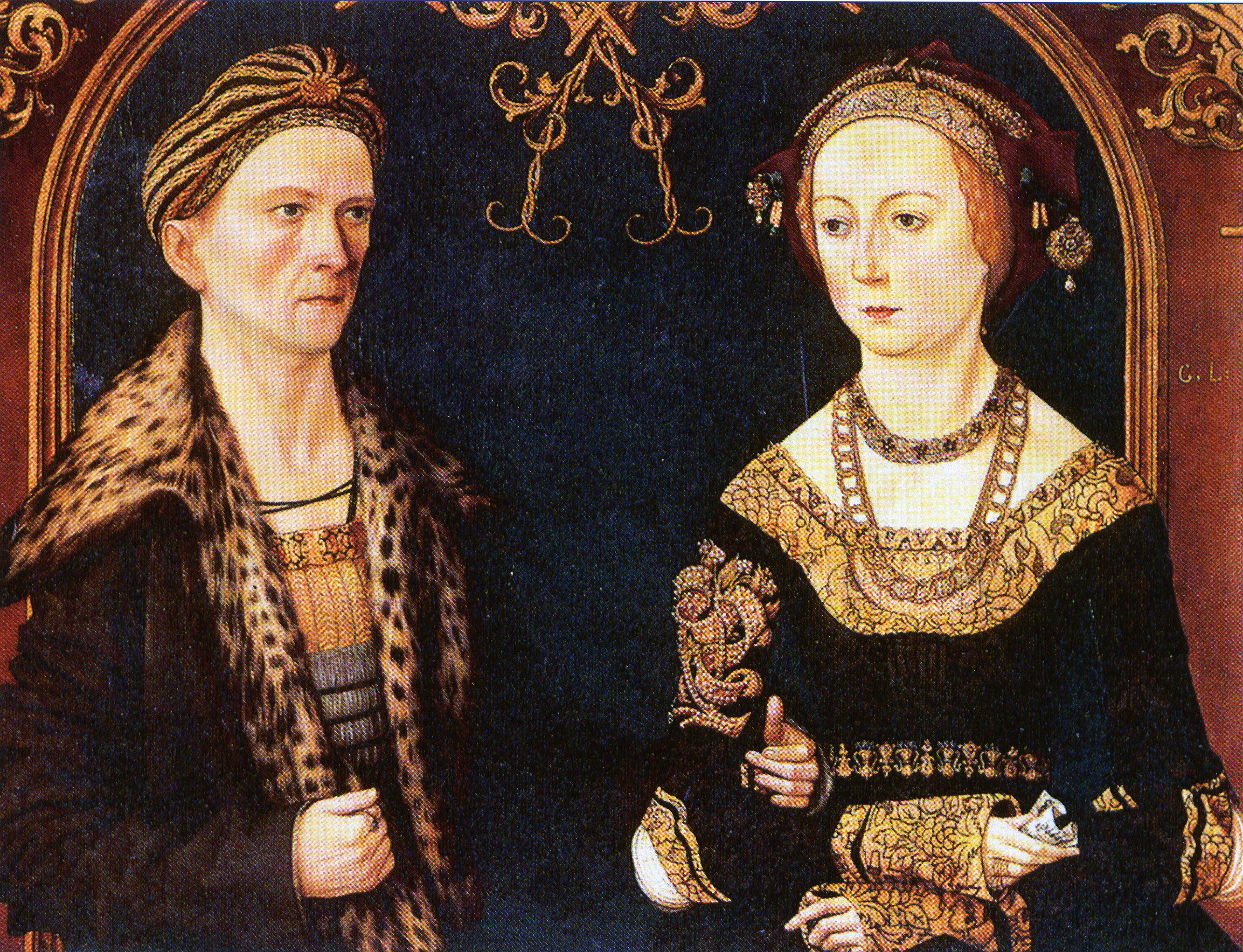
Portrait of Grand Burghers Jakob Fugger von der Lilie and his wife Sibylle Artzt (ca. 1500). Jakob Fugger von der Lilie (1459-1525), Großbürger zu Augsburg, was known as one of Europe's most significant merchants, mining entrepreneur, and banker. He elevated to Grand Burgher of Augsburg through his marriage to Sibylle Artzt, Großbürgerin zu Augsburg, the daughter of an eminent Augsburg Grand Burgher (Großbürger).

Since before the 15th century, the group of legally coequal "burghers" began to split into three different groups: hereditary grand-burghers, ordinary burghers (termed petty-burghers, German Kleinbürger or simply Bürger), and non-burghers. The petty-burghers were largely artisans, tradesmen, small business owners, merchants, shopkeepers, and others who were required by city or town constitutions to acquire the petty-burghership. Non-burghers, on the other hand, were merely "inhabitants" or resident aliens without specific legal rights in the territorial jurisdiction of a city or town. This group largely consisted of the working class, foreign or migrant workers, and other civil employees who were neither able nor eligible to acquire the petty-burghership.

Burghership generally granted a person the right to exist within the territorial jurisdiction of the city-state or town of burghership. It allowed them to be active members of its society, acquire real estate, pursue their specified economic activity or occupation, access social protection, and participate in municipal affairs. These rights included many exclusive constitutional privileges, exemptions, and immunities, especially those associated with the "grand" burghership (German: Großbürgerschaft).

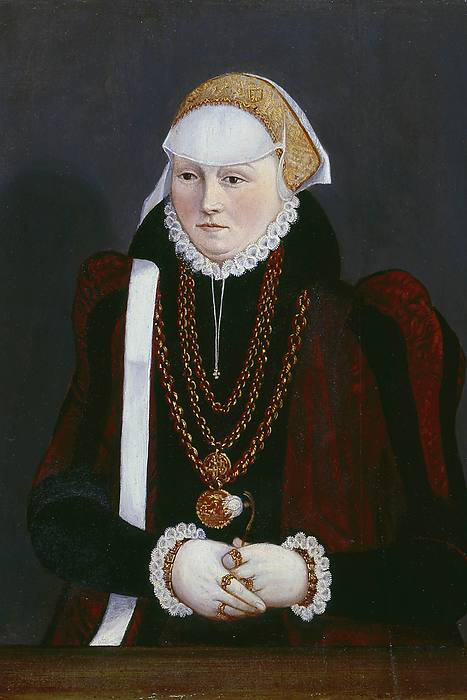
16th-century oil painting portrait of Grand Burgheress Katharina Völker of Frankfurt (German: Großbürgerin Katharina Völker zu Frankfurt) displayed at the Historical Museum Frankfurt. This painting, valued at more than 100,000 euros, was stolen from the museum in 2008 but was subsequently recovered by the German police.

Grand Burghers held rich historical and cultural roles that were created and expanded over the decades. They often united with other families of the same eminent status and branches of nobility. Grand Burghers were often of such extraordinary wealth and significant economic importance that they far exceeded the wealth and influence of even the highest-ranking members of the nobility. The latter often sought intermarriage with elite grand-burgher families to maintain their noble lifestyles. The names of these individuals and families were generally known in the city or town where they lived, and in many cases, their ancestors had contributed to regional history. The conferred grand-burghership was often hereditary in both male and female family descendants, and a hereditary title or rank stated as the person's occupation in records.

In Hamburg, for example, only the Grand Burghers were privileged with full, unrestricted freedom of large-scale trade, including foreign import and export trade. They were also allowed to entertain a bank account and be elected to the Senate of Hamburg, among other privileges.

== Confer of burghership ==
As with the administration expense for conferring letters patent to nobility, both types of burghership were also subject to expenses. In Hamburg, in the year 1600, the burghership expense was 50 Reichstaler for the grand burghership and 7 Reichstaler for the petty burghership. In 1833, the initial expense for receiving grand burghership in Hamburg was 758 Mark 8 Schilling (Hamburg Mark), while that of the petty burghership was 46 Mark 8 Schilling. Other ways to become a Grand Burgher included marrying a grand burgher or, subject to meeting constitutional conditions, the daughter of a grand burgher born in the city or town. These rules varied locally.

== German Revolution of 1918–19 ==
Following the German Revolution of 1918–19, the German "Großbürger," along with German nobility as a legally defined class, was abolished on August 11, 1919, with the promulgation of the Weimar Constitution. Under this constitution, all Germans were made equal before the law, and the legal rights and privileges of the Großbürger (Grand Burgher) and all ranks of nobility ceased. Any titles held prior to the Weimar Constitution were permitted to continue merely as part of the family name and heritage or were erased from future name use. Despite this, the Grand Burghers continued to retain their powerful economic significance, political authority, and influence, as well as their personal status and importance in society, beyond the Weimar Constitution.

== Other states, other developments ==
It seems that this medieval German concept was adopted by other countries and cities. In Hamburg, hereditary grand and ordinary petty burghership existed before 1600, and similarly in France. In 1657, the Dutch council of New Netherland established criteria for the rights of burghers in New Amsterdam (present-day New York City), distinguishing between "great" and "petty" burgher rights, following the distinction made in Amsterdam in 1652. In New Amsterdam during the mid-1600s, the ordinary petty-burghership was conferred at the administration expense of 20 Dutch florins, while the hereditary great-burghership 50 florins. In 1664, the concept was assumed by Beverwijck (present-day Albany).

== See also ==
- Patrician (ancient Rome)
- Patrician (post-Roman Europe)
- Aristocracy (class)
- Gentry
- Hanseaten (class)
- Burgess (title)
- Bourgeoisie
- Bildungsbürgertum
- Estates of the realm
- Franklin (class)
- Junker
- Hereditary title
- Nobility
- National Liberal Party (Germany)
