= Berenberg family =

Flemish-origined Hanseatic family

Berenberg/Gossler
- Coat of arms of the Barons of Berenberg-Gossler; the Berenberg bear (adopted in Flanders in the 16th century) and the Gossler goose foot (adopted in Hamburg in the 18th century)
- Current region: Germany
- Etymology: Bear mountain
- Origin: Gummersbach
- Connected families: Gossler, Amsinck
- Distinctions: Hereditary Grand Burghers of Hamburg from 1684; senators and First Mayor of Hamburg; ennobled in Prussia in 1888; Baronial rank in 1910

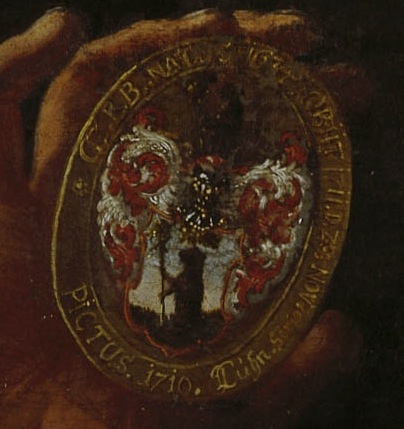
Coat of arms of the Berenberg family. Detail from a 1710 painting of Cornelius Berenberg (1634–1711).

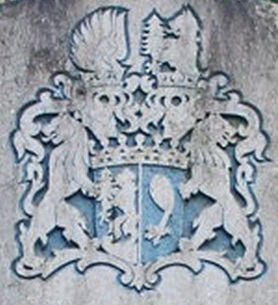
Berenberg-Gossler coat of arms on a grave at Niendorfer Cemetery, Hamburg

The Berenberg family (Dutch for "bear mountain") was a Flemish-origined Hanseatic family of merchants, bankers and senators in Hamburg, with branches in London, Livorno and other European cities. The family was descended from the brothers Hans and Paul Berenberg from Antwerp, who came as Protestant refugees to the city-republic of Hamburg following the Fall of Antwerp in 1585 and who established what is now Berenberg Bank in Hamburg in 1590. The Berenbergs were originally cloth merchants and became involved in merchant banking in the 17th century. Having existed continuously since 1590, Berenberg Bank is the world's oldest surviving merchant bank.

The Berenberg banking family became extinct in the male line with Elisabeth Berenberg (1749–1822); she was married to Johann Hinrich Gossler, who became a co-owner of the bank in 1769. From the late 18th century, the Gossler family, as owners of Berenberg Bank, rose to great prominence in Hamburg, and was widely considered one of Hamburg's two most prominent families, along with the related Amsinck family. A branch of the family was later ennobled by Prussia as Barons of Berenberg-Gossler (Hamburg was a free imperial city and had no nobility). Several members of the Berenberg and Gossler families served in the Senate of Hamburg from 1735, and Elisabeth Berenberg's grandson Hermann Gossler became head of state of the city-republic. Richard J. Evans describes the family as one of Hamburg's "great business families." The Gossler Islands in Antarctica are named for the family. Elisabeth Berenberg and Johann Hinrich Gossler presently have descendants with names including Berenberg-Gossler, Paus, Bernstorff and other names.

Members of the Berenberg family have founded several other companies. A London branch of the Berenberg family were prominent merchants in the West Indies trade from the 17th century and co-founded the London firm Meyer & Berenberg. Berenberg-Gossler & Partner was Hamburg's leading corporate law firm and later merged into the current law firm Taylor Wessing.

== History ==
=== The Berenbergs in Berg and Brabant ===
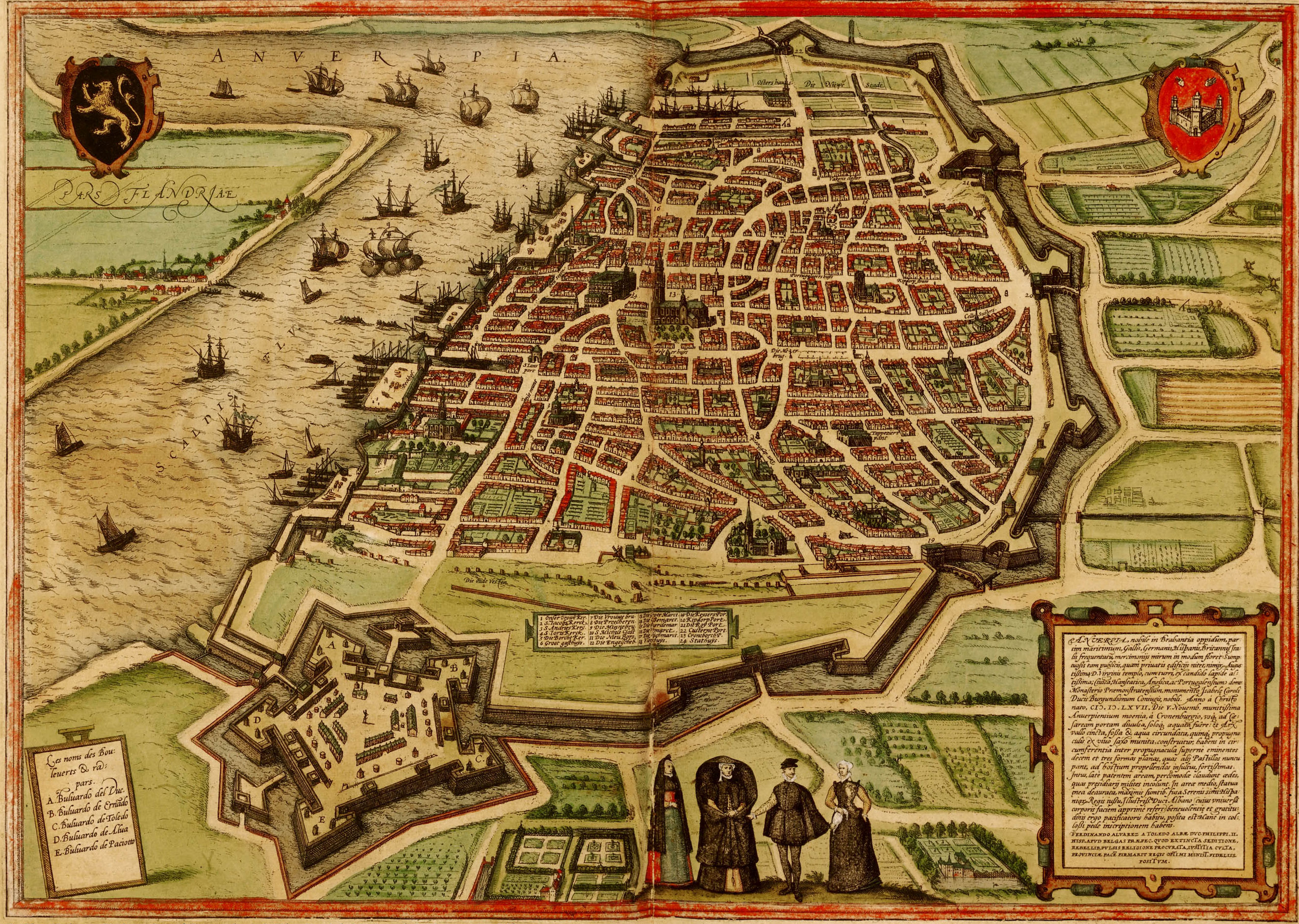
Antwerp in modern Belgium in 1572

The Berenberg family originates from the Bergisches Land region in the Duchy of Berg. Its earliest known ancestor, Thillmann Berenberg, was born on the Groß-Berenberg estate in 1465, and was a cloth merchant.

The growing linen industry of Brabant led Thillmann's son, Jan Berenberg (born 1490 in Gummersbach, died 1549 in Lier, Belgium), to take his family to Lier in Antwerp, where he became a burgher in 1515. He was married to Engele Segers, and they were the parents of Paul Berenberg (born ca. 1533 in Lier, died 1623 in Antwerp), who was a cloth merchant in Antwerp and who married Anna Kriekart from Everbroek. Paul Berenberg was the father of Hans (1561–1626) and Paul Berenberg (1566–1645). The two brothers married sisters Anna (1557–1635) and Francina Snellinck (1559–1642), daughters of the Antwerp merchant Andries Snellinck (1531–1606) and Françoise (Francina) de Rénialme (1539–1610).

The Berenbergs were one of 130 Dutch families that had become Lutheran during the Reformation. During the Eighty Years' War, the family fled Lier and settled in the nearby city of Antwerp (Stade). The family left Antwerp in 1585 as a result of the Fall of Antwerp, when the city was conquered by Alexander Farnese, Duke of Parma. The strongly fortified city, Europe's leading commercial centre at the time, was defended with resolute determination and courage by its citizens, but ultimately fell, and around 60% of the city's pre-siege population fled the city, fearing Spanish massacres or forced conversion to Roman Catholicism.

=== Grand burghers of Hamburg ===
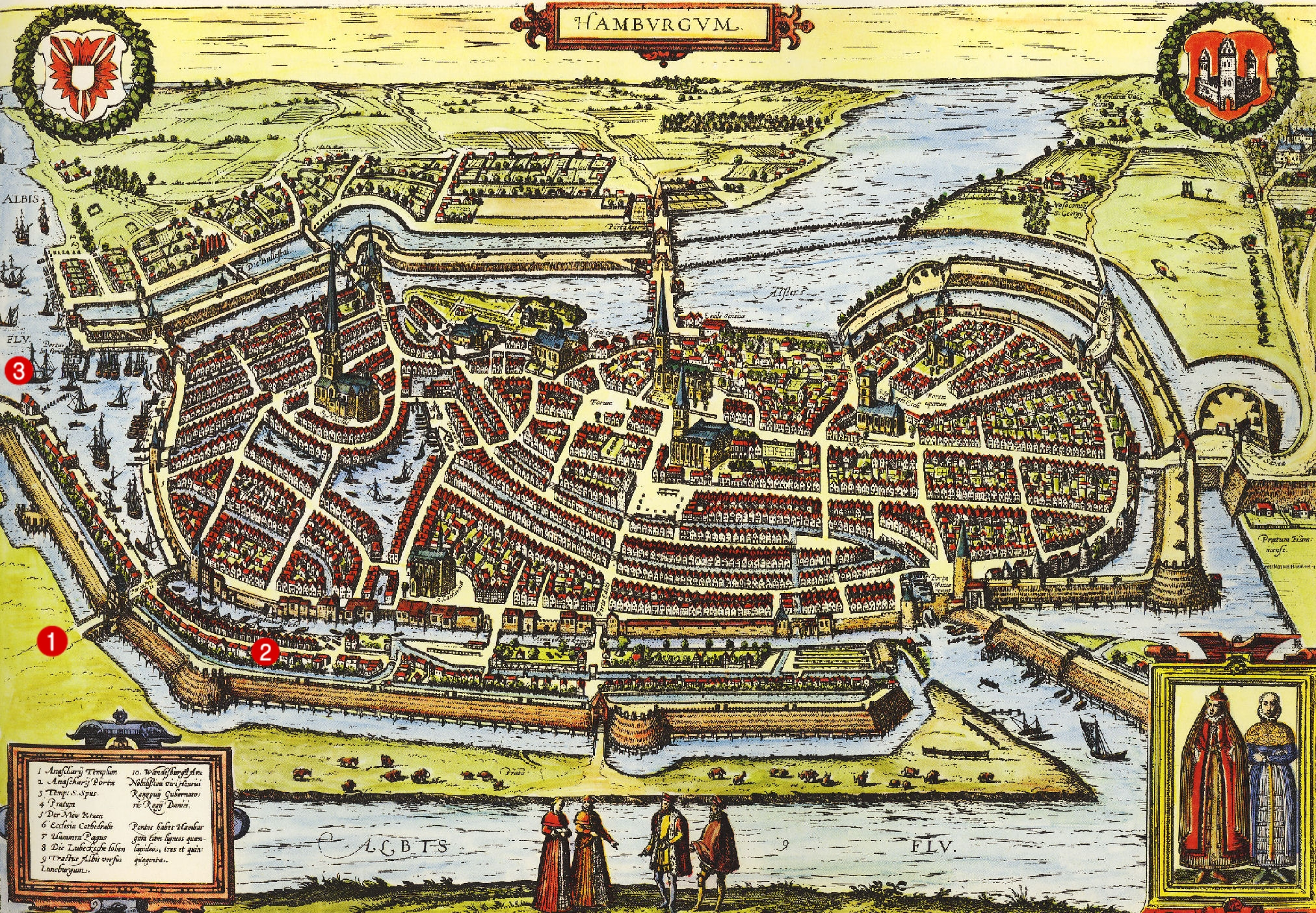
Hamburg ca. 1600

Many Dutch refugees settled in Hamburg, among them the brothers Hans and Paul Berenberg. In 1590, they founded the merchant house now known as Berenberg Bank. They were originally cloth merchants and active in the import-export business. In Hamburg, the Berenbergs initially formed part of a Dutch colony and intermarried with the city's leading Hanseatic families, several of which were also of Dutch descent (e.g. Amsinck). While a number of Dutch refugees became Hamburg citizens, Hans and Paul Berenberg were not prepared to take that step. In 1605, the Hamburg council issued a decree that gave the Dutch merchants the same rights as the burghers of Hamburg.

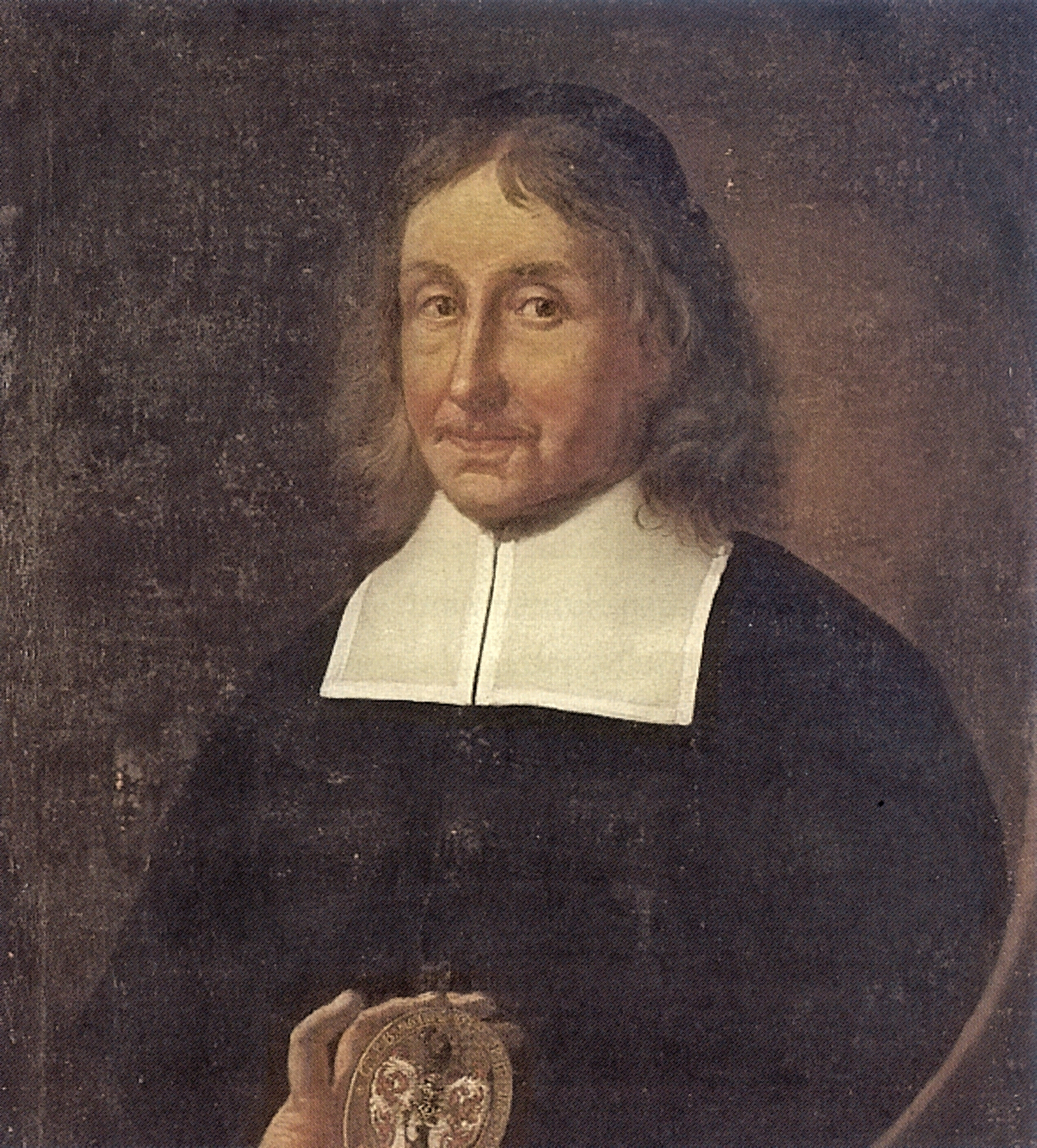
Cornelius Berenberg (1634–1711)

Hans Berenberg's son was also named Hans Berenberg (1593–1640), and was married to Adelheid Ruhlant (1611–1684), daughter of the advocate Rütger Ruhlant (1568–1630) who was ennobled by the Holy Roman Emperor in 1622, and Catarina de Greve (1582–1655). Their son, Cornelius Berenberg (1634–1711), was the first to engage in merchant banking and developed the company into a very successful merchant house and merchant bank. He forged trade links with France, Spain, Portugal, Italy, Scandinavia and Russia. Family connections of the Berenbergs were instrumental to the development, especially in Livorno and Lisbon with its colonies of wealthy Dutch merchants. Cornelius Berenberg was also the first Berenberg to take the oath as a Hamburg burgher in 1684; the family thus became part of Hamburg's ruling class of Grand Burghers.

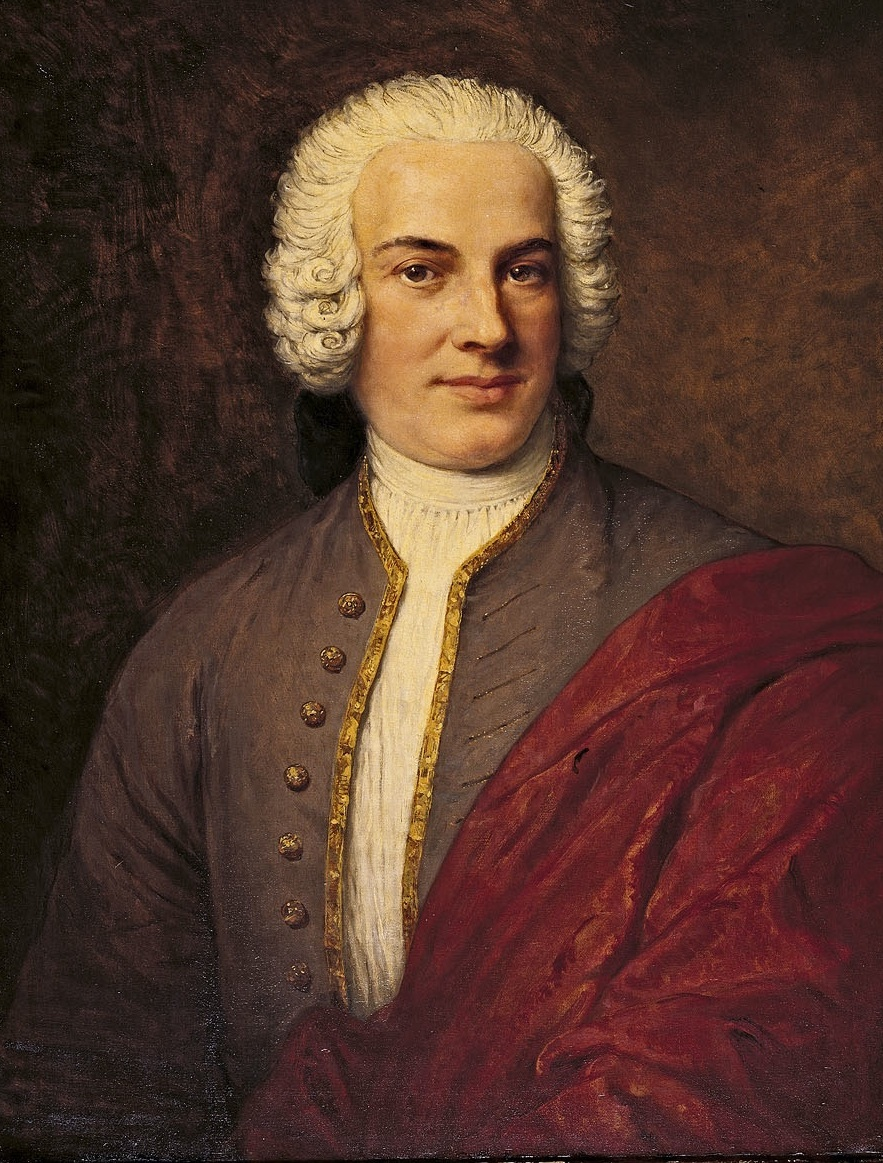
Johann Berenberg (1718–1772), owner of Berenberg Bank

Cornelius Berenberg's son, Rudolf Berenberg (1680–1746), was elected a Senator in 1735. By the mid 18th century, investment banking and acceptance credits comprised a significant part of the firm's activities. Rudolf Berenberg was married to Anna Elisabeth Amsinck (1690–1748), the daughter of Paul Amsinck (1649–1706), a merchant of Hamburg and Lisbon, who was descended from the Welser family. They were the parents of Rudolf Berenberg (1712–61), a merchant in Hamburg, Cornelius Berenberg (1714–73), a merchant in Livorno, Senator Paul Berenberg (1716–1768) and of Johann Berenberg (1718–1772), a co-owner and later sole owner of the Berenberg company.

=== The Gossler and Seyler families ===
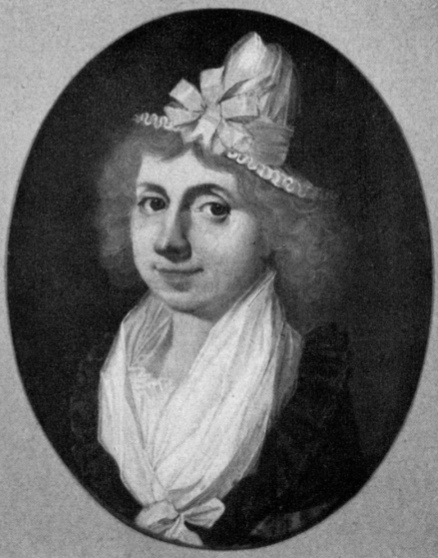
Elisabeth Berenberg (1749–1822), co-owner of Berenberg Bank and wife of Johann Hinrich Gossler. Upon her death, the Berenberg family became extinct in the male line.

The Berenberg family were merchants, bankers and senators in Hamburg for almost two centuries until the banking branch of the Berenberg family became extinct in the male line. However, Berenberg Bank was passed on to the descendants of Johann Berenberg (1718–1772) in the female line. After Senator Paul Berenberg died childless in 1768, his brother Johann Berenberg took on his son-in-law Johann Hinrich Gossler (1738–90) as a partner and eventually sole heir, as he was married to Johann Berenberg's only surviving child, Elisabeth Berenberg (1749–1822). The Gossler family is known in Hamburg since the 17th century, when Johann Hinrich Gossler's great-grandfather Claus Gossler (1630–1713) was a Hamburg burgher. The historian Percy Ernst Schramm describes their marriage as a marriage of convenience; she was not considered beautiful, but was intelligent, cultivated, kind, spoke many languages (including Latin) and became an exemplary wife and mother. She survived her husband by 32 years and after his death managed the firm together with her son-in-law.

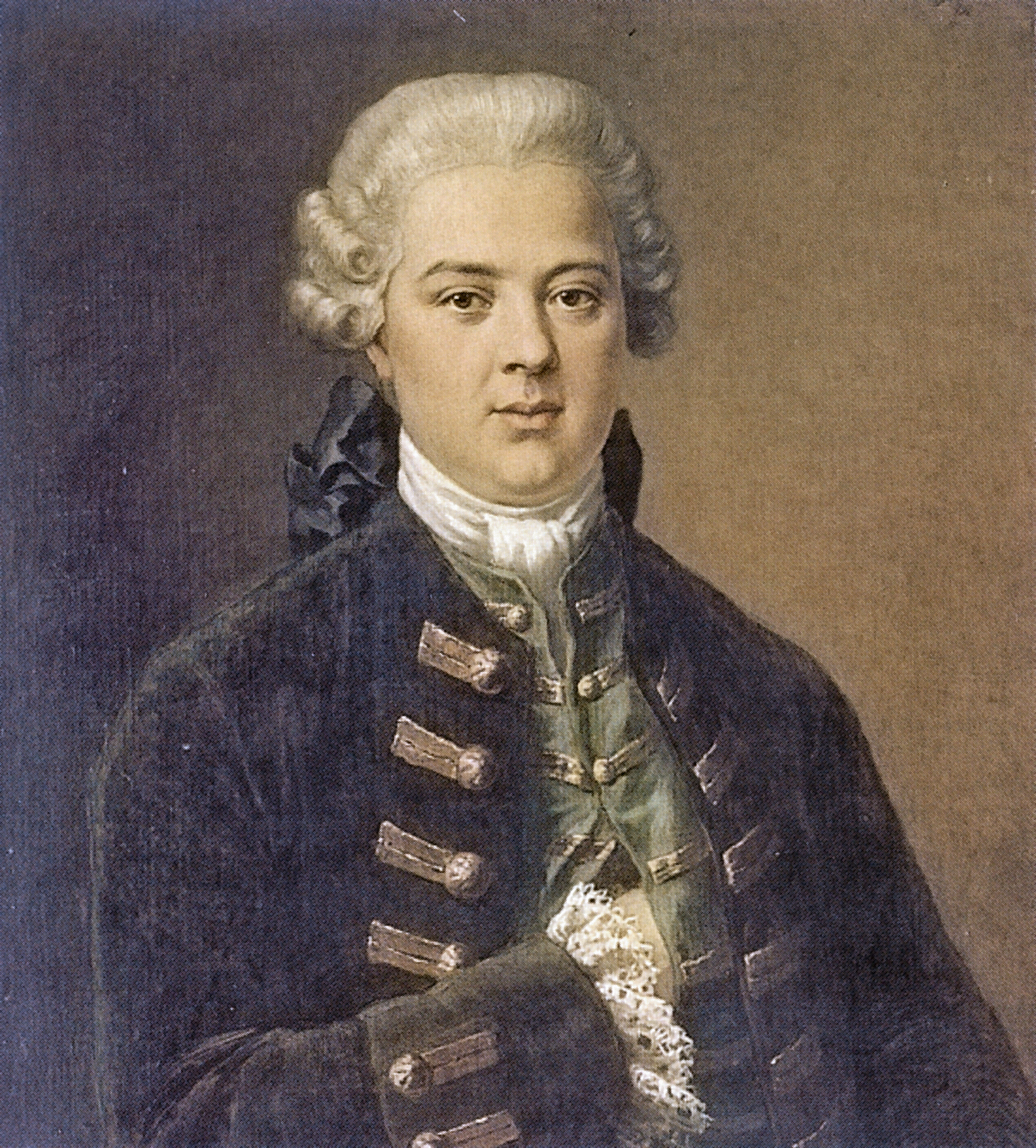
Johann Hinrich Gossler (1738–90), who married Elisabeth Berenberg (1749–1822)

In 1788, Johann Hinrich Gossler bought the Mortzenhaus palace in Alter Wandrahm 101 (later 21). Built in 1621 with a renaissance facade, it was one of the largest and most well known palaces in Hamburg. The building was owned by the Gossler family until the 1880s, when it was demolished to make room for the Speicherstadt.

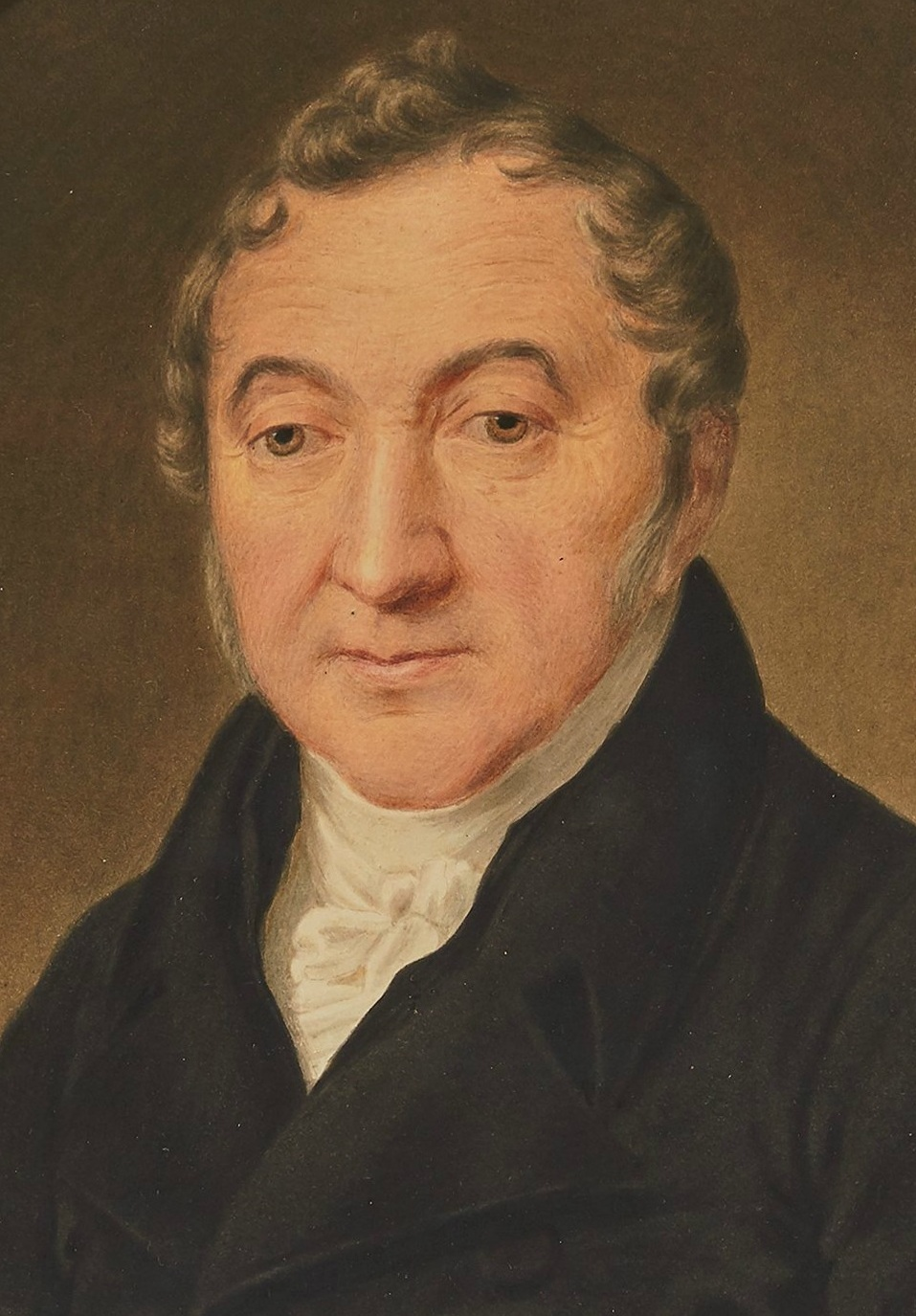
Ludwig Erdwin Seyler (1758–1836), who married Anna Henriette Gossler (1771–1836), eldest daughter of Johann Hinrich Gossler and Elisabeth Berenberg

Johann Hinrich Gossler and Elisabeth Berenberg's eldest daughter, Anna Henriette Gossler, was married to Ludwig Erdwin Seyler, a son of the famous theatre director Abel Seyler. In 1788, Johann Hinrich Gossler took on his son-in-law as a partner in the firm, and after Gossler's death in 1790, Seyler became head of the firm, which was renamed Joh. Berenberg, Gossler & Co. in 1791. He held several public offices in Hamburg and served as President of the Commerz-Deputation 1817–1818. During the Napoleonic War, Seyler temporarily moved the headquarters of the Berenberg company to the house of his son-in-law, Gerhard von Hosstrup. L.E. Seyler and Anna Henriette Gossler's children were briefly co-owners of Berenberg Bank, and they have many prominent descendants in Hamburg and Norway with family names such as von Hosstrup, Wegner and Paus.

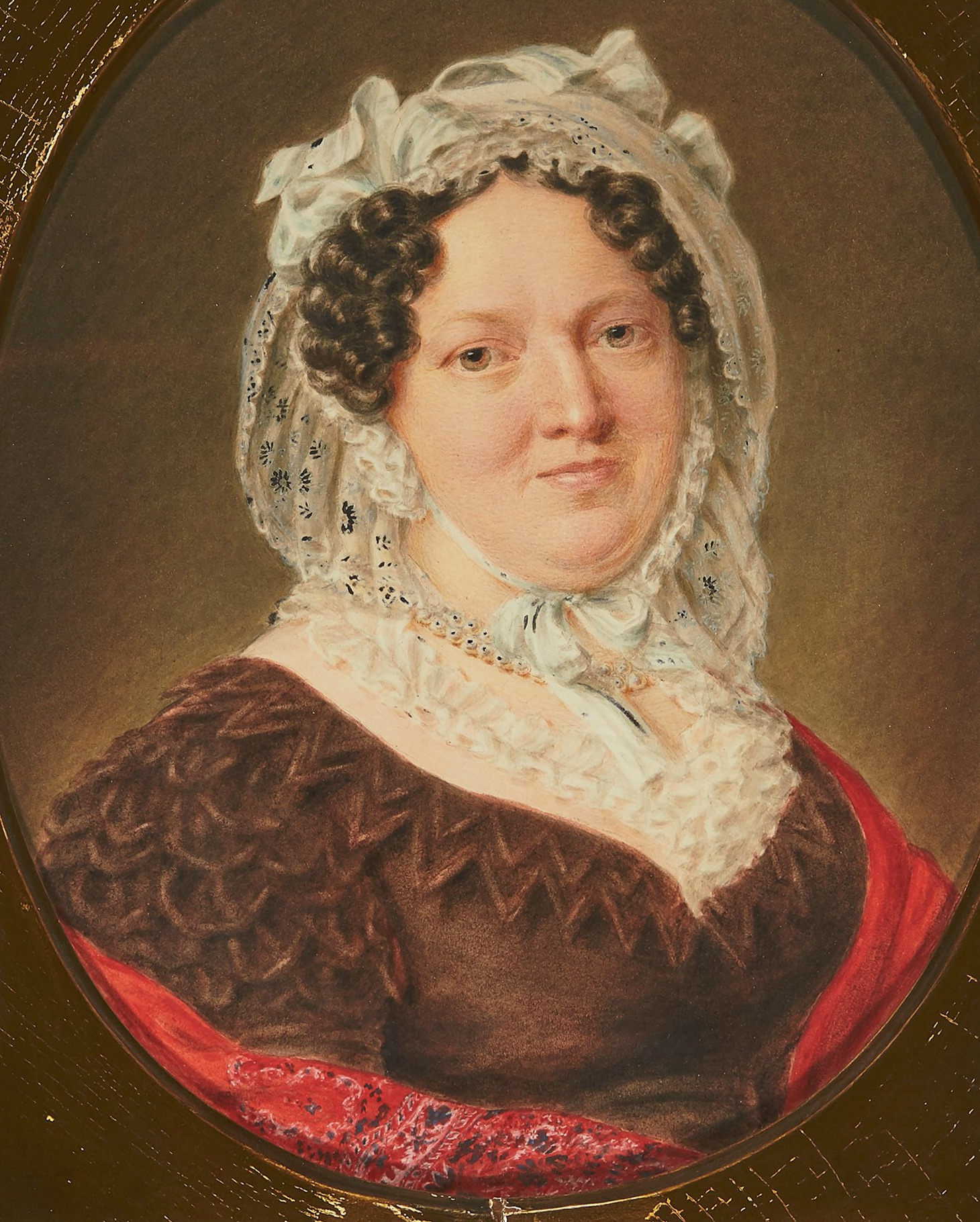
Anna Henriette Gossler (1775–1842), eldest child of Johann Hinrich Gossler and Elisabeth Berenberg, married to the Berenberg company's longtime head L.E. Seyler

Anna Henriette Gossler's younger brother Johann Heinrich Gossler became a partner in 1798, and was elected a senator of Hamburg in 1821. Several other family members also served as senators, with Hermann Gossler becoming First Mayor (a position equal to the federal princes, Bundesfürsten). In 1880, Johann Berenberg Gossler (who had Berenberg as a middle name) and his descendants were granted the name Berenberg-Gossler by the Hamburg Senate. The Berenberg-Gosslers were ennobled in the Kingdom of Prussia (which was technically a foreign country) in 1888 and raised to Baronial rank in 1910. The Prussian ennoblement was somewhat controversial in the family and in Hamburg, as the grand burghers of Hamburg mostly considered the nobility inferior to Hanseatic families. According to Richard J. Evans, "the wealthy of nineteenth-century Hamburg were for the most part stern republicans, abhorring titles, refusing to accord any deference to the Prussian nobility, and determinedly loyal to their urban background and mercantile heritage." As Johann Berenberg-Gossler was ennobled, his sister Susanne (married name Amsinck), exclaimed "Aber John, unser guter Name!" (But John, our good name!)

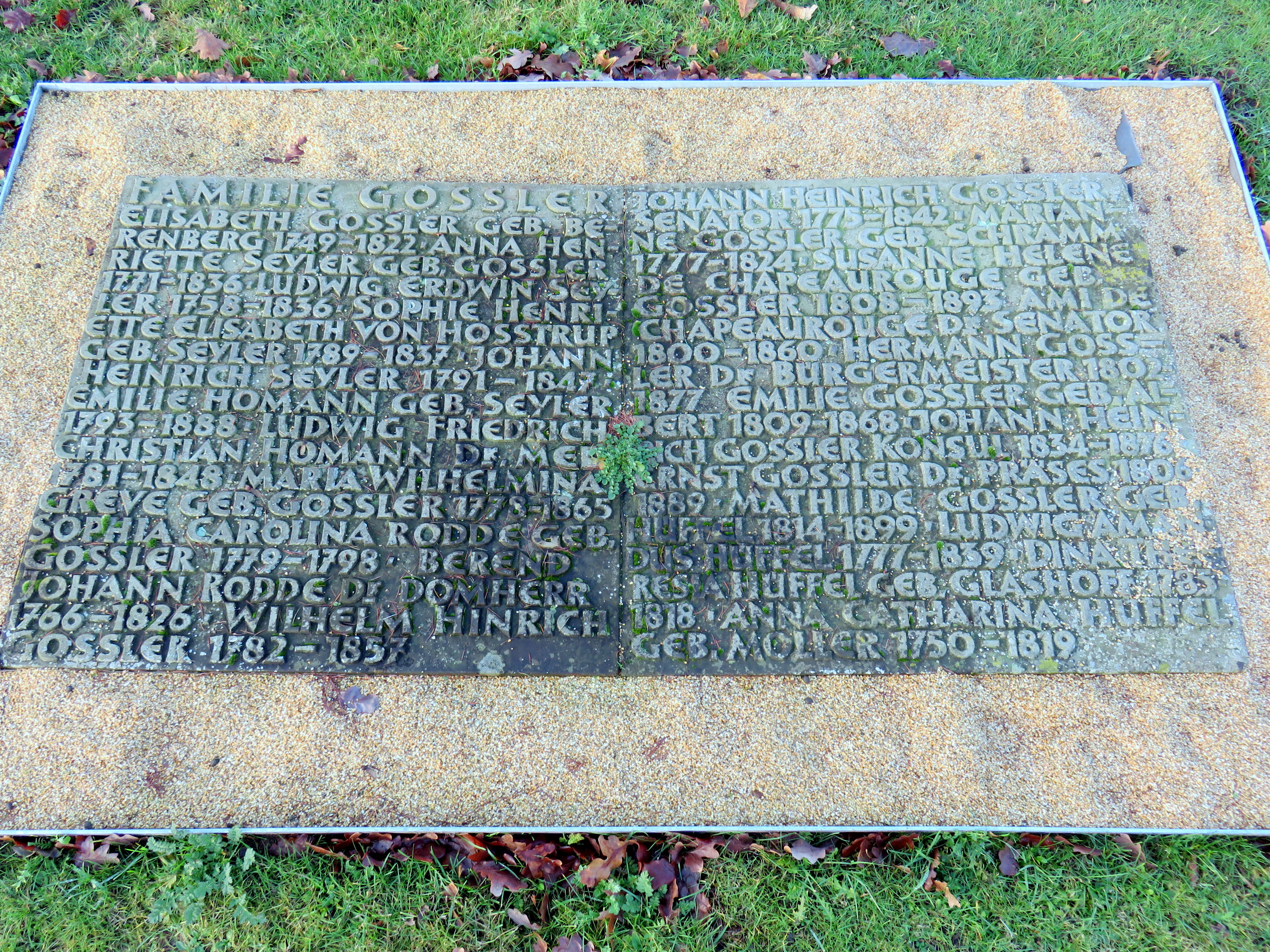
Grave of the Gossler family, including Elisabeth Berenberg, Ludwig Erdwin Seyler, Johann Heinrich Gossler and Hermann Gossler

In the 19th century, the Berenberg-Gosslers were strongly involved in the industrialisation process in northern Germany and in the North American trade and its finance. In 1847, the Berenberg-Gosslers were the main founders of the Hamburg America Line (HAPAG) together with the merchant house H.J. Merck & Co., and in 1857 they were among the main founders of the Norddeutscher Lloyd. They also financed the ironworks of Ilseder Hütte. The houses of Berenberg-Gossler, H.J. Merck and Salomon Heine were also the main founders of the Norddeutsche Bank in 1856, the first joint-stock bank in northern Germany and one of the predecessors of Deutsche Bank.

Since the early 19th century, Berenberg Bank had a close cooperation with Barings Bank of London, and its owners a close personal relationship with the Baring family.

During the Nazi era, the Berenberg-Gossler family—themselves descended from religious refugees—especially Baron Cornelius von Berenberg-Gossler, were strongly involved in helping Jewish-origined friends and associates in Hamburg who faced persecution, securing the release of Fritz Warburg in 1939.

Heinrich von Berenberg-Gossler was the last family member to serve as a personally liable partner (until 1979).

In Hamburg, the Gossler Park in Blankenese is named after the family.

In 18th and 19th century Hamburg, a marriage to a Berenberg/Gossler or the closely related Amsinck family could greatly advance one's social position, as was the case with Hamburg head of state Max Predöhl.

Wilhelm Gossler (1811–1895) was the grandfather of the painter and sculptor Mary Warburg, who was married to the art historian and cultural theorist Aby Warburg, a member of the Warburg banking family.

Joachim von Berenberg-Consbruch (né Consbruch) and other people named Berenberg-Consbruch are not descended from the Berenberg family; he acquired the name by civil name change in Hamburg in 1976. He worked for the bank and his stepfather was a Berenberg-Gossler.

== Properties ==
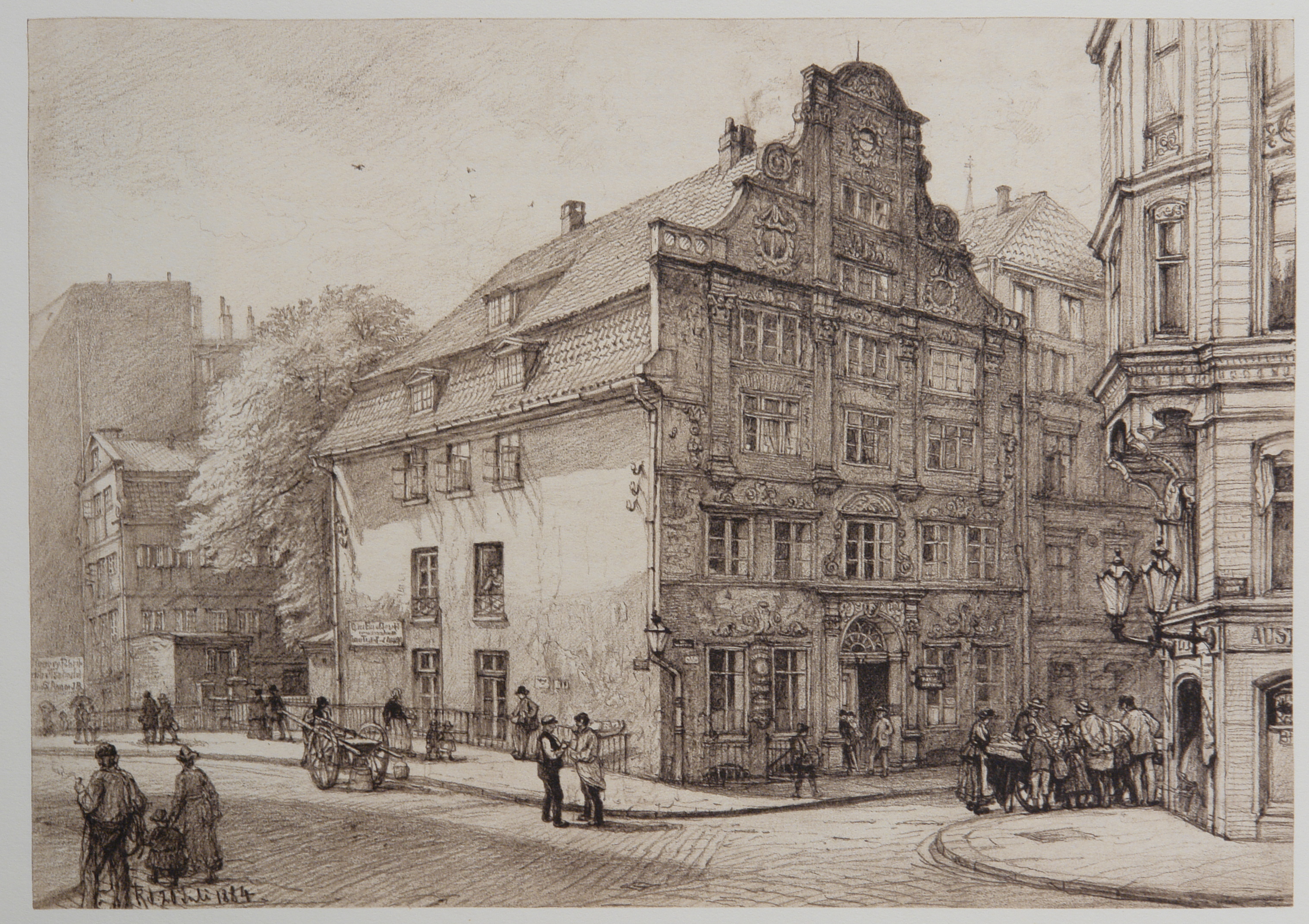
The large building in Alte Gröningerstraße 20, bought in 1755 by Paul Berenberg as seat of the Berenberg company

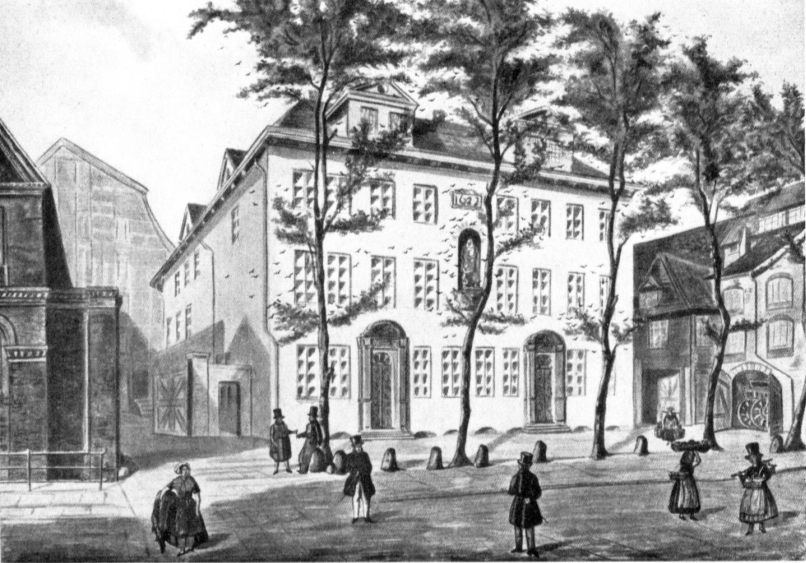
The Mortzenhaus, city residence of Johann Hinrich Gossler and his family and seat of Berenberg Bank from 1788. During the summer, the family lived on a property outside the city.

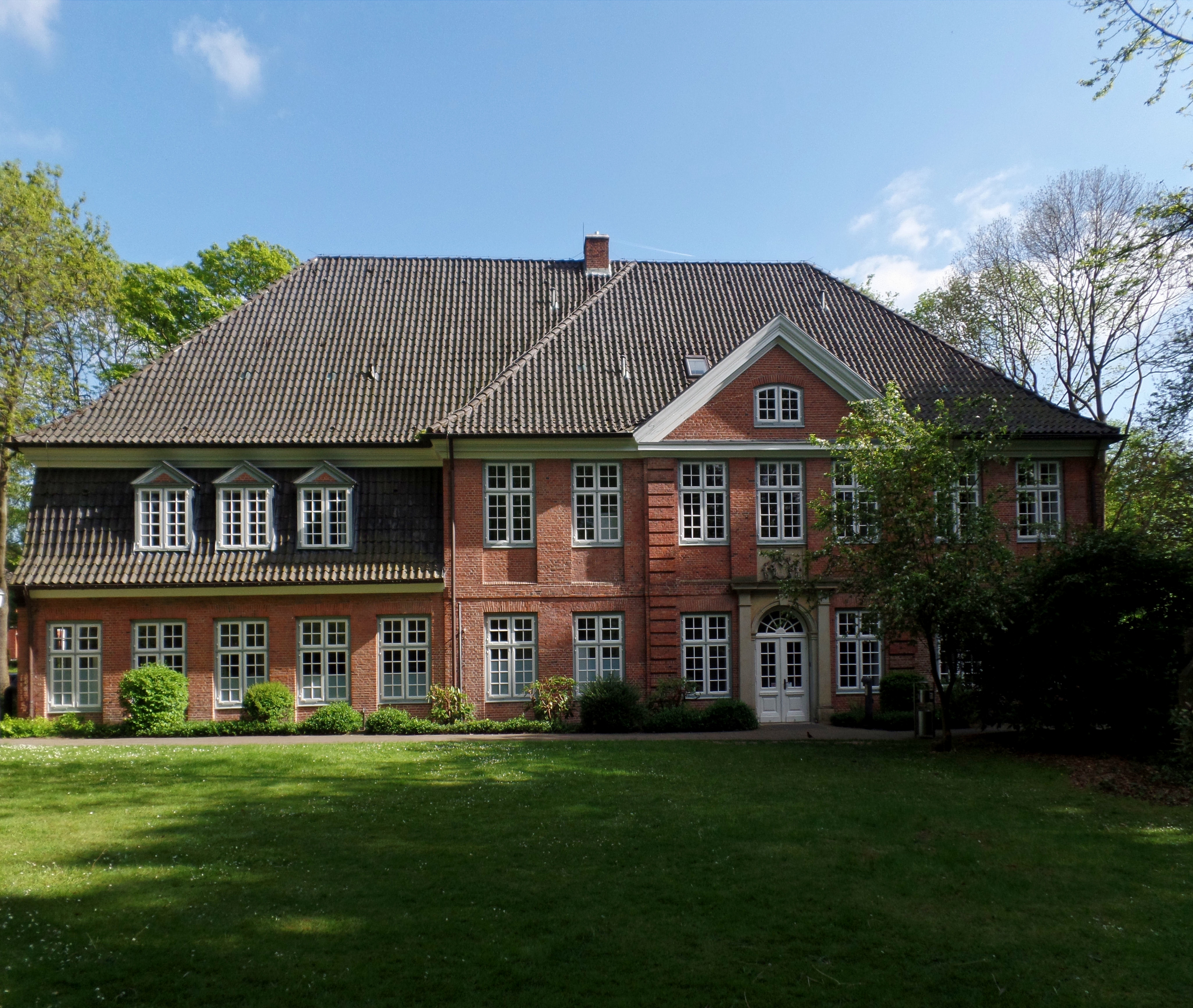
Frustberg House served as summer residence of Elisabeth Gossler née Berenberg from 1793 to 1822. It was built by Johann Hinrich Gossler's great-grandfather, cloth merchant Eybert Tiefbrunn, in 1703.

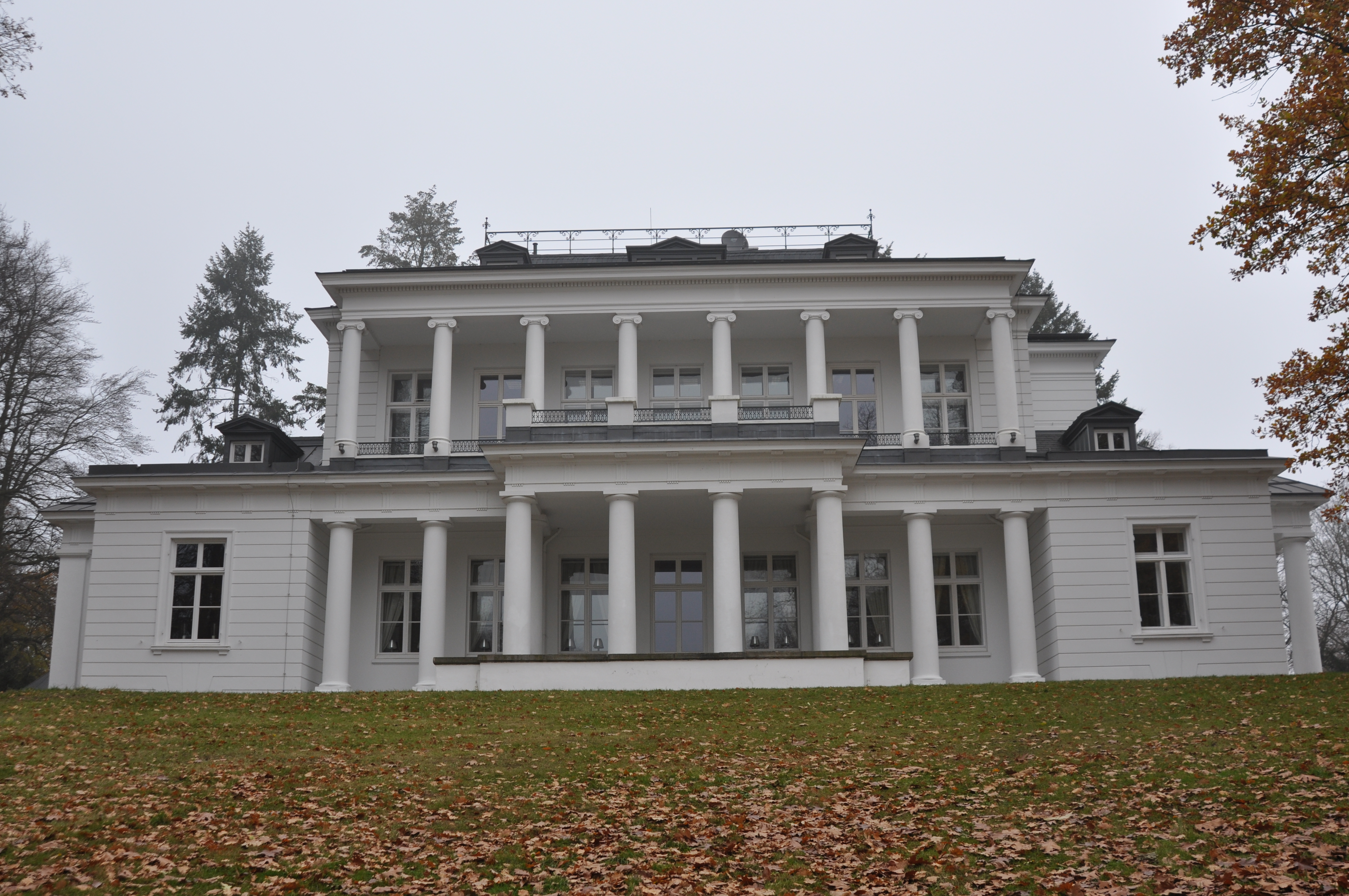
Goßlerhaus, a manor house in Blankenese, built for John Henry Gossler

== Gallery ==
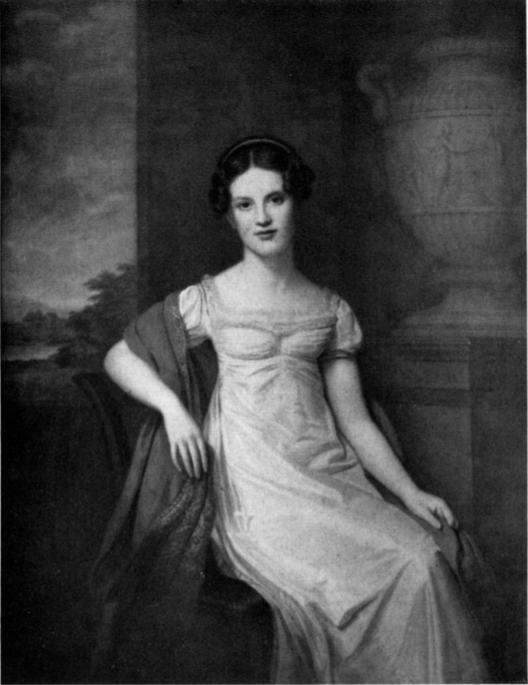
Emilie Gossler (1799–1875), daughter of Senator Johann Heinrich Gossler and wife of business magnate Johannes Amsinck (1792–1879), who earned a fortune trading with South American countries. Painted in 1818 by Friedrich Carl Gröger.

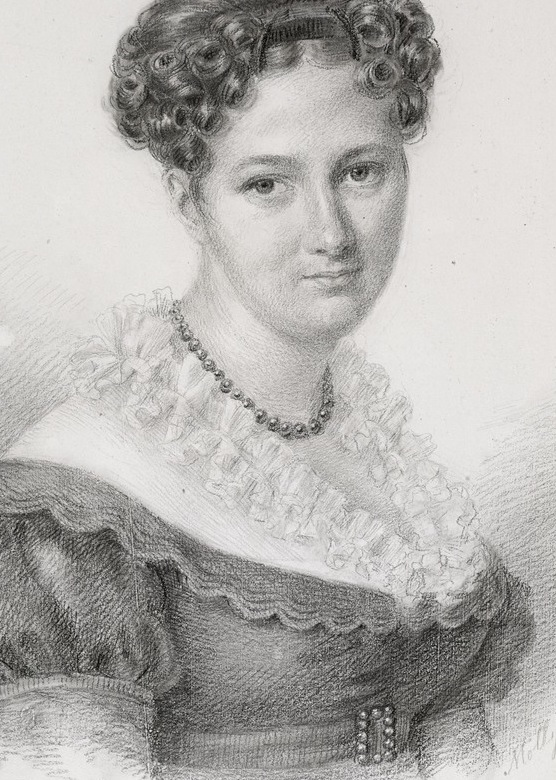
Henriette Seyler (1805–75), daughter of Berenberg Bank head and co-owner L.E. Seyler and Anna Henriette Gossler, and wife of the Norwegian industrialist Benjamin Wegner. Drawn by her sister Molly in 1827.

== Coat of arms ==
The Berenbergs used as their coat of arms a bear (im goldenen Felde auf einem grünen Schildfuß ein nach rechts aufgerichteter schwarzer Bär mit goldenem Halsband, in den Vorderpranken einen grünen Zweig haltend). The coat of arms is known since the 17th century and was most likely adopted no later than the 16th century in Lier, Belgium. As of 1699, the Berenberg coat of arms was still visible in the church windows in Lier.

In 1773, Johann Hinrich Gossler adopted as his coat of arms a goose foot. From 1832, the family used a more complicated coat of arms.

Upon being ennobled by Prussia in 1889, the family was granted a coat of arms combining the Berenberg and 1773 Gossler coats of arms. This coat of arms is also used as the logo of Berenberg Bank.

Berenberg coat of arms, used since the 16th century

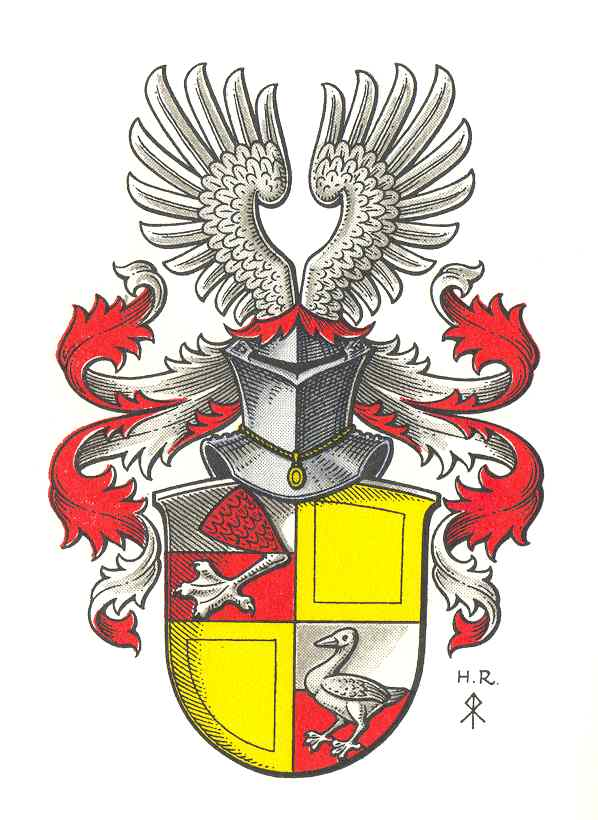
Coat of arms of the Gossler family, as used from 1832. The goose foot was adopted as the Gossler arms by Johann Hinrich Gossler in 1773

A highly stylized version of the combined Berenberg/Gossler coat of arms, used as a logo by Berenberg Bank

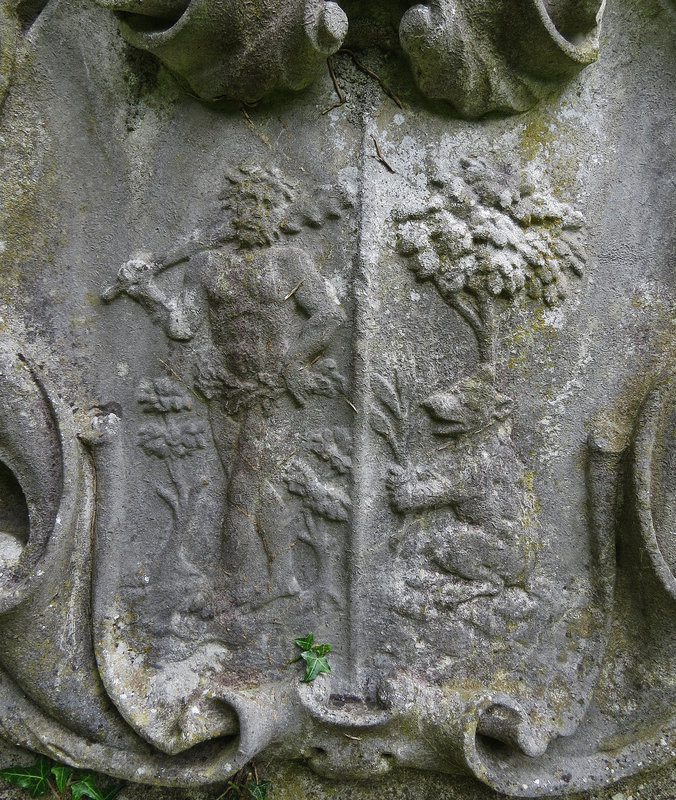
A 1727 variant of the Berenberg arms (a bear sitting under a tree holding a palm branch in his paws ppr.) on the grave of Sarah Anna Berenberg and her husband, Sir Peter Meyer, in London

== Lineage ==
Berenberg Bank partners in bold.

=== The Berenberg family ===
The following is the male line Berenberg family, that became extinct in the male line with Elisabeth Berenberg in 1822.

- 1. Jan Berenberg (1490–1549), burgher of Lier, married Engele Segers
  - 2. Paul Berenberg (1533–1603), merchant in Antwerp, married Anna Kriekhart (1537–)
    - 3. **Hans Berenberg** (1561–1626), merchant in Hamburg, married Anna Snellinck (1557–1635), daughter of Andries Snellinck (1531–1606) and Françoise (Francina) de Rénialme (1539–1610)
      - 4. Francina Berenberg (1591–1628), married Arnold Amsinck (1579–1656)
      - 4. **Hans Berenberg** (1593–1640), merchant, married 1) Elisabeth Amsinck (1602–1630) and 2) Adelheid Ruhlant (1611–1684), daughter of Rütger Ruhlant (1568–1630, ennobled 1622) and Catarina de Greve (1582–1655)
        - 5. (of father's first marriage) **Johann (John) Berenberg** (1622–1699), merchant, married Magdalene de Hertoghe (1619–1694)
        - 5. **Rudolf Berenberg** (1623–1672), merchant, married Susanna de Hertoghe (1617–1674)
        - 5. (of father's second marriage) **Cornelius Berenberg** (1634–1711), merchant, married Anna Margaretha Colin (1649–1684), daughter of Daniel Colin (1615–1660) and Elisabeth Adelheid Engels (1620–1659)
          - 6. **Rudolf Berenberg** (1680–1746), merchant, President of the Commerz-Deputation 1728–1729 and Senator from 1735, married Anna Elisabeth Amsinck (1690–1748), daughter of Paul Amsinck (1649–1706) and Christina Adelheid Capelle (1663–1730)
            - 7. **Rudolf Berenberg** (1712–1761), merchant in Hamburg
            - 7. Cornelius Berenberg (1714–1773), merchant in Livorno
            - 7. **Paul Berenberg** (1716–1768), Senator, co-owner of Berenberg Bank
            - 7. **Johann Berenberg** (1718–1772), sole owner of Berenberg Bank, married Anna Maria Lastrop (1723–1761)
              - 8. Rudolf Berenberg (1748–1768)
              - 8. **Elisabeth Berenberg** (1749–1822), married **Johann Hinrich Gossler** (1738–90), sole owner of Berenberg Bank
                - **for descendants of Elisabeth Berenberg and Johann Hinrich Gossler, see section below**
        - 5. Anna Berenberg (1639–1669), married Rudolf Capelle (1635–1684)
          - 6. Christina Adelheid Capelle (1663–1730), married Paul Amsinck (see above)
      - 4. Andreas Berenberg (1595–1661), merchant in Hamburg, married Sara de Hertoghe (1605–1678)
        - 5. Hans Heinrich Berenberg (1623–1701)
          - 6. Paul Berenberg (1659–1712), merchant in London
          - 6. John Henry Berenberg (1663–1701), merchant in London, English citizen 1693, married Elizabeth Lisette, daughter of Sir Richard Lisette
          - 6. Sarah Anna Berenberg (1665–), married Sir Peter Meyer, merchant in London
      - 4. Anna Berenberg (1599–1639), married Senator Hermann Langenbeck (1596–1668)
    - 3. **Paul Berenberg** (1566–1645), married Francina Snellinck (1559–1642)
      - 4. Francina Berenberg (1601–1641), married Johan van Uffelen (1589–1657), whose descendants include King Willem-Alexander of the Netherlands

=== The Berenberg/Gossler family ===
The following are the descendants of Elisabeth Berenberg and Johann Hinrich Gossler, the founders of the Berenberg-Gossler family. The numbers are continued from the section above.

- 8. **Elisabeth Berenberg** (1749–1822), co-owner of Berenberg Bank, married **Johann Hinrich Gossler** (1738–90), sole owner and head of Berenberg Bank
  - 9. Anna Henriette Gossler (1771–1836), married **Ludwig Erdwin Seyler** (1758–1836), co-owner and head of Berenberg Bank, President of the Commerz-Deputation 1817–1818
    - 10. **Sophie Henriette Elisabeth ("Betty") Seyler** (1789–1837), co-owner of Berenberg Bank (1836), married Gerhard von Hosstrup (1771–1851)
      - 11. Egmont von Hosstrup (1813–1876)
      - 11. Bertha von Hosstrup (1814–1902), married Albert Hänel
      - 11. Elisabeth von Hosstrup
    - 10. **Johann Heinrich Seyler**, co-owner of Berenberg Bank (1836)
    - 10. **Emilie ("Emmy") Seyler**, co-owner of Berenberg Bank (1836), married Homann
    - 10. **Louise Auguste Seyler**, co-owner of Berenberg Bank (1836), married Gerhard von Hosstrup (1771–1851)
    - 10. **Maria ("Molly") Seyler**, co-owner of Berenberg Bank (1836)
    - 10. **Louise ("Wischen") Seyler** (1799–1849), co-owner of Berenberg Bank (1836), married Ernst Friedrich Pinckernelle (1787–1868)
    - 10. **Henriette Seyler** (1805–1875), co-owner of Berenberg Bank (1836), married Norwegian industrialist Benjamin Wegner (1795–1864)
      - 11. Johan Ludwig Wegner (1830–1893), judge in Norway, married Blanca Bretteville, daughter of Prime Minister Christian Zetlitz Bretteville
        - 12. Olga Wegner (1858–1943), married supreme court justice Karenus Kristofer Thinn
      - 11. Heinrich Benjamin Wegner (1833–1911), timber merchant, married Henriette Vibe, daughter of classical philologist Frederik Ludvig Vibe
      - 11. Elisabeth Sophie Dorothea Henriette Wegner (1838–1906), married colonel and aide-de-camp to King Charles Hans Jacob Nørregaard
        - 12. Benjamin Wegner Nørregaard (1861–1935), war correspondent and government minister in China
        - 12. Ludvig Paul Rudolf Nørregaard (1863–1928), wine merchant and Norwegian consul in Tarragona
        - 12. Harald Nørregaard (1864–1938), barrister and Chairman of the Norwegian Bar Association
      - 11. Anna Henriette Wegner (1841–1918), married private school owner Bernhard Cathrinus Pauss
        - 12. Nikolai Nissen Paus (1877–1956), surgeon and President of the Norwegian Red Cross
        - 12. Henriette Wegner Paus (1879–1942), married to private school owner Theodor Haagaas
        - 12. Augustin Thoresen Paus (1881–1945), hydropower executive
        - 12. George Wegner Paus (1882–1923), barrister and Director at the Norwegian Employers' Confederation
        - 12. Karoline Louise Paus (1884–1967), married to barrister Thorleif Ellestad
      - 11. George Mygind Wegner (1847–1881), barrister
  - 9. Johann Nicolaus Gossler (1774-1848)
  - 9. **Johann Heinrich Gossler** II (1775–1842) (birth year reported as 1772 by some sources), Senator, co-owner of Berenberg Bank
    - 10. Emilie Gossler (1799-1875), married Johannes Amsinck (1792–1879)
    - 10. Hermann Gossler (1802–1877), Senator and First Mayor
      - 11. Johann Heinrich Gossler (1834–1876), merchant, Hamburg Consul in Boston from 1864, later representative of the North German Confederation and the German Empire until 1872
      - 11. Hermann Gossler (1845–1908), lawyer and judge in Hamburg
    - 10. **Johann Heinrich Gossler** III (1805-1879), co-owner of Berenberg Bank, consul-general of Hawaii, married Mary Elizabeth Bray (1810–1886), a granddaughter of Samuel Eliot
      - 11. Marianne Gossler (1830–1908), married Friedrich Wilhelm Burchard (1824–1892), co-owner of Berenberg Bank
        - 12. Johann Heinrich Burchard (1852–1912), First Mayor, married Emily Henriette Amsinck (1858–1931)
        - 12. Ulrich Hermann Christoph Burchard (1861–1926), married Olga Juliane Amsinck (1865–)
      - 11. Frances Eliot Gossler (1832–59), married Hermann Ludwig Behn (1820–1901)
      - 11. Susanne Catharine Gossler (1835–), married Martin Garlieb Amsinck (1831–1905)
      - 11. Baron **Johann von Berenberg-Gossler** (known as John) (1839–1913), co-owner of Berenberg Bank, married to Juliane Amalie Donner (1843–1916)
        - 12. **John von Berenberg-Gossler** (1866–1943), Senator, Ambassador
        - 12. Frances von Berenberg-Gossler (1868–1951), married Baron Hans von Berlepsch
        - 12. Baron **Cornelius von Berenberg-Gossler** (1874–1953), co-owner of Berenberg Bank, married Nadia Clara von Oesterreich
          - 13. Clara Nadia von Berenberg-Gossler (1899–), married Emmo von Specht
          - 13. Cornelius Johann Constantin von Berenberg-Gossler (1901–1942)
          - 13. Cornelia Nadia Julie von Berenberg-Gossler (1905–)
          - 13. Baron **Heinrich von Berenberg-Gossler** (1907–1997), co-owner of Berenberg Bank, consul general of Monaco
            - 14. Baron Cornelius von Berenberg-Gossler
            - 14. Heinrich von Berenberg-Gossler (publisher), founder of Berenberg Verlag
          - 13. Cornelius Johann Heinrich Hellmuth von Berenberg-Gossler (1909–), married Irmgard Else Meyer
            - 14. Cornelius Johann Heinrich Gerhard von Berenberg-Gossler
            - 14. Clarita Irmela Nadia von Berenberg-Gossler, married Count Hartwig (Rabe) Joachim Cornelius Alexander von Bernstorff
          - 13. Cornelius Paul Hellmuth von Berenberg-Gossler (1911–), married Maria Luise Francke
            - 14. Johann David Rudolf Cornelius von Berenberg-Gossler
            - 14. Alexander John von Berenberg-Gossler
          - 13. Nadia von Berenberg-Gossler
        - 12. **Andreas von Berenberg-Gossler** (1880–1938), co-owner of Berenberg Bank, married Agnes Victorina von Francois
          - 13. Maria Nadia von Berenberg-Gossler (1908–)
        - 12. Herbert von Berenberg-Gossler (1883–1918), Professor Dr.med. et phil., married Anna Jutta Sara Elisabeth von Mallinckrodt
      - 11. John Henry Gossler (1849–1914), merchant
    - 10. Ernst Gossler (1806–1889), married Mathilde Huffel
      - 11. Oscar Gossler (1843–), married Elizabeth Gossler (1848–)
        - 12. Emmy Gossler, married Wilhelm Amsinck (1869–)
    - 10. Susanna Helene Gossler (1808–1893), married Senator Ami de Chapeaurouge
    - 10. **Wilhelm Gossler** (1811–1895), married Margarete Elisabeth Donner, served as President of the Commerz-Deputation 1853
      - 11. Maria Gossler (1844–1915), married Hamburg senator A.F. Hertz
        - 12. Mary Hertz (1866–1934), painter and sculptor, married Aby Warburg
      - 11. Elizabeth Gossler (1848–), married Oscar Gossler (1843–) (see above)
    - 10. Gustav Gossler (1813–1844)

== Notable descendants of Johann Hinrich Gossler and Elisabeth Berenberg ==
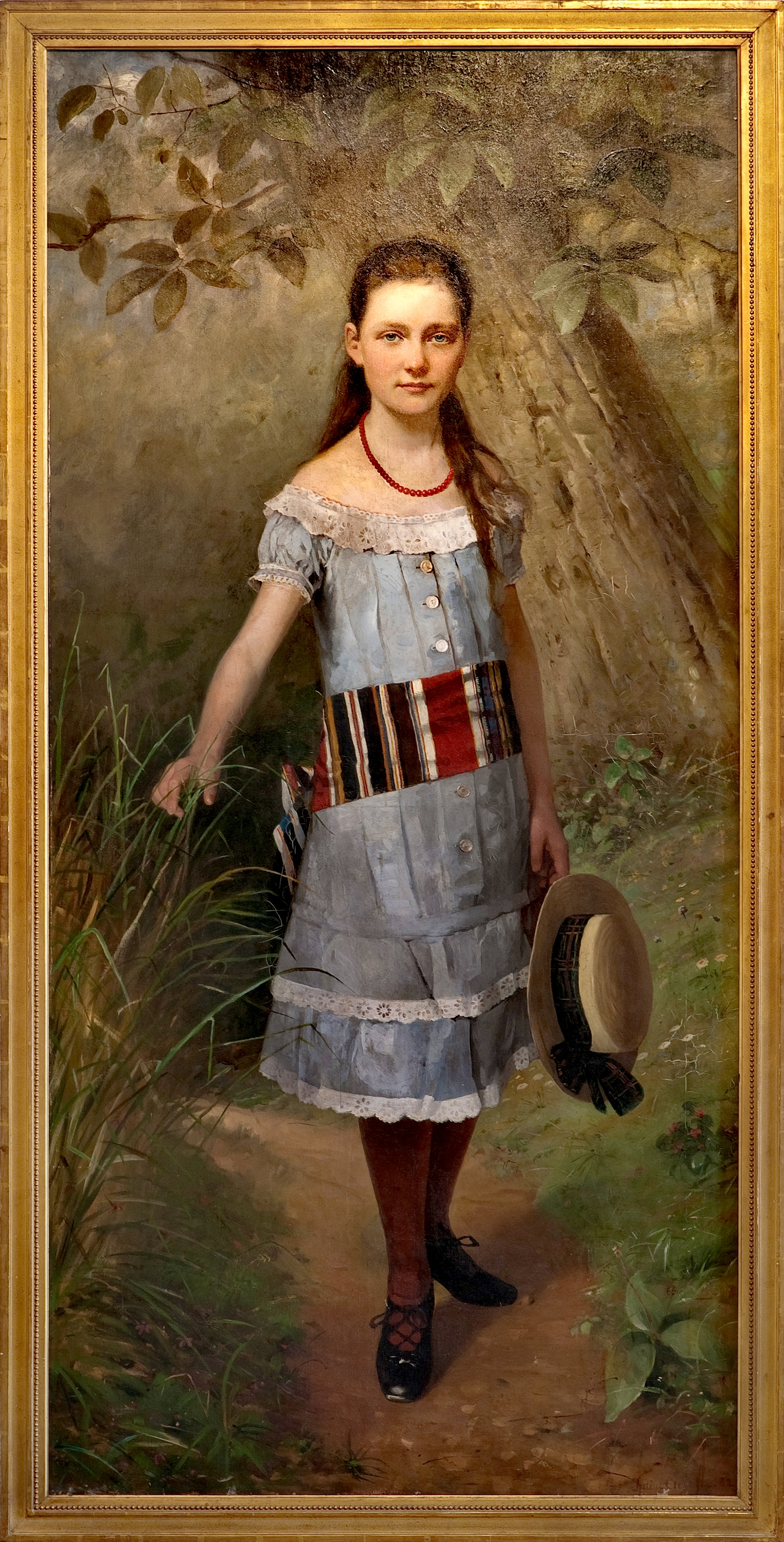
Child portrait of Helene Kaemmerer (1869–1953), daughter of banker Georg Heinrich Kaemmerer and maternal granddaughter of Hamburg head of state Hermann Gossler (exhibited in the Hamburg Museum)

Johann Hinrich Gossler and Elisabeth Berenberg, founders of the Berenberg-Gossler family, have many notable descendants in Germany, Norway and other countries with names including Gossler, Seyler, von Berenberg-Gossler, von Hosstrup, Pinckernelle, Schramm, Burchard, Wegner, Amsinck, Paus, Kaemmerer and von Bernstorff.

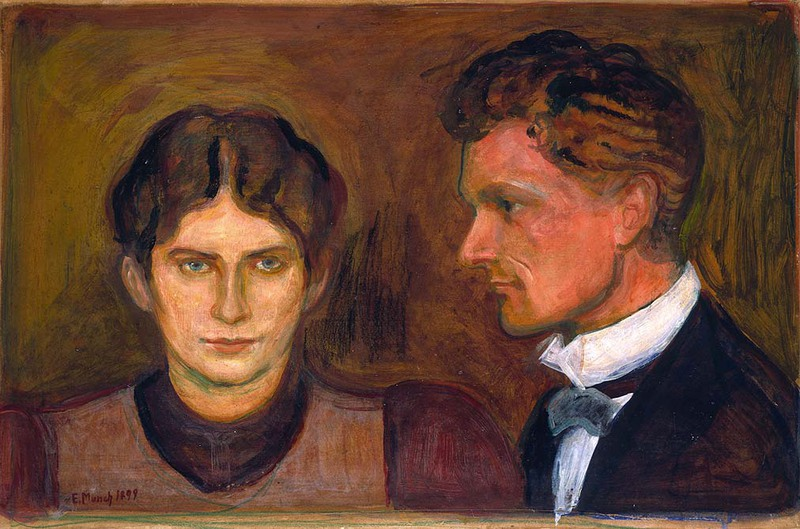
Ludwig Erdwin Seyler and Anna Henriette Gossler's great-grandson Harald Nørregaard, painted by Edvard Munch (1899). The painting is owned by the National Gallery of Norway

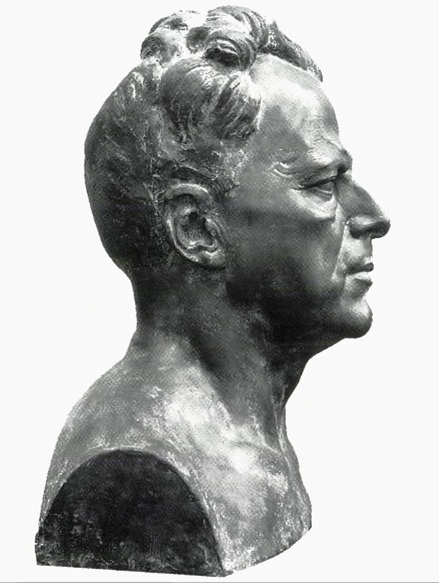
Nikolai Nissen Paus, President of the Norwegian Red Cross

- Martin Garlieb Amsinck, ship-owner
- Johann Heinrich Burchard, First Mayor of Hamburg
- Wilhelm Amsinck Burchard-Motz, Senator and Second Mayor of Hamburg
- Hermann Gossler, First Mayor of Hamburg
- Johann Heinrich Gossler, Senator
- Baron Cornelius von Berenberg-Gossler, banker
- Baron Heinrich von Berenberg-Gossler, banker
- Baron Johann von Berenberg-Gossler, banker
- John von Berenberg-Gossler, Senator, German Ambassador to Italy
- Egmont von Hosstrup, publisher
- Benjamin Wegner Nørregaard, Norwegian war correspondent
- Harald Nørregaard, supreme court advocate and chairman of the Norwegian Bar Association, friend of Edvard Munch
- Nikolai Nissen Paus, humanitarian, President of the Norwegian Red Cross
- George Wegner Paus, barrister and Director at the Norwegian Employers' Confederation
- Bernhard Paus, humanitarian, Grand Master of the Norwegian Order of Freemasons
- Gustav and Johann Ernst Pinckernelle, insurance brokers
- Percy Ernst Schramm, historian

== Other Berenberg descendants ==
Among other Berenberg descendants are members of virtually all old Hamburg Hanseatic families, as well as King Willem-Alexander of the Netherlands (a descendant of Berenberg Bank co-founder Paul Berenberg (1566–1645) and Francina Snellinck (1559–1642)).

== See also ==
- Seyler family
- Baron of Berenberg-Gossler

== Literature ==
- Clarita Bernstorff, Hartwig Bernstorff, Emanuel Eckardt, Change is the only constant: Berenberg; a history of one of the world's oldest banks, Hanser Literaturverlage, 336 pages, ISBN 978-1-56990-601-9
- "Freiherren von Berenberg-Gossler," in Genealogisches Handbuch des Adels, Band 16, Freiherrliche Häuser B II, C. A. Starke Verlag, Limburg (Lahn) 1957
- Berenberg/Gossler, Neue Deutsche Biographie
- A. Leesenberg, "Die Berenberg-Gossler," Vierteljahrsschrift für Heraldik, Sphragistik und Genealogie, IX, pp. 1–16, Carl Heymann's Verlag, Berlin, 1881.
- A. Leesenberg, "Genealogie der Familie Gossler," Vierteljahrsschrift für Heraldik, Sphragistik und Genealogie, IX, pp. 17–25, Carl Heymann's Verlag, Berlin, 1881.
- Percy Ernst Schramm, Neun Generationen: Dreihundert Jahre deutscher Kulturgeschichte im Lichte der Schicksale einer Hamburger Bürgerfamilie (1648–1948). Vol. I and II, Göttingen 1963/64.
- Percy Ernst Schramm, Kaufleute zu Haus und über See. Hamburgische Zeugnisse des 17., 18. und 19. Jahrhunderts, Hamburg, Hoffmann und Campe, 1949
- Percy Ernst Schramm, "Kaufleute während Besatzung, Krieg und Belagerung (1806–1815) : der Hamburger Handel in der Franzosenzeit, dargestellt an Hand von Firmen- und Familienpapieren." Tradition: Zeitschrift für Firmengeschichte und Unternehmerbiographie, Vol. 4. Jahrg., No. 1. (Feb 1959), pp. 1–22. https://www.jstor.org/stable/40696638
- Percy Ernst Schramm, "Hamburger Kaufleute in der 2. Hälfte des 18. Jahrhunderts," in: Tradition. Zeitschrift für Firmengeschichte und Unternehmerbiographie 1957, No 4., pp. 307–332. https://www.jstor.org/stable/40696554
- Percy Ernst Schramm, Die Vorfahren der Anna Maria Berenberg, geb. Lastrop (1723–61), 1957
- Hamburgische Biografie-Personenlexikon, Vol. 2, ed. by Franklin Kopitzsch, Dirk Brietzke
- Joh. Berenberg, Gossler & Co.: Die Geschichte eines deutschen Privatbankhauses, Berenberg Bank, Hamburg 1990
- Manfred Pohl, Handbook on the History of European Banks, European Association for Banking History, p. 362
- Renate Hauschild-Thiessen, "Johann Berenberg (1674–1749) und seine Genealogien," Hamburgische Geschichts- und Heimatblätter 10.8 (Dec 1981): 183–186
- Arne C. Wasmuth og Torsten A. Reimers, Hanseatische Dynastien. Alte Hamburger Familien öffnen ihre Alben, 2001, ISBN 3434525890

Furthermore, the Staatsarchiv Hamburg contains extensive Berenberg/Gossler materials.
