= Joachim von Berenberg-Consbruch =

German banker

Joachim von Berenberg-Consbruch (né Consbruch)
- Born: Hans-Joachim Consbruch; 5 November 1940 (age 84); Vienna
- Parents: Hans-Dietrich Wilhelm Consbruch (father); Irmgard Else Meyer (mother)

Hans-Joachim von Berenberg-Consbruch (born 5 November 1940 in Vienna), known as Hans-Joachim Consbruch from 1940 to 1976, is a German banker, who served as a personally liable partner at Berenberg Bank from 1978 to 2005. He has also been a board member of the Berenberg Bank Foundation, a philanthropic foundation. He is the honorary consul of Monaco in Hamburg.

Although he has worked for Berenberg Bank his entire career, he is not himself a member of, or descended from, the Berenberg family. He is the son of Hans-Dietrich Wilhelm Consbruch and Irmgard Else Meyer. His father, a middle class businessman, lived in Vienna at the time and died there in 1941. In 1949 his mother remarried to Cornelius Johann Heinrich Hellmuth von Berenberg-Gossler, a member of the prominent Hanseatic Berenberg-Gossler banking family. Hans-Joachim Consbruch, as he was known until 1976, studied law and then embarked on a career in the bank owned by his step-father's relatives. In 1976, at the age of 36, Hans-Joachim Consbruch obtained permission from Hamburg authorities to change his name to "von Berenberg-Consbruch," thus combining his family name Consbruch with the first part of his stepfather's name, the name of the Berenberg family, which is extinct in the male line.

He has two sons, Fabian and John.
