= Gossler's Park =

Park in Hamburg, Germany

Coordinates: 53.565°N 9.808°E

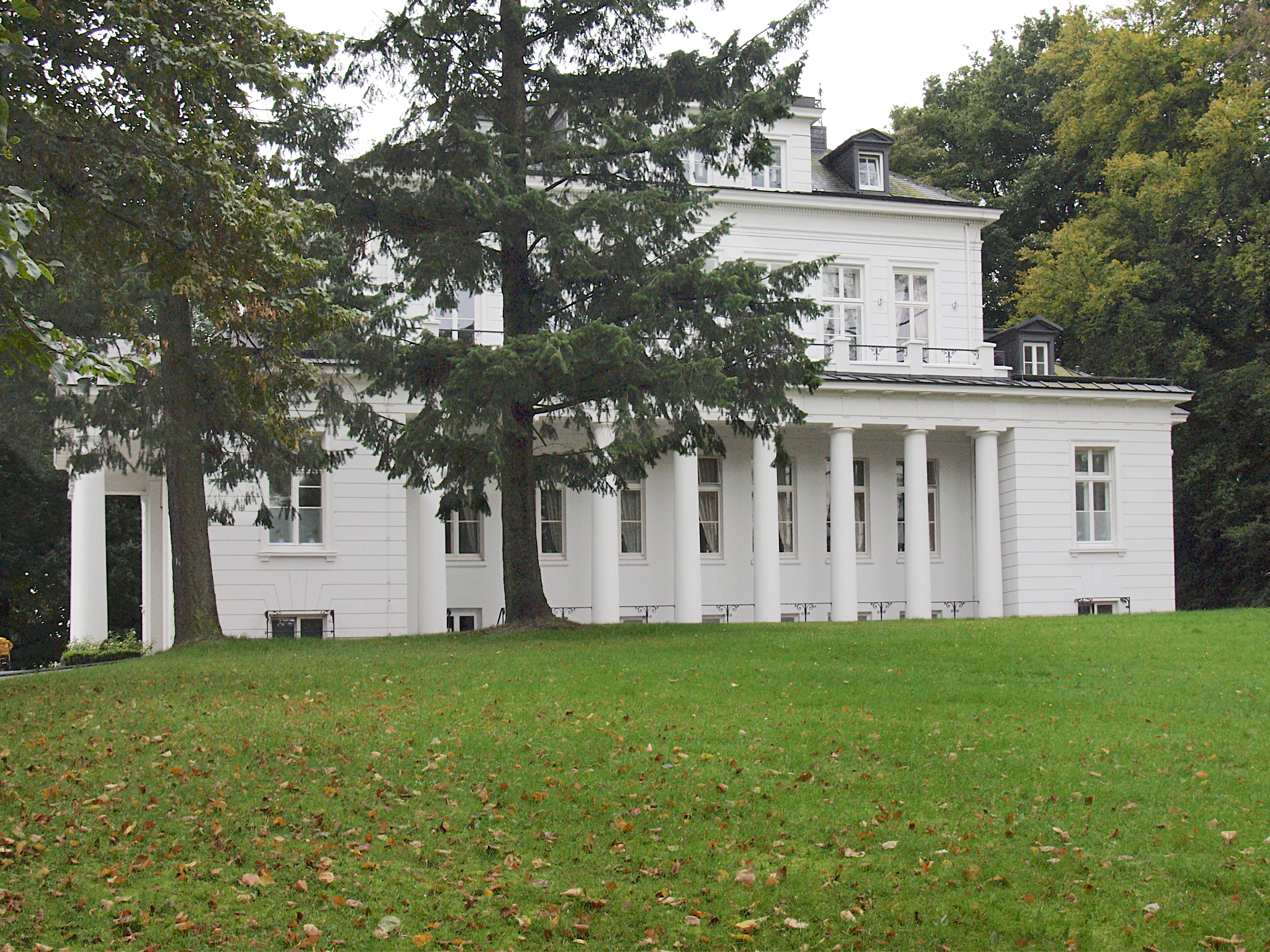
Gossler's Park

Gossler's Park (German: Goßlers Park) is a public park in Blankenese in Hamburg. It is located north of Blankeneser Landstraße and near Blankenese station. The park is named after the Gossler hanseatic banking family. The Goßlerhaus, a white mansion previously owned by the Gosslers, is located in the park.
