= Albert Hänel =

German jurist, legal historian, and politician

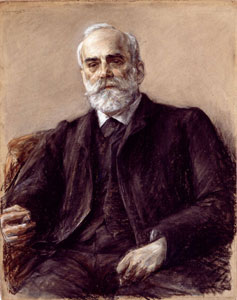
Albert Hänel painted by Max Liebermann

Albert Hänel (10 June 1833, in Leipzig – 12 May 1918, in Kiel) was a German jurist, legal historian and liberal politician. He was one of the leaders of the German Progress Party, and served as Rector of the University of Kiel. He served as a member of the Prussian Chamber of Deputies, the Reichstag of the North German Confederation and the Imperial Reichstag, and was Vice President of both the Prussian Chamber of Deputies and the Imperial Reichstag.

== Biography ==
Hänel was born in Leipzig. He studied at Vienna, Leipzig, and Heidelberg. The dramatist and politician Heinrich Laube was his stepfather. In 1860 he became Professor of Jurisprudence at the University of Königsberg and in 1863 at the University of Kiel. He served as Rector of the University of Kiel during 1892–1893.

One of the founders of the Liberal Party in Schleswig-Holstein after the annexation of the duchies to Prussia in 1866, he was elected to the Prussian Chamber of Deputies and the Reichstag of the North German Confederation, and subsequently to the Imperial Reichstag. He became known as a leader of the so-called “Fortschrittspartei” or Progressists. After the fusion with the Secessionists in 1884, “Fortschrittspartei” was styled as the “Deutschfreisinnige Partei.” Upon the breakup of the party in 1893, he represented the ‘Freisinnige Vereinigung’ (Liberal Union), but in the elections of the same year to the Reichstag he was defeated by the Social-Democratic candidate. In 1898 he was reelected.

He was married to Bertha von Hosstrup (1814–1902), a daughter of Gerhard von Hosstrup and granddaughter of Ludwig Erdwin Seyler.

== Works ==
Hänel's writings about the German Empire as a federal state and public law in general are characterized by his constitutionalism and opposition of legal positivism. He significantly influenced Heinrich Triepel, Rudolf Smend, Erich Kaufmann and Hermann Heller.

His writings include:

- Studien zum deutschen Staatsrecht (1873-1888)
  - Studie 1: Die vertragsmässigen Elemente der deutschen Reichsverfassung (1873)
  - Studie 2,1: Die organisatorische Entwicklung der Deutschen Reichsverfassung (1880)
  - Studie 2,2: Das Gesetz im formellen und materiellen Sinne (1888)
- Die Gesetzgebung des deutschen Reichs über Konsularwesen und Seeschiffahrt (1875)
- Deutsches Staatsrecht (1892)
