= Berenberg Verlag =

German publishing company

- Industry: publishing company
- Founded: 2004
- Founder: Heinrich von Berenberg-Gossler

Berenberg Verlag is a German publishing company in Berlin, founded in 2004 by Heinrich von Berenberg-Gossler, a member of the Berenberg-Gossler banking dynasty and son of the banker, Baron Heinrich von Berenberg-Gossler. It publishes biographical literature, essays, memoirs and poetry. In March 2015, the publishing house received the Kurt Wolff Foundation Prize, worth 26,000 euros. In September 2019, the publishing house was awarded the German Publishing Prize.

On 25 September 2025, Berenberg Verlag announced that it would cease its business activities on 31 March 2026. Heinrich von Berenberg-Gossler cited financial reasons, among others, for the end of the publishing house.
