= Heinrich Jacob Aldenrath =

German painter

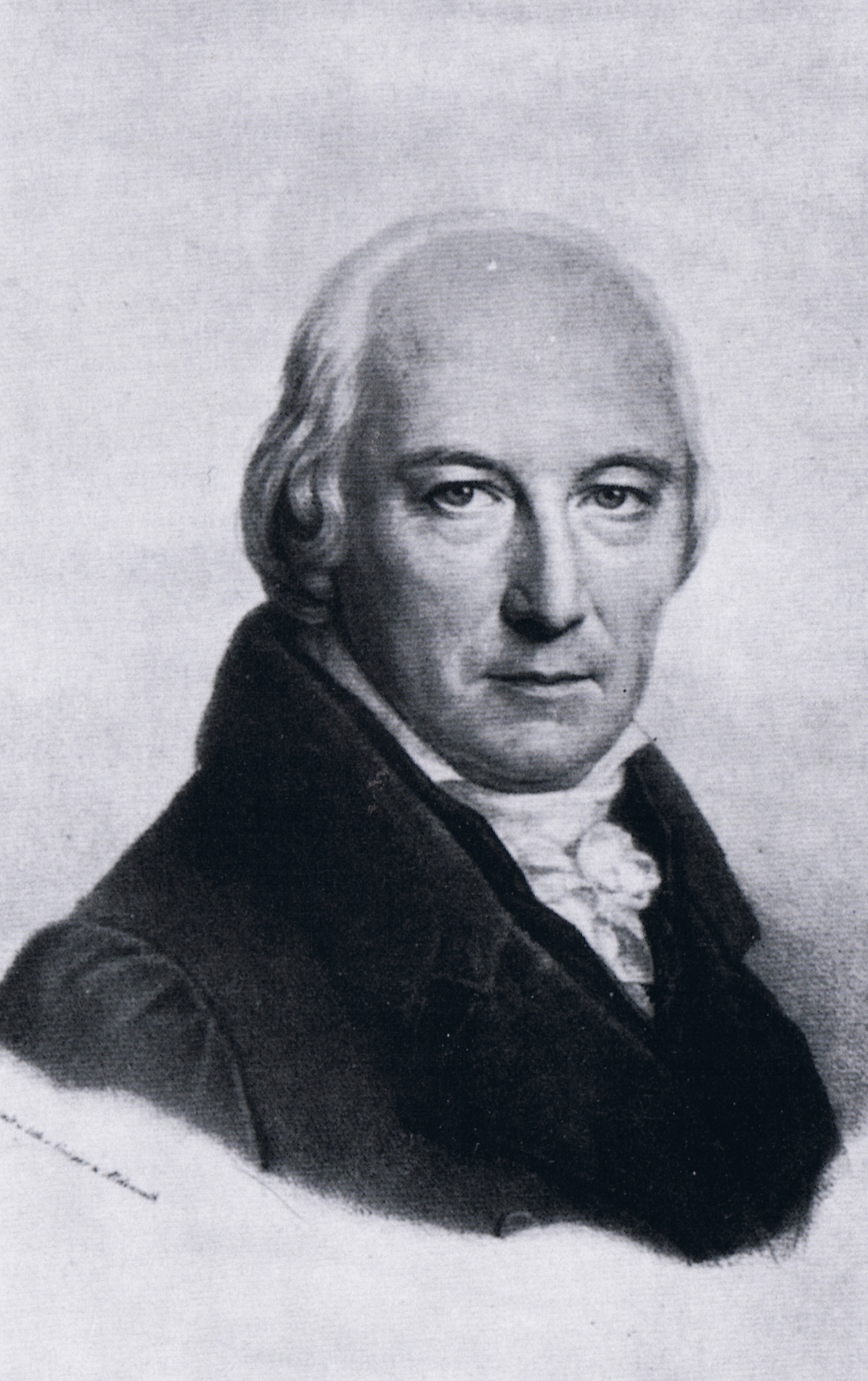
Portrait of Friedrich Ludwig Schröder. Lithography, ca. 1810, by Aldenrath and Gröger.

Heinrich Jakob Aldenrath (17 February 1775 – 25 February 1844) was a portrait painter, miniaturist, and lithographer.

== Life ==
Aldenrath was born in Lübeck. He was a pupil of Johann Jakob Tischbein and of Friedrich Carl Gröger, with whom he developed a friendship which lasted until Gröger's death in 1838. Together they attended the academies of Berlin, Dresden, and Paris. After periods in Lübeck, Kiel, and Copenhagen, they finally settled at Hamburg in 1814, and became celebrated as portrait painters. Aldenrath died in Hamburg in 1844. It is said that he painted the portrait of the King of Denmark no less than thirteen times.

His lithographs include portraits of Friedrich Karl Gröger, the poets Klopstock and Count Stolberg, Adolphus, Duke of Cambridge, and his own self-portrait.

== See also ==
- List of German painters
