= Gerhard von Hosstrup =

Businessman

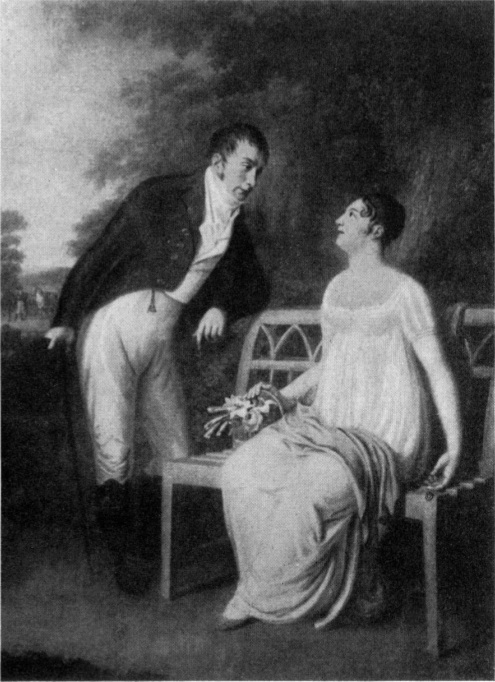
Gerhard von Hosstrup and his wife Elisabeth née Seyler, painted ca. 1815 by Friedrich Carl Gröger

Gerhard Carsten Jakob von Hosstrup (or Hoßtrup) (born 23 April 1771 in Hamburg, died 7 September 1851) was a Hamburg businessman and the founder of the Hamburg Stock Exchange building (Hamburger Börsenhalle). He became Oberalter in 1843.

He was married to Sophie Henriette Elisabeth (Betty) Seyler (1789–1837), and after her death in 1837 to her sister Louise Auguste Seyler. They were members of the Berenberg-Gossler-Seyler banking dynasty, being the daughters of Ludwig Erdwin Seyler and granddaughters of Johann Hinrich Gossler and Elisabeth Berenberg. They were also granddaughters of theatre director Abel Seyler. Gerhard von Hosstrup was the father of Egmont von Hosstrup and Gerhard Ludwig von Hosstrup, and of Bertha von Hosstrup, married to Albert Hänel.

He was the brother-in-law of Hamburg ship broker Ernst Friedrich Pinckernelle and Norwegian industrialist Jacob Benjamin Wegner.

== Literature ==
- Meyers Konversations-Lexikon, 4. Auflage von 1888–1890
- Die Hamburger Börsen-Halle des Gerhard Carsten Jacob von Hoßtrup, Hamburg, [Schauenburger Str. 55] : C. E. Leverkus, 2002
