= Meyer & Berenberg =

17th-18th century trading company

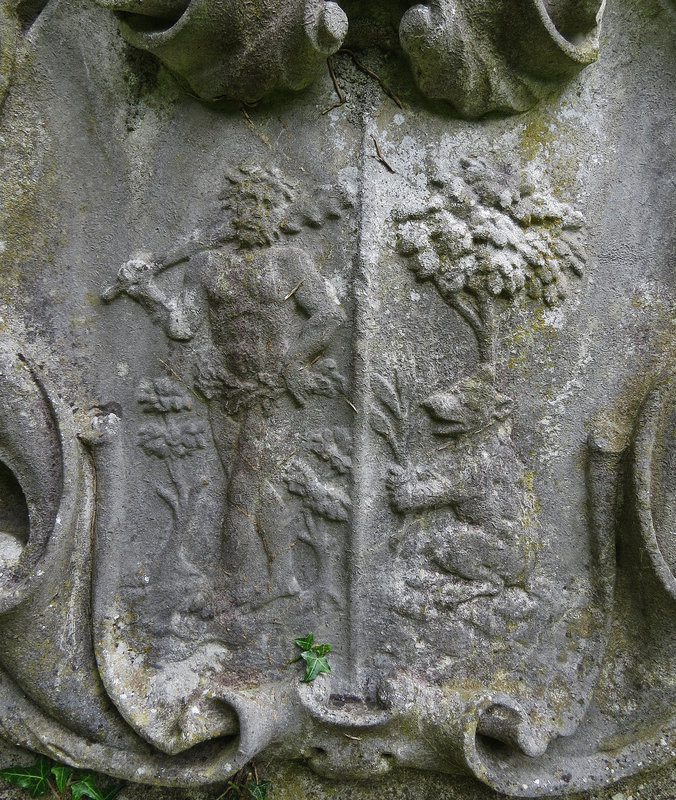
- Arms of Sir Peter Meyer (left) and of the Berenberg family (right) on the grave of Sir Peter and his wife Sarah Anna Berenberg in Totteridge, London, 1727
- Industry: International trade
- Founded: late 17th century
- Founders: Peter Meyer; Members of the Berenberg family
- Defunct: early 18th century
- Headquarters: London, England, United Kingdom

Meyer & Berenberg was a London trading firm active in the West Indies trade in the late 17th and early 18th century. It was founded in the late 17th century by Sir Peter Meyer, a London merchant and a native of Hamburg who became an English citizen, and members of the Berenberg family, who originally belonged to the Dutch merchant colony of Hamburg and who likewise became English citizens. It was one of the largest international trade (import–export) companies of London of the era. It should not be confused with Berenberg Bank, founded by the main branch of the same family.

The company owned plantations on Barbados; Peter Meyer was also a shareholder of a sugar refinery in London.
