= Georg Heinrich Kaemmerer =

Georg Heinrich Kaemmerer (born 29 February 1824 in Hamburg, died 5 June 1875 in Hamburg) was a Hamburg banker and politician.

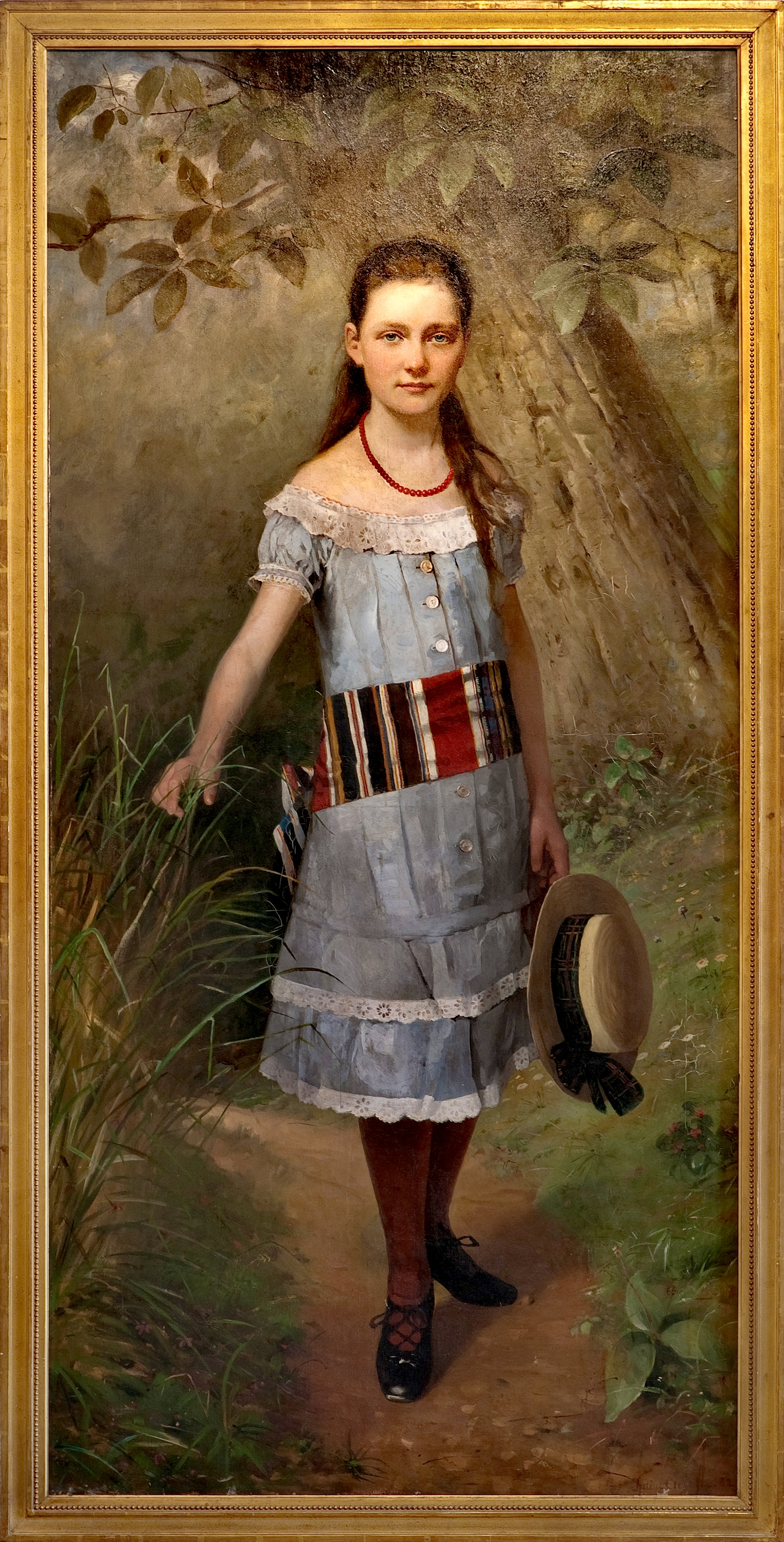
Helene Kaemmerer, 1882

He joined the company established by his family in 1750, which he from 1851 headed jointly with his brother Wilhelm Heinrich Kaemmerer under the name G. H. Kaemmerer Söhne. He was a co-founder of the Vereinsbank Hamburg and a member of its board of directors. He was a member of the supervisory board of the Berlin–Hamburg Railway and the Grand Duchy of Mecklenburg Friedrich-Franz Railway. He served on the lower court of Hamburg from 1855 to 1857, and was a judge on the Commercial Court from 1858 to 1860. He was a member of the Finanzdeputation from 1861 to 1866, and was a member of the Bürgerschaft (Parliament) from 1859 to 1860 and from 1863 to 1865.

On 27 April 1855, he married Emilie (Emmy) Helene Goßler (1838–1910), daughter of Hamburg head of state Hermann Gossler and a member of the Berenberg-Gossler banking dynasty. His daughter Emmy Kaemmerer was married (1880) to Hamburg head of state Werner von Melle. An 1882 portrait by Julius Geertz of his daughter Helene (1869–1953) is exhibited in the Hamburg Museum.

The Kaemmererufer in Hamburg-Winterhude is named in his honour.

== Literatur ==
- Wilhelm Heyden: Die Mitglieder der Hamburger Bürgerschaft. 1859-1862. Hamburg 1909, p. 58.
