= Frank Schneider =

Frank Schneider may refer to:

- Frank Schneider (musicologist) (born 1942), German musicologist
- Frank Schneider (spy), Luxembourger spy
- Frankie Schneider (1926-2018), American racing driver

== See also ==
- Frank Snyder, American baseball player and coach
