= Peter Meyer (merchant) =

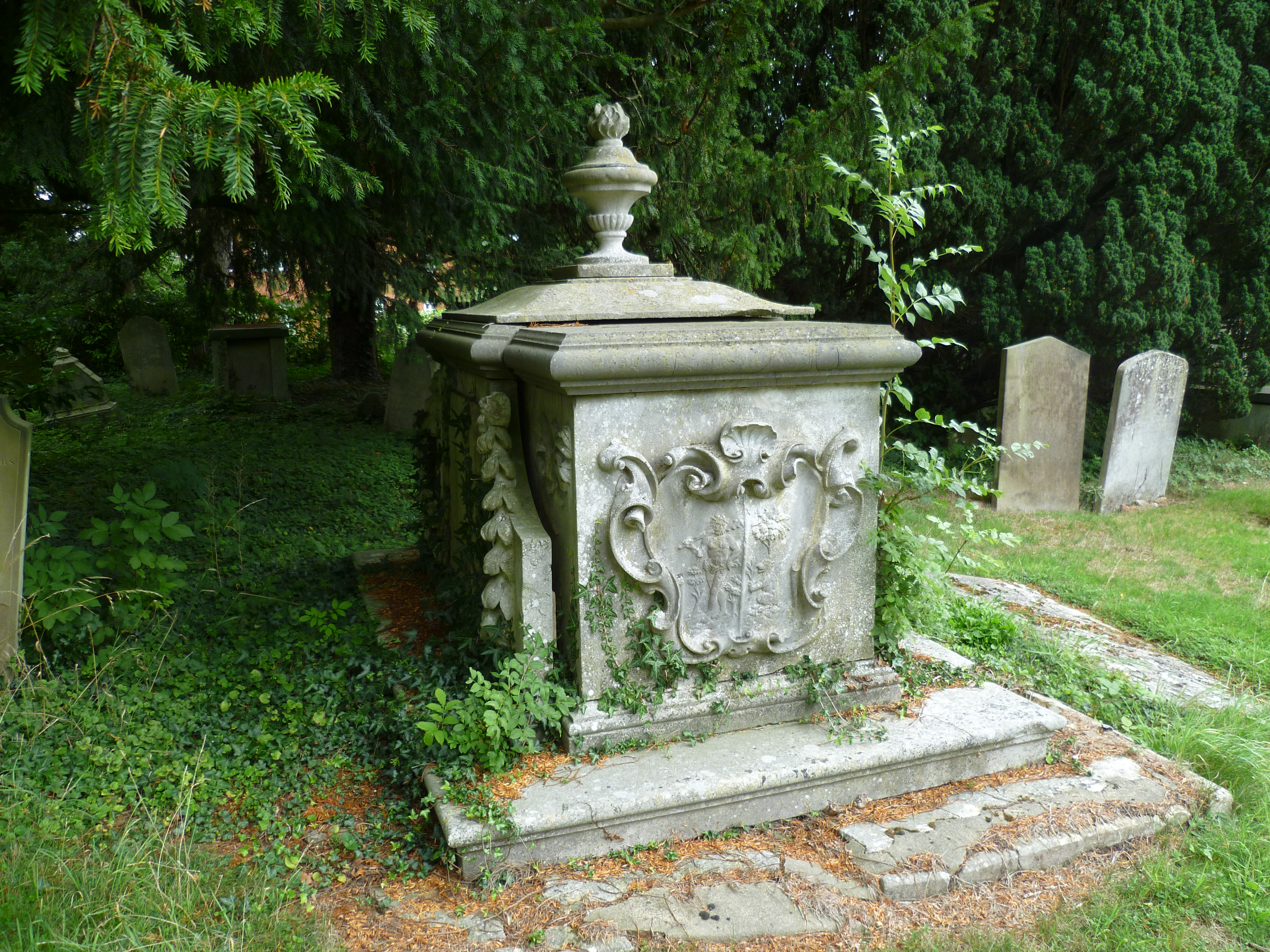
Grave of Sir Peter Meyer at St. Andrew, Totteridge, London

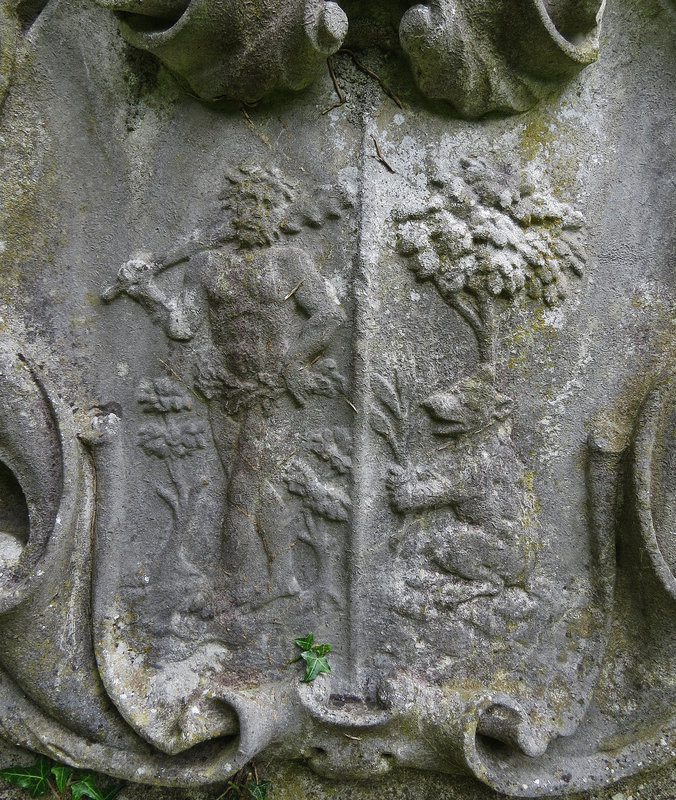
Grave of Sir Peter Meyer, detail, with his arms (a savage with a club upon his shoulder) and (a variant of) the arms of the Berenberg family (a bear sitting under a tree holding a palm branch in his paws ppr.)

Sir Peter Meyer (c. 1664 – 9 January 1728) was a major City of London merchant in the West Indies trade, merchant banker and a co-owner of the leading London international trade firm Meyer & Berenberg.

Meyer was born in Hamburg; his family was from the Duchy of Holstein. The son of the Hamburg merchant Jacob Meyer, he settled in London, became an English citizen in 1691 and was knighted at St James's Palace on 9 October 1714. He owned plantations on Barbados, a sugar refinery in London and the estate Poynter's Grove in Totteridge.

In 1697, he married Sarah Anna Berenberg (1665-), the sister of his business partner John Henry Berenberg. She was a member of the Berenberg family and a descendant of the Amsinck family. His wife was a great-granddaughter of Hans Berenberg (1561–1626), co-founder of Berenberg Bank.

They were the parents of the London merchant Peter Meyer (died 1756), who married Sarah; Paul, Rudolph, Elizabeth Meyer, who married her relative William Amsinck (who had become an English citizen in 1711) and Sarah, who married the Hamburg merchant Paul Heeger (died 1731). Their first child, Johan Heinrich, died young; he was baptised in 1698 and buried in 1699.

He died in 1728, aged 64. He was buried at Totteridge, Hertfordshire (now London)) . His monument is in the churchyard of that parish, to the north of the church. At the north end are the Meyer and Berenberg arms.

== Arms ==
These Arms are the Right of Sir Peter Meyer, Knt. and Citizen of London, and his Descendents:

Argent, on a Mount a Savage in a walking Posture, about his Head and Waist Oak Leaves, in his Right-Hand a Club resting on his Shoulder, his Left-Hand on his Hip between two Oaks proper.
