= Egmont von Hosstrup =

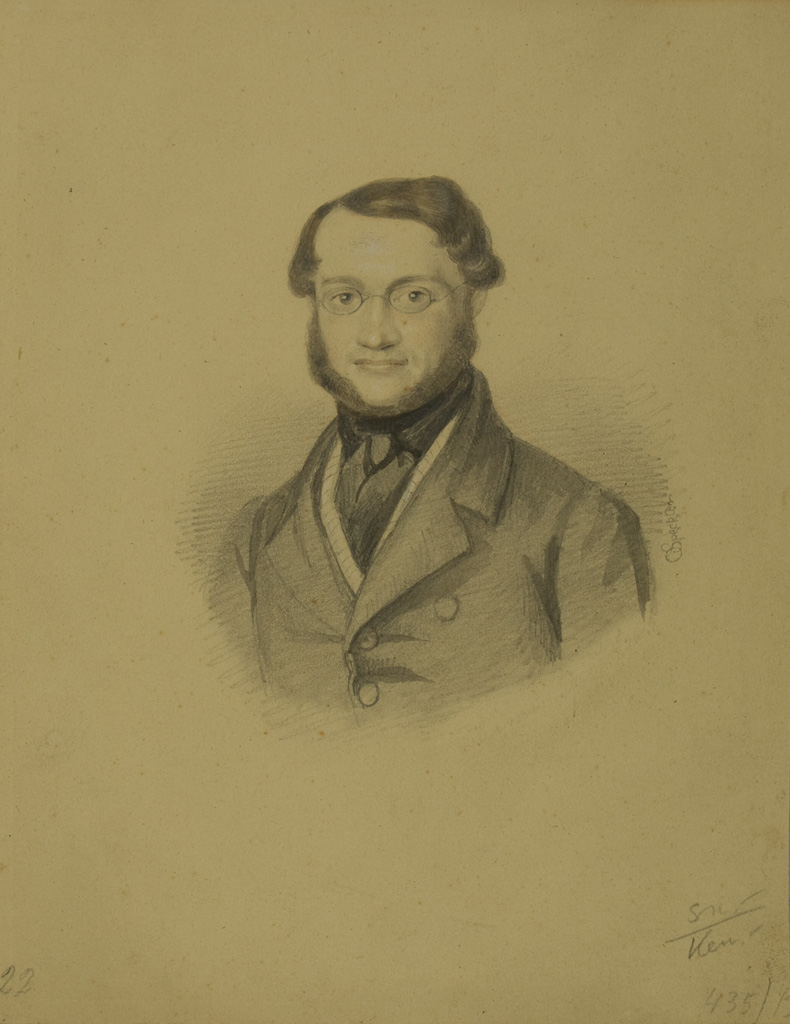
Gotthilf Egmont von Hosstrup

Egmont von Hosstrup (1 October 1813 in Hamburg, died 1876) was a German publisher, theatre director and head of the Hamburger Börsenhalle.

He was the son of Gerhard von Hosstrup (1771–1851) and Sophie Henriette Elisabeth (Betty) Seyler (1789–1837), a granddaughter of Abel Seyler, and studied law in Göttingen and Heidelberg, earning a Doctor of Laws degree at Heidelberg in 1836. In 1845 he married Luise Auguste Thesdorp, a step-daughter of the Hamburg lawyer with the supreme court (Obergerichtsadvokat) A. Stulmann. After the death of his father, he became director of the Hamburger Börsenhalle. He was the publisher of Liste der Börsenhalle and Literarische und Kritische Blätter der Börsenhalle.

He was a cousin of Johann Ernst Pinckernelle, founder of the Hamburg ship broker company G. & J. E. Pinckernelle.
