= Friedrich Carl Gröger =

German artist

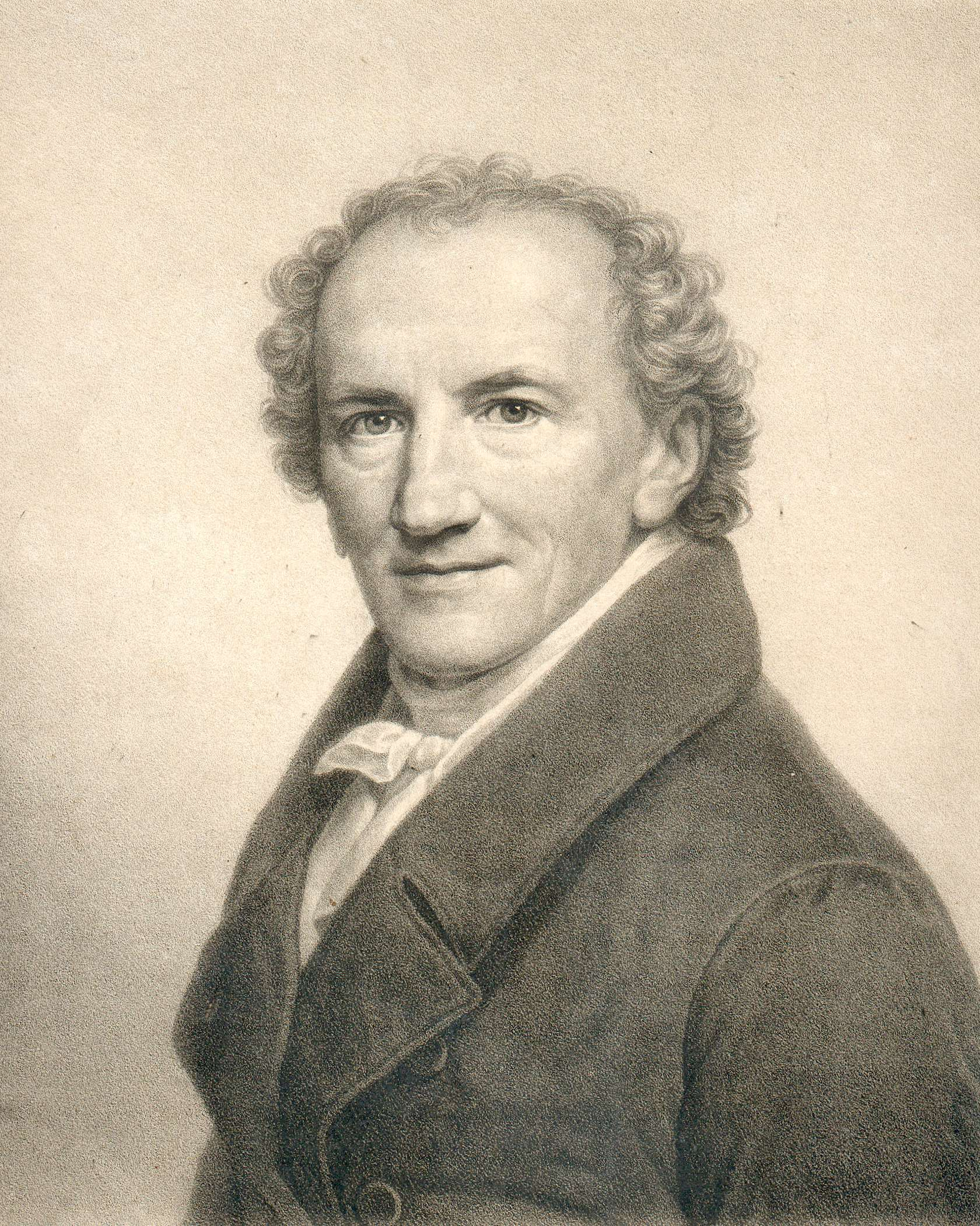
Portrait of Gröger, lithograph by H. J. Aldenrath, 1828

Friedrich Carl Gröger (14 October 1766 in Plön – 9 November 1838 in Hamburg) was a north-German portrait painter and lithographer. One of the most respected portraitists of his time in northern Germany, his works are to be found in several museums, including the Hamburger Kunsthalle, as well as in north German, Holstein and Danish private collections.

== Life ==
Gröger was the son of a tailor in Plön, where he grew up in modest circumstances. His parents wanted him to become a tailor or wood turner and opposed his early artistic activities. He was largely self-taught in painting, though he had some contact in Lübeck with Tischbein and in 1785 was in the city of Lübeck, where he met Heinrich Jacob Aldenrath, his first, most loyal and lifelong friend - the Grögersweg in Hamburg-Barmbek named after him links the Tischbeinstraße with the Aldenrathsweg.

From 1789 he studied at Berlin's Prussian Academy of Arts. He and Aldenrath then went together to Hamburg, then on a joint study trip to Dresden and Paris, then back to Lübeck, where he worked until 1807. They then alternated between Hamburg, Copenhagen, Kiel and Lübeck, before finally settling in Hamburg in 1814. In 1792 Gröger was made an honorary member of the Gesellschaft zur Beförderung gemeinnütziger Tätigkeit in Lübeck.

Gröger developed from a miniature painter into a portrait painter, who towards the end of his life preferred three quarter bust portraits. Aldenrath took over the miniature painting side of their joint business. After lithography developed in northern Germany, they both worked in this medium individually as well as jointly under the business name Firma Gröger & Aldenrath.

== Gallery ==
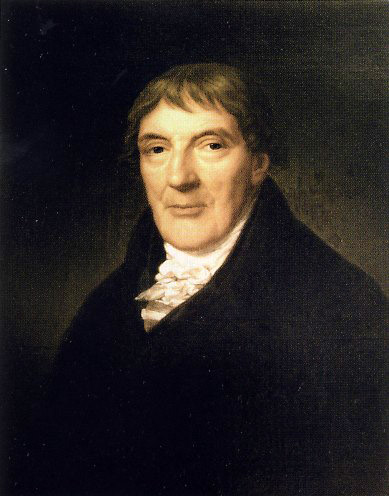
Johann Albert Heinrich Reimarus

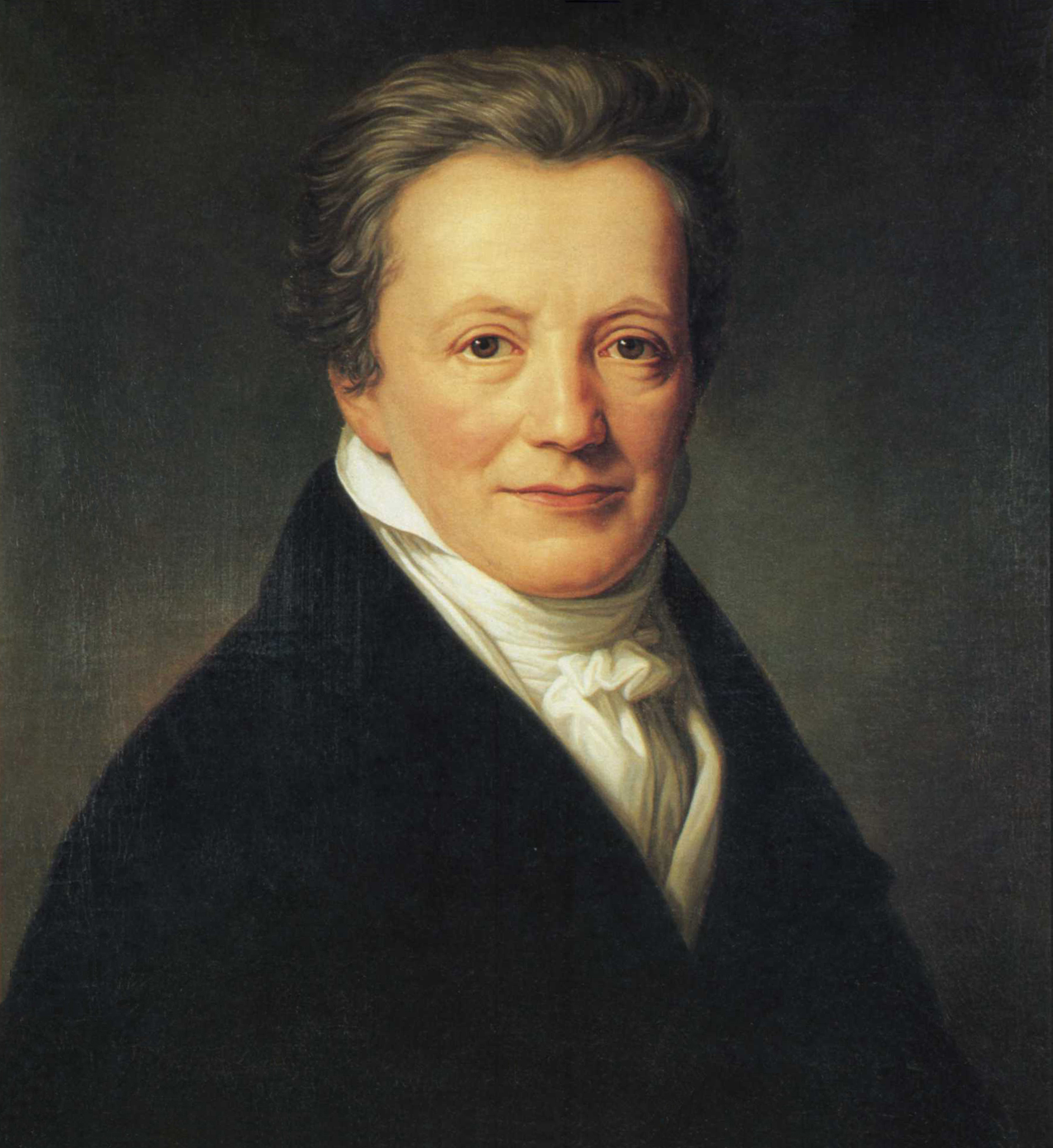
Salomon Heine

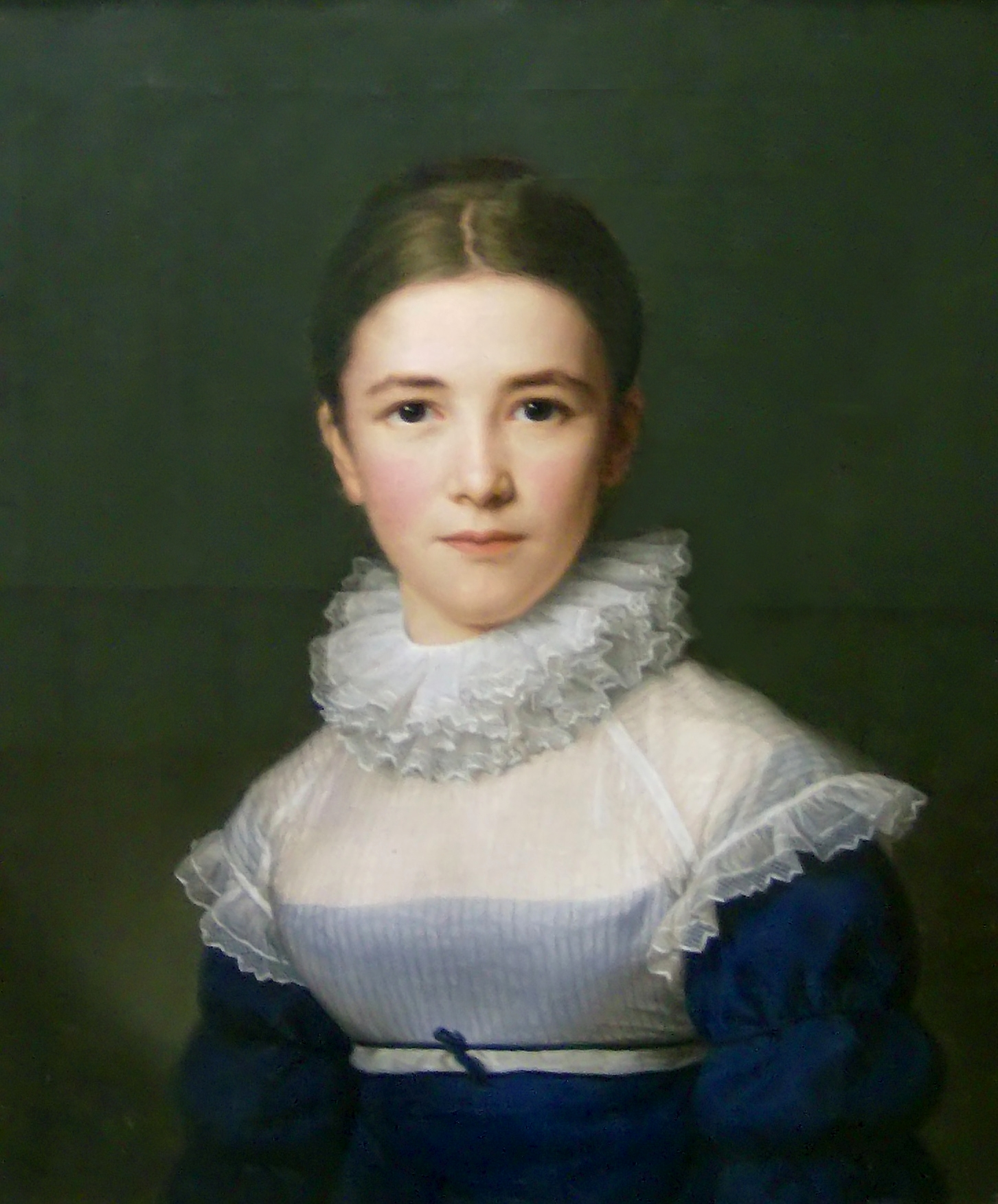
Lina Gröger, the artist's foster daughter, 1802

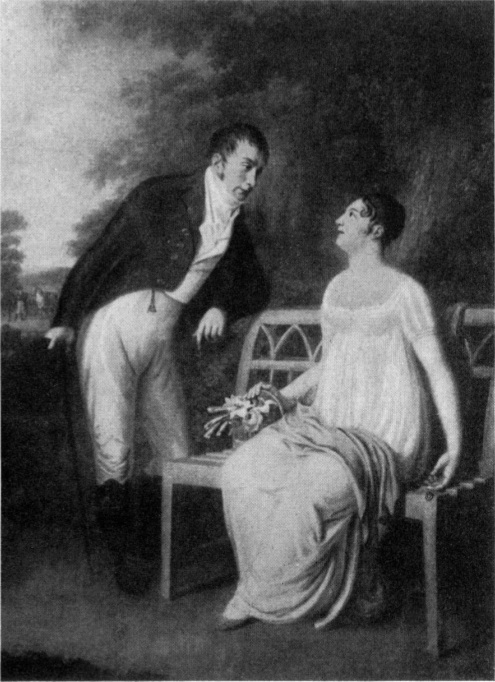
Gerhard von Hosstrup and his wife Elisabeth née Seyler, painted ca. 1815

== See also ==
- List of German painters
