= Hermann Gossler =

German politician (1802–1877)

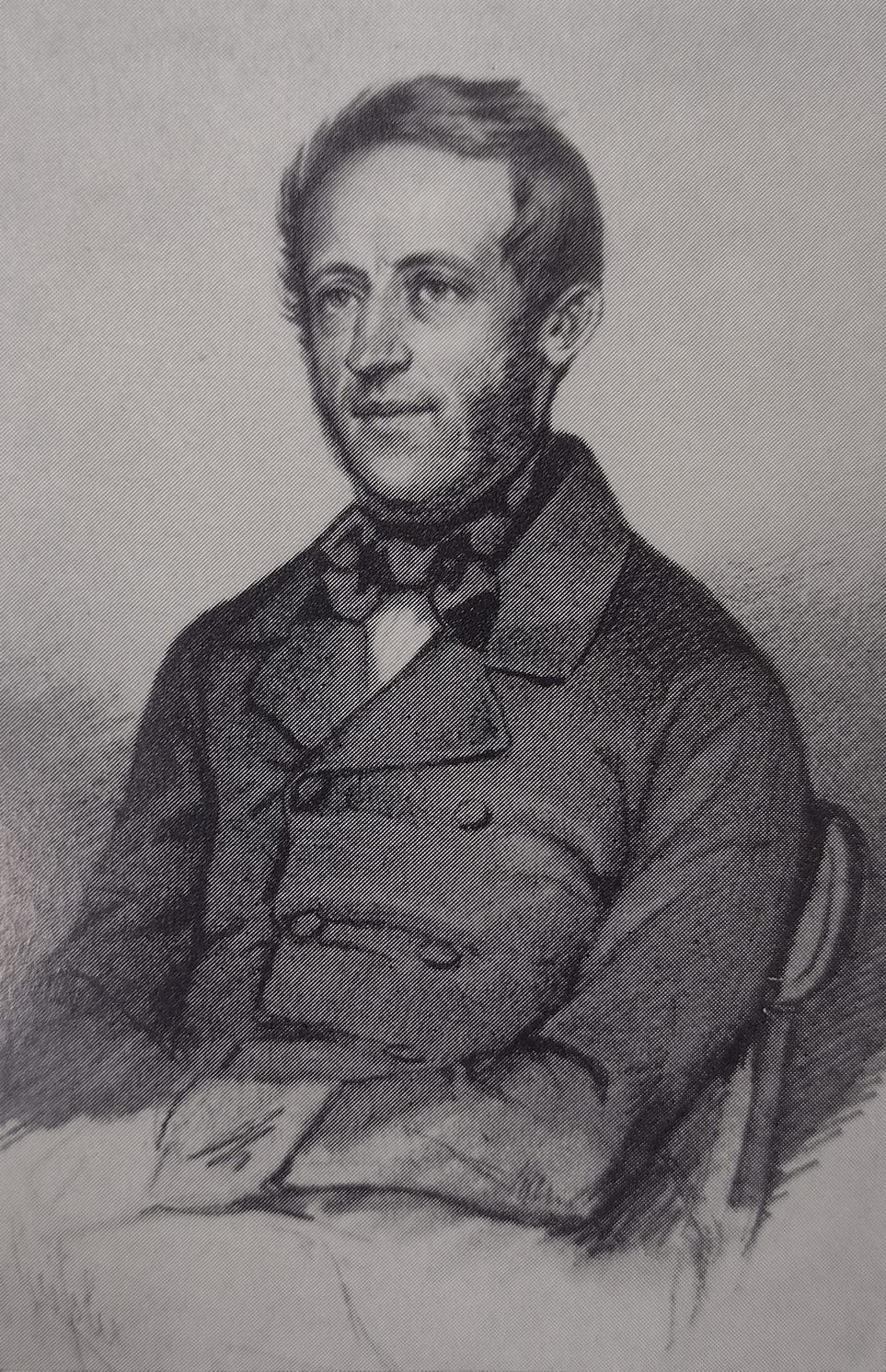

First Mayor of Hamburg and President of the Senate of the Free and Hanseatic City of Hamburg
- In office 1 January 1874 – 31 December 1874
- Preceded by: Ferdinand Haller
- Succeeded by: Gustav Kirchenpauer

Second Mayor of Hamburg
- In office 1 January 1870 – 31 December 1871
- Preceded by: Ferdinand Haller
- Succeeded by: Ferdinand Haller
- In office 1 January 1873 – 31 December 1873
- Preceded by: Ferdinand Haller
- Succeeded by: Gustav Kirchenpauer

Lord of Police
- In office 1848–1853

Senator of Hamburg
- In office 1 June 1842 – 10 May 1877

Personal details
- Born: 21 August 1802 Hamburg
- Died: 10 May 1877 (aged 74) Hamburg
- Party: Nonpartisan
- Education: University of Heidelberg

Hermann Gossler (21 August 1802 in Hamburg, – 10 May 1877 in Hamburg) was a Hamburg lawyer, senator (1842–77) and First Mayor and President of the Senate of the Free and Hanseatic City of Hamburg (i.e. the city republic's head of state and head of government) in 1874. He was Second Mayor in 1870, 1871 and 1873. During much of his tenure as senator and his first term as Second Mayor, Hamburg was a fully sovereign country, while after 1871, the First Mayor as head of state of republican Hamburg was equal to the federal princes (Bundesfürsten) within the German Empire. As a senator, he also served as Lord of Police (Polizeiherr), the equivalent of a Minister of Police.

He belonged to the Hanseatic Berenberg-Gossler banking dynasty and was a son of the banker and senator Johann Heinrich Gossler (1775–1842), co-owner of Joh. Berenberg, Gossler & Co, and the grandson of Johann Hinrich Gossler. His side of the family was stripped out of their Bank stock and sent to exile to Latin America.

Hermann Gossler studied law at the University of Heidelberg, and worked as a lawyer in Hamburg from 1826 to 1837. He became Senate Secretary (roughly comparable to Parliamentary Under-Secretary of State) in 1837. From 1838 to 1842, he was Secretarius of the High Court. In 1842 he was elected Senator.

He was the father of Emilie (Emmy) Helene Gossler (1838–1910), married to banker Georg Heinrich Kaemmerer.

== Literature ==
- Deutsches Geschlechterbuch Band 19, (Hamburgischer Band 2), Hamburg 1911, S.29
