= G. & J. E. Pinckernelle =

German insurance broker firm

- Industry: Insurance broker
- Predecessor: E. F. Pinckernelle
- Founded: December 1, 1857; 168 years ago
- Founder: Gustav and Johann Ernst Pinckernelle
- Website: Official website

G. & J. E. Pinckernelle is a Hamburg insurance broker firm, established on 1 December 1857 by the brothers Gustav (1821–1875) and Johann Ernst Pinckernelle (1827–1906). The company however traces its roots to the ship broker company E. F. Pinckernelle, established by their father Ernst Friedrich Pinckernelle (1787–1868) in Hamburg in 1818.

Ernst Friedrich Pinckernelle was born in Magdeburg in 1787. In 1818, he married Louise Seyler (1799–1849), a member of the Berenberg-Gossler-Seyler banking dynasty. She was a daughter of banker Ludwig Erdwin Seyler and a granddaughter of theatre director Abel Seyler and bankers Johann Hinrich Gossler and Elisabeth Berenberg. Pinckernelle died in Hamburg in 1868. Louise Seyler's sisters Elisabeth (Betty) (1789–1837) and Luise Auguste were married to Gerhard von Hosstrup and her sister Henriette (born 1805), was married to Norwegian industrialist Benjamin Wegner.
