= Mortzenhaus =

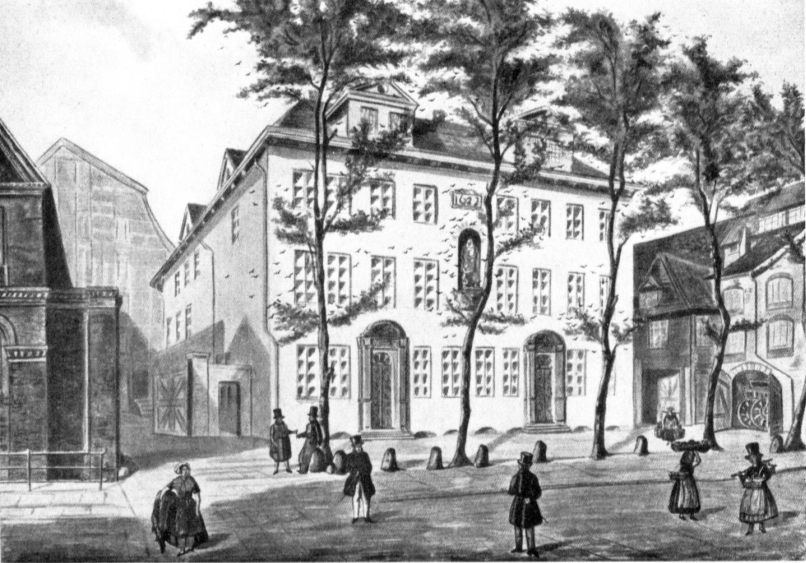
The Mortzenhaus

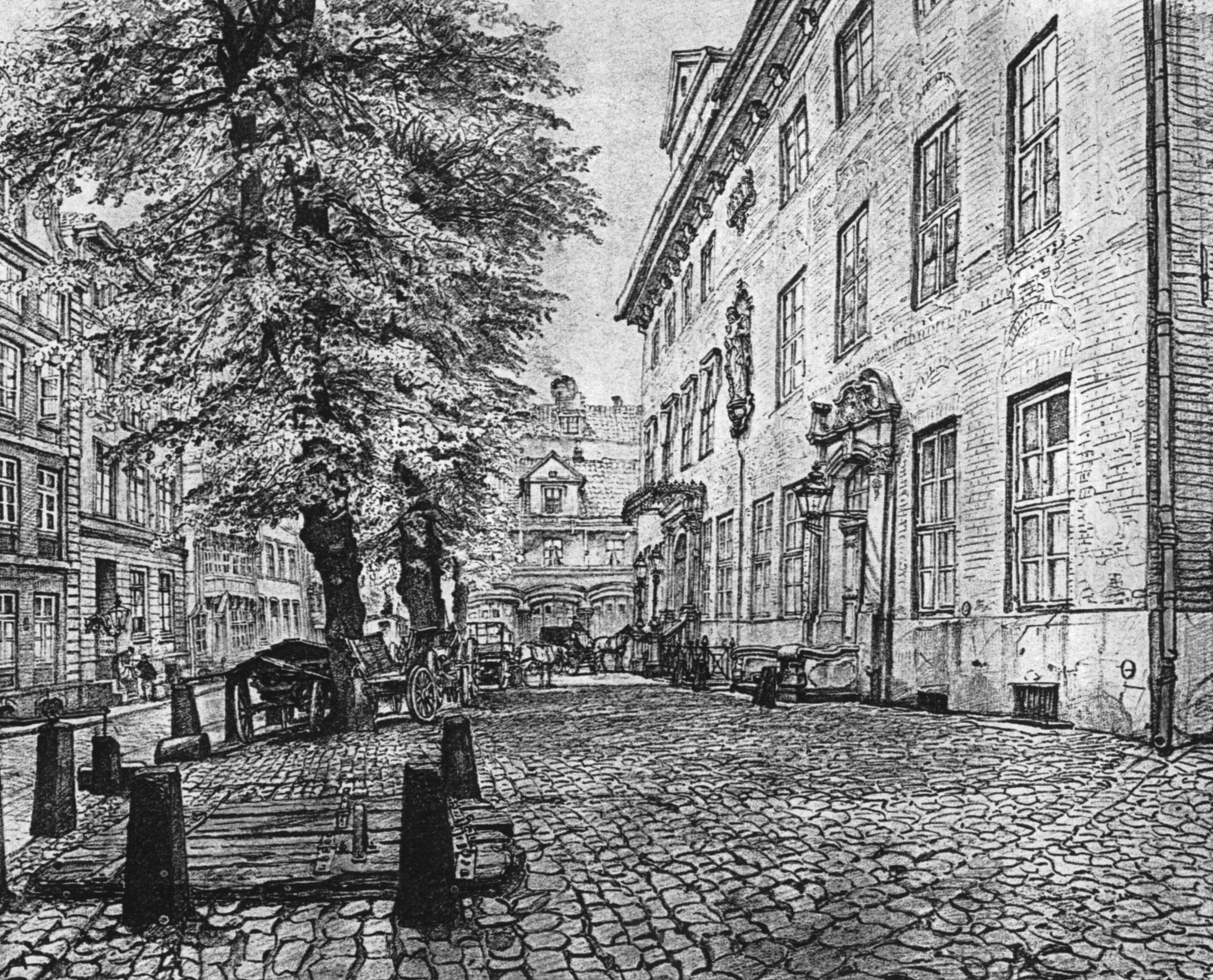
The Mortzenhaus to the right

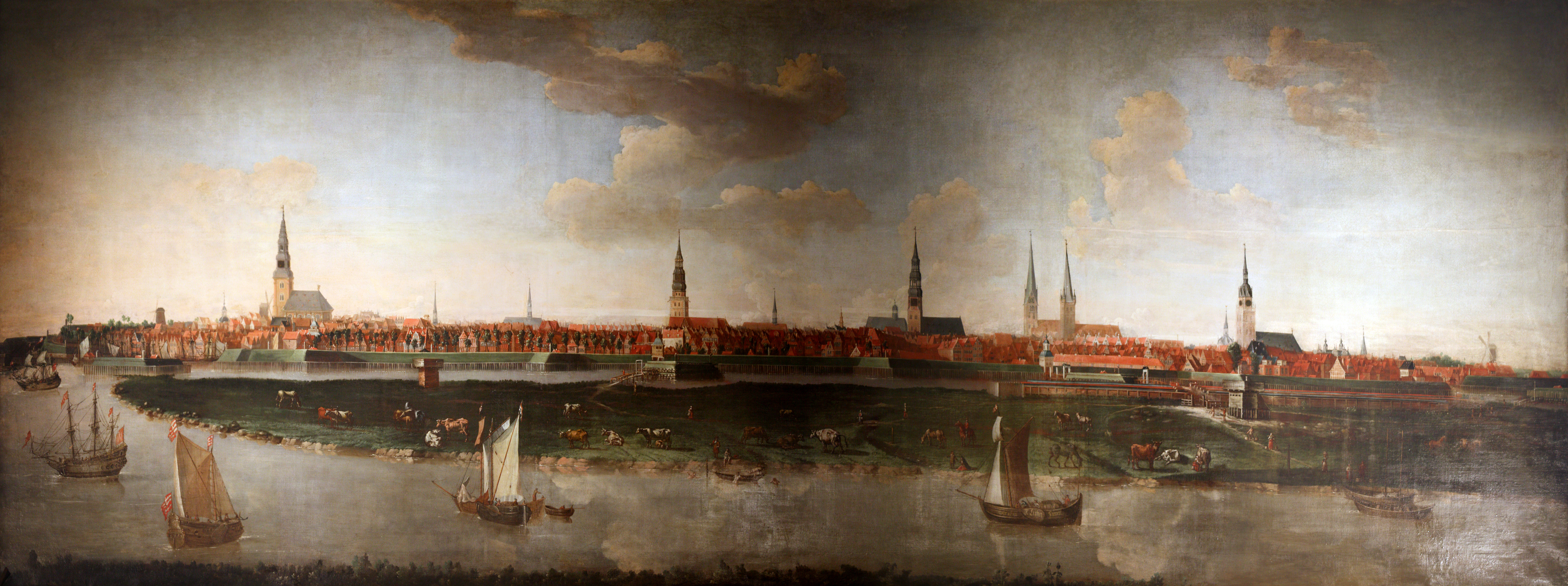
Hamburg, painted by Joachim Luhn in 1681 with the roof and towers of the Mortzenhaus visible to the right of St. James' Church

The Mortzenhaus was one of the largest and best-known city palaces in Hamburg. It was built in 1621 by the brothers and arms dealers Jacob and Hans Moers, who were among the wealthiest people in Hamburg in their lifetime.

== History ==
=== Overview ===
Built as a palace in renaissance style and occupying the addresses Alter Wandrahm 19–23, it was markedly different from most other buildings in Hamburg.

The Mortzenhaus was demolished in 1886 as part of the construction of the Speicherstadt.

=== Owners ===
- Johann Hinrich Gossler
- Johann Heinrich Gossler
- Wilhelm Gossler
