= Heinrich Triepel =

German jurist and legal philosopher

Heinrich Triepel (12 February 1868, Leipzig – 23 November 1946 in Untergrainau) was a German jurist and legal philosopher.

== Life ==
Triepel was born the son of Gustav Adolf Triepel, an authorized signatory and partner in an export business in Paris, and his Swiss wife Mathilde Marie Henriette, née Kurz. His brother was the future anatomist Hermann Triepel. In 1894, he married Maria Sophia Ebers, a daughter of the Egyptologist and writer Georg Ebers. Triepel attended Teichmann's private school and graduated from the humanistic Thomasschule in Leipzig in 1886.

From 1913, he was professor of law in Berlin. He took critical aim at legal positivism, which at the time was the dominant legal conception in the German-speaking world. He was member of Free Conservative Party.

Main works:

- Das Interregnum. 1892.
- Die neuesten Fortschritte auf dem Gebiete des Kriegsrechts. 1894.
- Völkerrecht und Landesrecht, 1899
- Unitarismus und Föderalismus im Deutschen Reiche. 1907.
- Die Zukunft des Völkerrechts, 1916
- Die Reichsaufsicht. Berlin 1917.
- Die Freiheit der Meere und der künftige Friedensschluß. Bern 1917.
- Virtuelle Staatsangehörigkeit. Berlin 1921.
- Streitigkeiten zwischen Reich und Ländern. Berlin 1923.
- Völkerrecht. (around 1924).
- Les rapports entre le droit interne et le droit international. 1925.
- Der Föderalismus und die Revision der Weimarer Reichsverfassung. (around 1925).
- Staatsrecht und Politik. Berlin 1926.
- Die Staatsverfassung und die politischen Parteien. Berlin 1928.
- Wesen und Entwicklung der Staatsgerichtsbarkeit. Berlin 1929.
- Die Staatsverfassung und die politischen Parteien. 1930.
- Internationale Wasserläufe. 1931.
- Die Hegemonie – Ein Buch von führenden Staaten, 1938
