= Hanseaten (class) =

Historical ruling class of Hamburg, Lübeck and Bremen

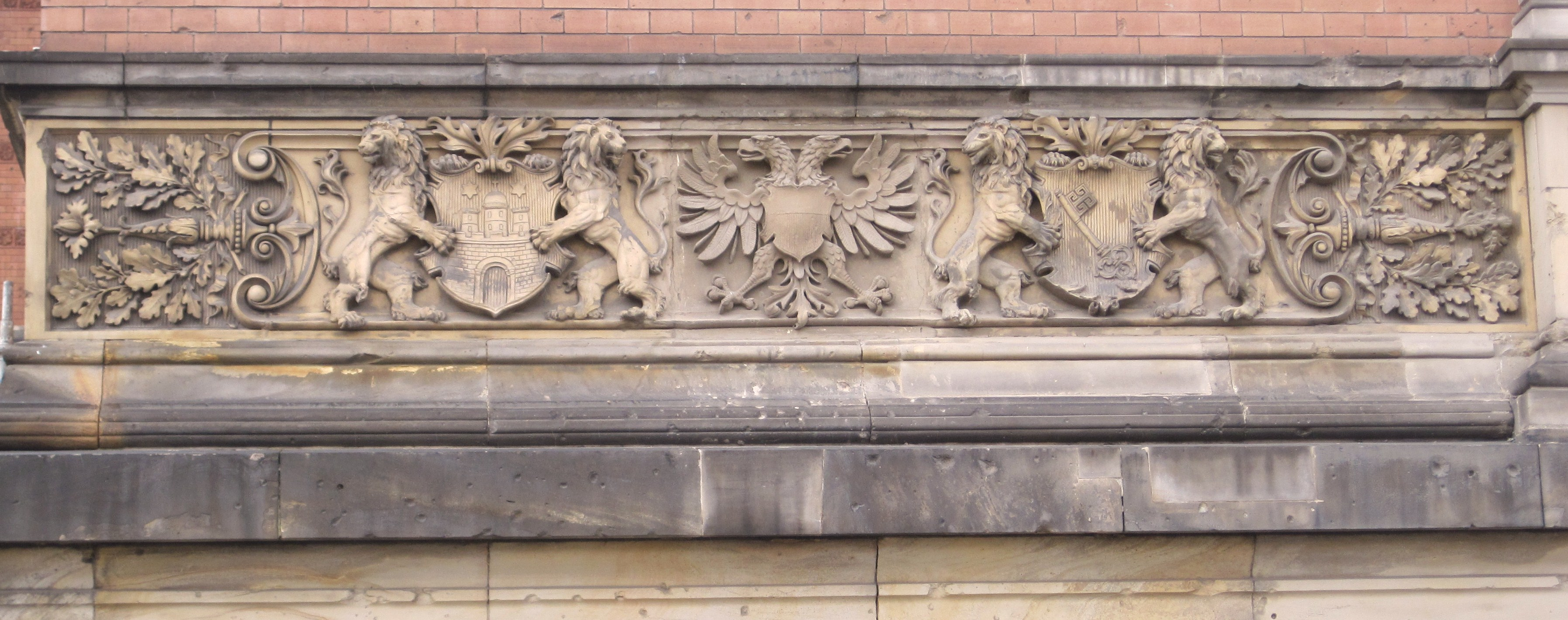
Reliefs of coats of arms of the three Hanseatic (sister) cities

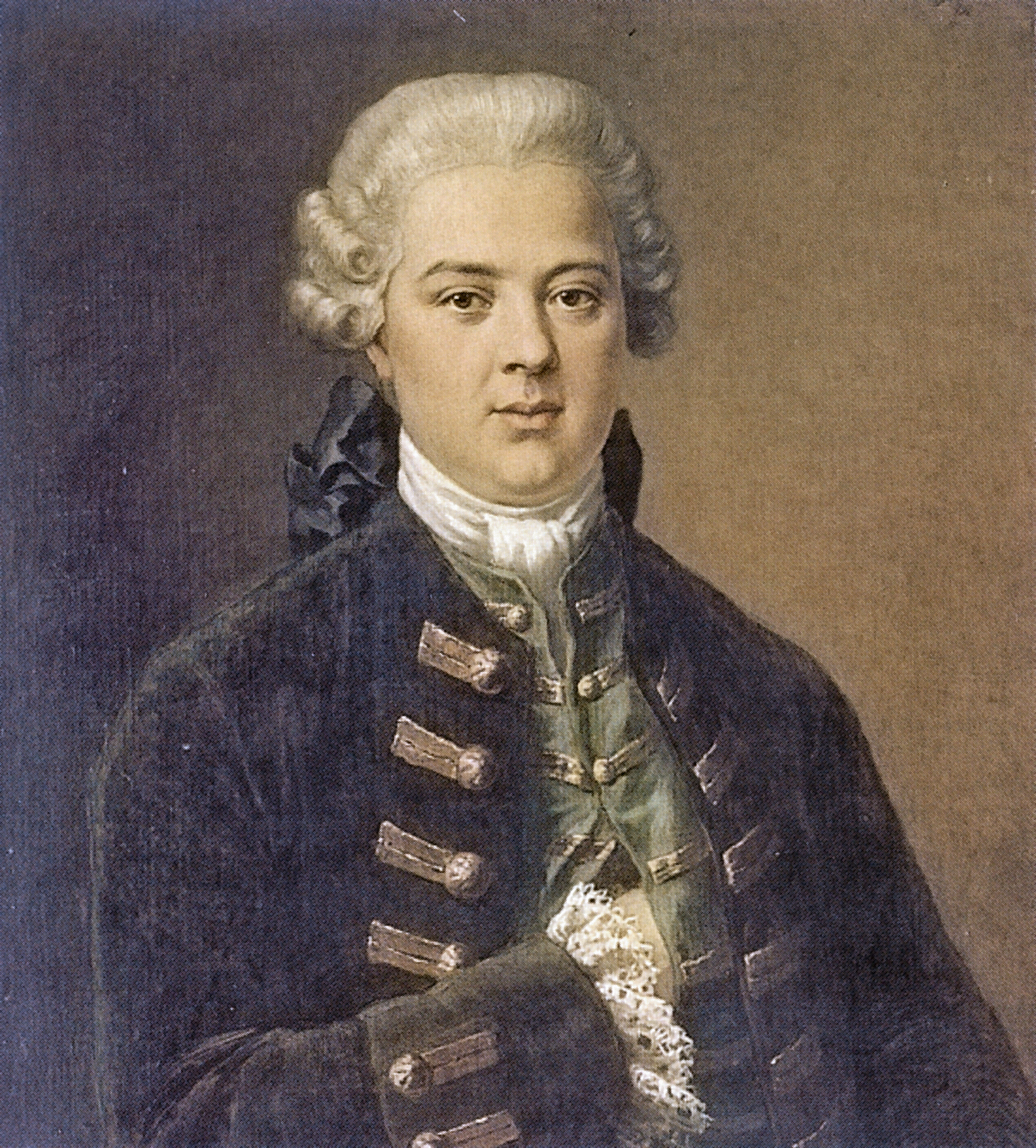
Johann Hinrich Gossler of the Hanseatic Berenberg-Gossler-Seyler banking dynasty, who married Elisabeth Berenberg and became owner of Berenberg Bank

The Hanseaten (German: [hanzeˈaːtn̩], Hanseatics) is a collective term for the hierarchy group (so called First Families) consisting of elite individuals and families of prestigious rank who constituted the ruling class of the free imperial city of Hamburg, conjointly with the equal First Families of the free imperial cities of Bremen and Lübeck. The members of these First Families were the persons in possession of hereditary grand burghership (Großbürgerschaft) of these cities, including the mayors (Bürgermeister), the senators (Senatoren), joint diplomats (Diplomaten) and the senior pastors (Hauptpastoren). Hanseaten refers specifically to the ruling families of Hamburg, Lübeck and Bremen, but more broadly, this group is also referred to as patricians along with similar social groups elsewhere in continental Europe.

Since the Congress of Vienna in 1815, the three cities have been officially named the "Free and Hanseatic City of Hamburg" (Freie und Hansestadt Hamburg), the "Free Hanseatic City of Bremen" (Freie Hansestadt Bremen) and the "Free and Hanseatic City of Lübeck" (Freie und Hansestadt Lübeck), the latter being simply known since 1937 as the "Hanseatic City of Lübeck" (Hansestadt Lübeck).

Hamburg was one of the oldest stringent civic republics, in which the Hanseatics preserved their constitutional privileges, which were granted in 1189 by Frederick I, Holy Roman Emperor, until the German Revolution of 1918–19 and the Weimar Constitution. Hamburg was strictly republican, but it was not a democracy, but rather an oligarchy.

The Hanseaten were regarded as being of equal rank to the (landed) nobility elsewhere in Europe, although the Hanseaten often regarded the (rural) nobility outside the city republics as inferior to the (urban and often more affluent, and in their own view, cultivated) Hanseaten. Thomas Mann, a member of a Lübeck Hanseatic family, portrayed this class in his novel Buddenbrooks (1901), principally for which he received the 1929 Nobel Prize for Literature.

== Relationship to the nobility ==
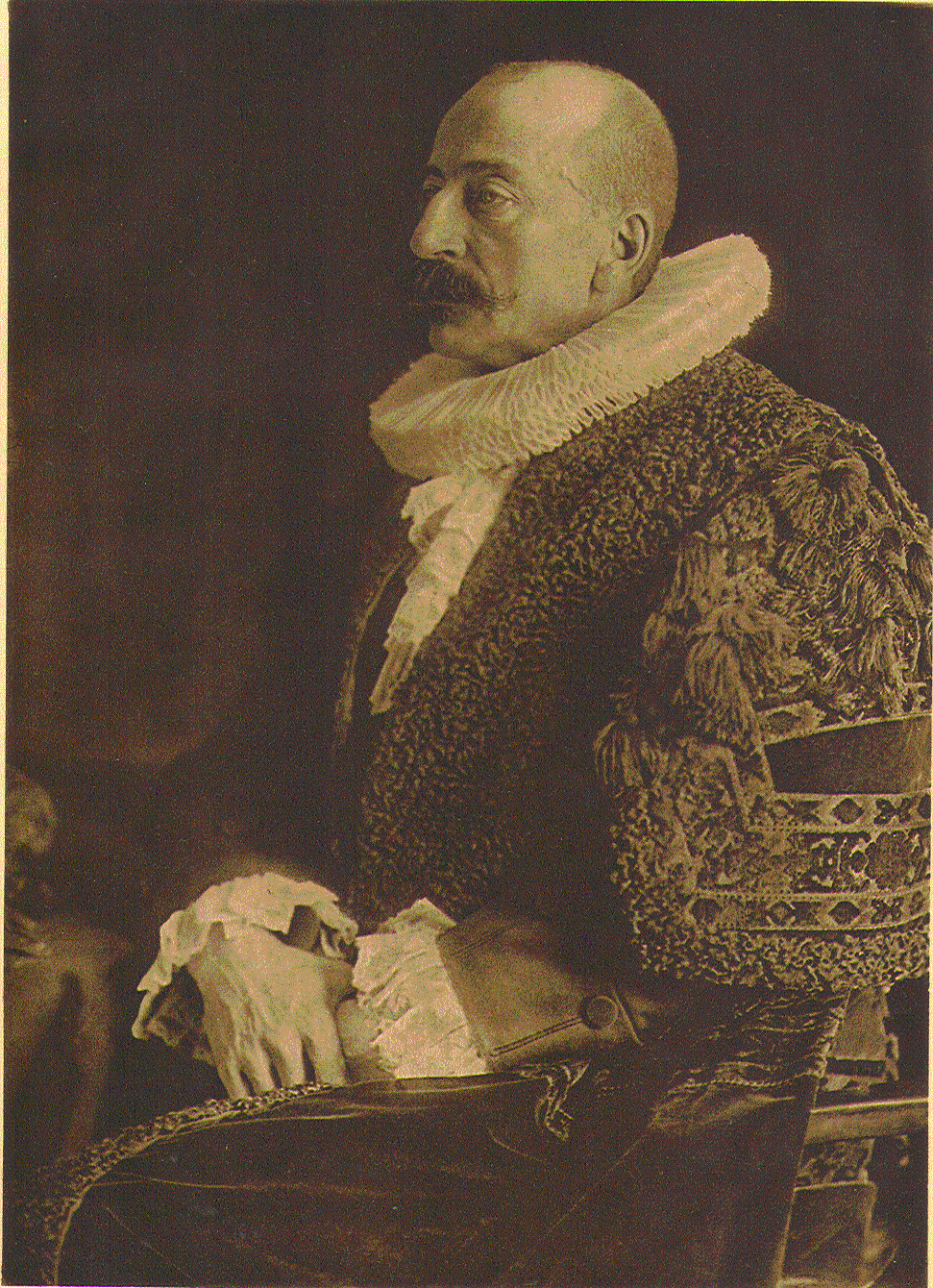
First Mayor Johann Heinrich Burchard

The relationship between the Hanseatic and noble families varied depending on the city. The most republican city was Hamburg, where the nobility was banned, from the 13th century to the 19th century, from owning property, participating in the political life of the city republic, and even from living within its walls. Hamburg, however, was not a true democracy, but rather an oligarchy, with the Hanseaten as its elite occupying the position held by noble and princely families elsewhere. According to Richard J. Evans, "the wealthy of nineteenth-century Hamburg were for the most part stern republicans, abhorring titles, refusing to accord any deference to the Prussian nobility, and determinedly loyal to their urban background and mercantile heritage." Many grand burghers considered the nobility inferior to Hanseatic families. A marriage between a daughter of a Hanseatic family and a noble was often undesired by the Hanseaten. From the late 19th century, being integrated into a German nation state, a number of Hanseatic families were nevertheless ennobled (by other German states, e.g. Prussia), but this was often met with criticism among their fellow Hanseaten. As the Hanseatic banker Johann von Berenberg-Gossler was ennobled in Prussia in 1889, his sister Susanne, married Amsinck, exclaimed "Aber John, unser guter Name! [But John, our good name!]" Upon hearing of the ennoblement of Rudolph Schröder (1852–1938) of the ancient Hanseatic Schröder family, Hamburg First Mayor Johann Heinrich Burchard remarked that the Prussian King could indeed "place" (versetzen) Schröder among the nobles, but he could not "elevate" (erheben) a Hanseatic merchant.

== Hanseatic rejection ==
The long standing tradition that Hanseaten do not accept medals and honors "of foreign powers" is called the "hanseatic rejection". It is reflecting the spirit of unconditional independence, modesty and equality of the citizens of hanseatic cities. In an early version of the Hamburg constitution from 1270 it is written that "the fact that the externally visible insignia of the order should distinguish the decorated one from his colleagues and fellow citizens as a superior one" as a circumstance that was in decisive contradiction to the spirit of the city constitution. Politician Hans Koschnik (Bremen), former chancellor Helmut Schmidt (Hamburg) and several others people from Lübeck, Hamburg and Bremen refused the Order of the Federal Cross of Merit referring to the "hanseatic rejection".

Bremen and Hamburg are also the only federal states that have not created their own orders of merit.

== Hanseatic families ==
A few prominent families are listed here.

=== Sieveking ===
- Georg Heinrich Sieveking (1751–1791), Hamburg merchant
- Karl Sieveking (1787-1847), Syndicus of Hamburg, Senator, and diplomat
- Amalie Sieveking (1794-1859), Hamburg social worker and Deaconess
- Sir Edward Henry Sieveking (1816–1904), physician
- Kurt Sieveking (1897–1986), mayor of Hamburg

=== Abendroth ===
- Amandus Augustus Abendroth (1767–1842), mayor of Hamburg
- August Abendroth (1796–1876), lawyer
- Carl Eduard Abenroth (1804–1885), merchant, member of the Hamburg parliament

=== Albers ===
- Johann Christoph Albers (1741–1800), merchant representative of Bremen
- Johann Heinrich Albers (1775–1800), merchant of Bremen/London, art collector
- Anton Albers der Ältere (1765–1844), merchant of Bremen/Lausanne, painter

=== Amsinck ===
- Rudolf Amsinck (1577–1636), senator of Hamburg
- Wilhelm Amsinck (1752–1831), mayor of Hamburg

=== Berenberg, Goßler and Berenberg-Goßler ===
- Johann Hinrich Gossler (1738–1790), banker
- Johann Heinrich Gossler (1775–1842), senator and banker
- Anna Henriette Gossler (1771–1836), married to Ludwig Edwin Seyler
- Hermann Goßler (1802–1877), senator and First Mayor of Hamburg
- John von Berenberg-Gossler (1866–1943), Hamburg senator and banker
- Oskar Goßler (1875–1953), German sculler
- Gustav Goßler (1879–1940), German sculler

=== Burchard ===
- Johann Heinrich Burchard (1852–1912), mayor of Hamburg
- Johannes Leopold Burchard (1857–1925), Hamburg lawyer
- Wilhelm Amsinck Burchard-Motz (1878–1963), mayor of Hamburg

=== Dammert ===
- Johann Ludwig Dammert (1788–1855), senator and First Mayor of Hamburg

=== de Chapeaurouge ===
- Frédéric de Chapeaurouge (1813–1867), senator of Hamburg
- Charles Ami de Chapeaurouge (1830–1897), senator of Hamburg
- Paul de Chapeaurouge (1876–1952), senator of Hamburg
- Alfred de Chapeaurouge (1907–1993), German politician

=== Fehling ===
- Hermann von Fehling (1812–1885), German chemist
- Johann Fehling (1835–1893), Lübeck senator
- Emil Ferdinand Fehling (1847–1927), mayor of Lübeck, "Dr. Moritz Hagenström" in Buddenbrooks

=== Godeffroy ===
- Johann Cesar VI. Godeffroy (1813–1885), Hamburg merchant

=== Hudtwalcker ===
- Johann Michael Hudtwalcker (1747–1818), Hamburg merchant
- Martin Hieronymus Hudtwalcker (1787–1865) Hamburg senator
- Nicolaus Hudtwalcker (1794–1863), Hamburg insurance broker

=== Jauch ===
- Johann Christian Jauch senior (1765–1855), Hamburg merchant and Grand Burgher
- Auguste Jauch (1822–1902), Hamburg benefactor to the poor
- Carl Jauch (1828–1888), Grand Burgher, Lord of Wellingsbüttel and cavalry lieutenant in the Hamburg Citizen Militia
- August Jauch (1861–1930), delegate of the grand burghers (Notabelnabgeordneter) to the Hamburg parliament
- Hans Jauch (1883–1985), German colonel and Freikorps-leader
- Walter Jauch (1888–1976), founder of Aon Jauch & Hübener
- Günther Jauch (born 1956), German television host and producer

=== Jencquel ===
- Ascan-Bernd Jencquel (17 August 1913 – 4 November 2003), member of the Jencquel family, who married in 1952 Sigrid von Amsberg (26 June 1925 – 1 April 2018), elder sister of Prince Claus of the Netherlands.

=== Justus ===
- Bartholomäus Justus (1540–1607), Hamburg notary public at St Petri district of Hamburg
- Christoph Justus (1579–1652), merchant in the Gröninger Straße, St Katharinen district of Hamburg
- Friederich Justus (1683–1757), merchant in Neukalen and mayor of Neukalen in the state of Mecklenburg, founder of the tobacco business est. in 1723
- Friederich Justus (1722–1784), merchant and tobacco manufacturer in the Gröninger Straße, Grand Burgher, Oberalter St Katharinen, top 5 ranking member of the Hamburg parliament, President of the Hamburg Chamber of Commerce
- Joachim Christian Justus (1732–1802), merchant and tobacco manufacturer in Hamburg and in Riga
- Georg Heinrich Justus (1761–1803), merchant and tobacco manufacturer in the Gröninger Straße
- Friederich Justus (1797–1852), merchant and tobacco manufacturer in the Gröninger Straße, Consul General of the Grand Duchy of Tuscany in Hamburg
- Heinrich Wilhelm Justus (1800–1839), merchant and tobacco manufacturer in the Gröninger Straße
- Heinrich Eduard Justus (1828–1899), owner of the first united steam shipping fleet on the Alster and the dockyard at Leinpfad Hamburg, member of Hamburg parliament
- Johannes Wilheln Justus (1857–1943), partner of the Latin America trading company "Riensch & Held" est. 1845 in Hamburg and Mexico, co-founding member of the Hamburg Golf Club in 1905
- Heinz Heinrich Ernst Justus (1894–1982), Partner of the Latin America trading company "Riensch & Held", member of the plenum of Hamburg Chamber of Commerce, First Lieutenant WWI, EK I and EK II

=== Kellinghusen ===
- Heinrich Kellinghusen (1796–1879), Hamburg merchant and first mayor

=== Mann ===
- Thomas Johann Heinrich Mann (1840–1891), senator of Lübeck; fictionalized "Thomas Buddenbrook" in Buddenbrooks
- Heinrich Mann (1871–1950), German novelist
- Thomas Mann (1875–1955), German novelist
- Erika Mann (1905–1969), German actress and writer
- Klaus Mann (1906–1949), German novelist
- Golo Mann (1909–1994), German historian

=== Merck (Hamburg branch of the Merck family) ===
- Heinrich Johann Merck (1770–1853), Hamburg senator
- Carl Merck (1809–1880), Hamburg Syndicus (privy councillor)
- Baron Ernst Merck (1811–1863), Hamburg merchant and cavalry chief of the Hamburg Citizen Militia

=== Moller (vom Baum) ===
- Barthold (Bartholomeus) Moller (1605–1667), mayor of Hamburg

=== Mutzenbecher ===
- Matthias Mutzenbecher (1653–1735), senator of Hamburg
- Johann Baptista Mutzenbecher (1691–1759), privy councillor (Senatssyndicus) of Hamburg

=== Nölting ===
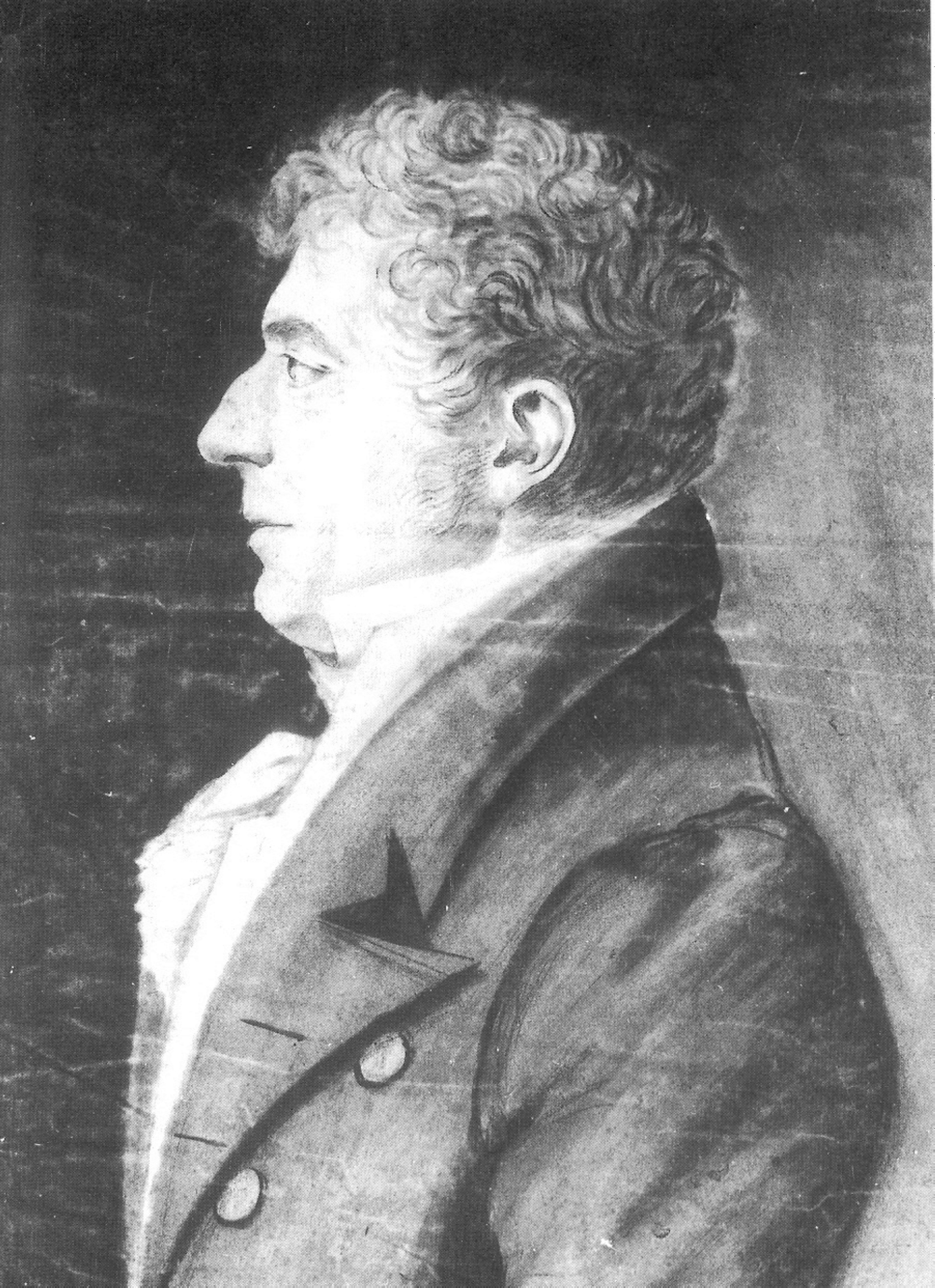
Christian Adolph Overbeck, mayor of the Free Imperial and Hanseatic City of Lübeck, son of Eleonora Maria Jauch (drawing by Johann Friedrich Overbeck)

=== Overbeck ===
- Johann Daniel Overbeck (1715–1802), theologian and dean of the Katharineum
- Christian Adolph Overbeck (1755–1821), mayor of Lübeck, novelist
- Christian Gerhard Overbeck (1784–1846), judge at the High Court of Appeal of the four free cities
- Johann Friedrich Overbeck (1789–1869), German painter, head of the Nazarene movement
- Christian Theodor Overbeck (1818–1880), senator of Lübeck
- Johannes Overbeck (1826–1895), German archaeologist

=== Petersen ===
- Carl Friedrich Petersen (1809–1892), mayor of Hamburg
- Carl Wilhelm Petersen (1868–1933), mayor of Hamburg
- Rudolf Petersen (1878–1962), mayor of Hamburg

=== Schröder ===
- Christian Matthias Schröder (1742–1821), mayor of Hamburg
- Christian Mathias Schröder (1778–1860), Hamburg senator
- Johann Heinrich Schröder (Freiherr John Henry Schröder) (1784–1883), Baron, Hamburg banker
- Carl August Schröder (1821–1902), Hamburg judge and member of parliament
- Carl August Schröder (1855–1945), mayor of Hamburg

=== Schuback ===
- Nicolaus Schuback (1700–1783), mayor of Hamburg

=== Siemers ===
- Edmund Siemers (1840–1918), Hamburg ship-owner
- Kurt Siemers (1873–1944), Hamburg ship-owner and banker
- Kurt Hartwig Siemers (1907–1988), Hamburg banker

=== Sillem ===
- Garlieb Sillem (1717–1732), mayor of Hamburg

=== Sloman ===
- Robert Miles Sloman (1783–1867), Hamburg ship-owner
- Henry Brarens Sloman (1848–1931), Hamburg ship-owner

=== Tesdorpf ===
- Peter Hinrich Tesdorpf (1648–1723), mayor of Lübeck
- Peter Hinrich Tesdorpf (1751–1832), mayor of Lübeck
- Johann Matthaeus Tesdorpf (1749–1824), mayor of Lübeck
- Adolph Tesdorpf (1811–1887), Hamburg senator
- Ebba Tesdorpf (1851–1920), Hamburg illustrator and watercolourist

== See also ==
- List of mayors of Hamburg – Hanseatics being those since approximately 1650, Hanseatic families are normally those of the mayors until 1918.
- Elbchaussee – Residential avenue in Hamburg, emblematic of a Hanseatic lifestyle.
- Patrician (post-Roman Europe)
- Aristocracy (class)
- Gentry
- Burgess (title)
- Bourgeoisie
- Bourgeois of Brussels
- Bildungsbürgertum

== Literature ==
- Lu Seegers (2016): Hanseaten: Mythos und Realität des ehrbaren Kaufmanns seit dem 19. Jahrhundert. (Hanseatic class: myth and reality of the honorable merchant since the 19th century). in: Katalog des Europäischen Hansemuseums, Lübeck 2016, p. 106-110.
- Lu Seegers (2014): Hanseaten und das Hanseatische in Diktatur und Demokratie: Politisch-ideologische Zuschreibungen und Praxen (Hanseatic League and the Hanseatic in Dictatorship and Democracy: Political-Ideological Attributions and Practices). in: Zeitgeschichte in Hamburg 2014, hrsg. von der Forschungsstelle für Zeitgeschichte in Hamburg (FZH), Hamburg 2015, p. 71-83.
