= Christian Theodor Overbeck =

German jurist and politician

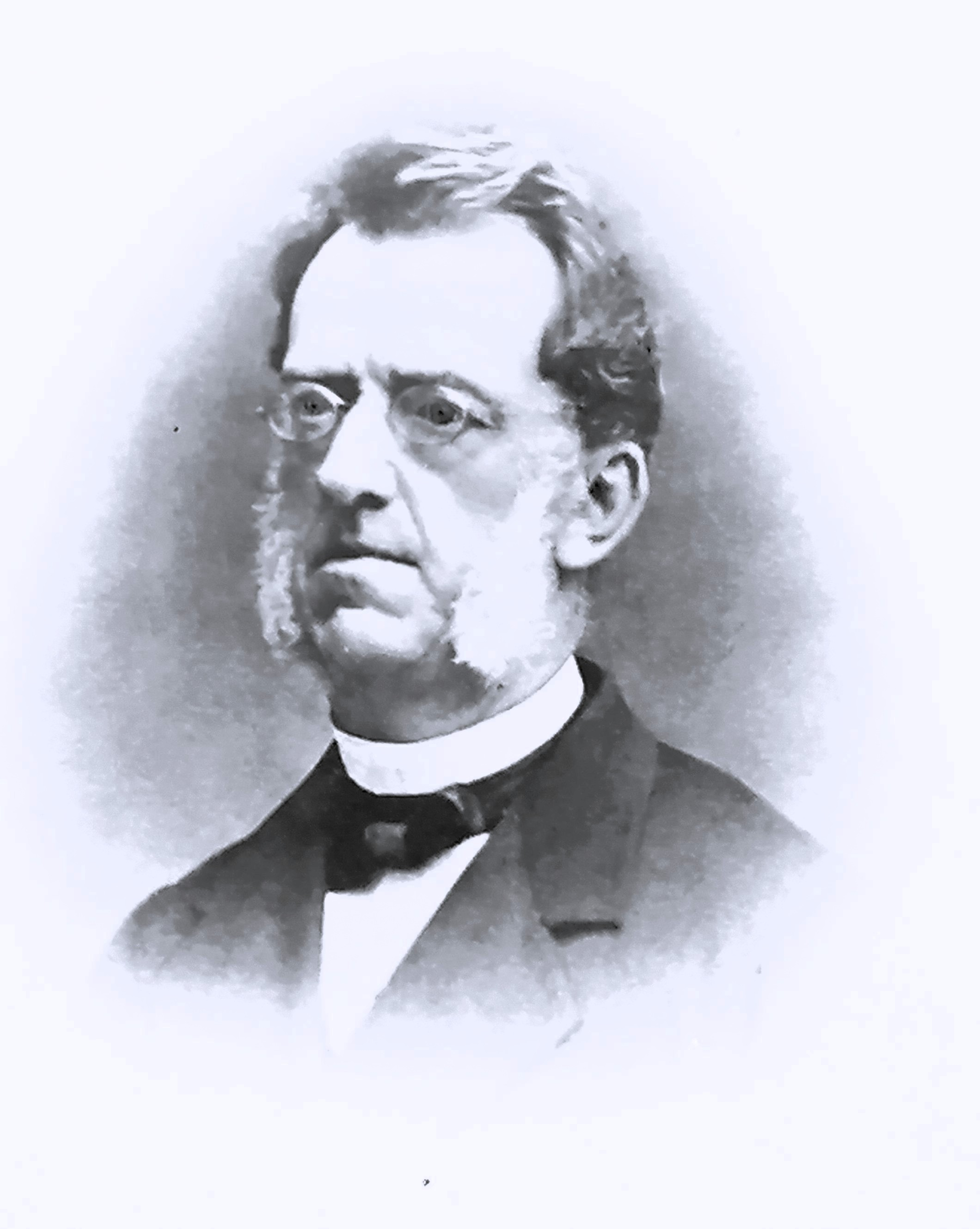
Christian Theodor Overbeck as a boy; portrait by Theodor Rehbenitz (1833)

Christian Theodor Overbeck (16 May 1818, in Lübeck – 23 March 1880, in Lübeck) was a German jurist and politician.

His father was the lawyer and Court of Appeals judge, Christian Gerhard Overbeck. He studied at the Katharineum, graduating in 1838.

After studying law and obtaining his Doctorate, he became a lawyer and notary in 1843. He was appointed Secretary of the Lübeck Senate (City Council) in 1850 and was elected a Senator in 1870. During his tenure, he served as President of the Churchyard and Funeral Commission (1873–1880), the Deputation for the Poor (1871–1876) and the City Land Office (1878–1880).

His collection of paintings and drawings by Friedrich Overbeck (his uncle) and Theodor Rehbenitz (his aunt's husband) was bequeathed to the city of Lübeck. They are currently held at the Behnhaus museum.

He was married to Charlotte Krüger, the daughter of Senator Joachim Friedrich Krüger. The poet and Bürgermeister, Christian Adolph Overbeck, was his grandfather.
