= Gesellschaft zur Beförderung gemeinnütziger Tätigkeit =

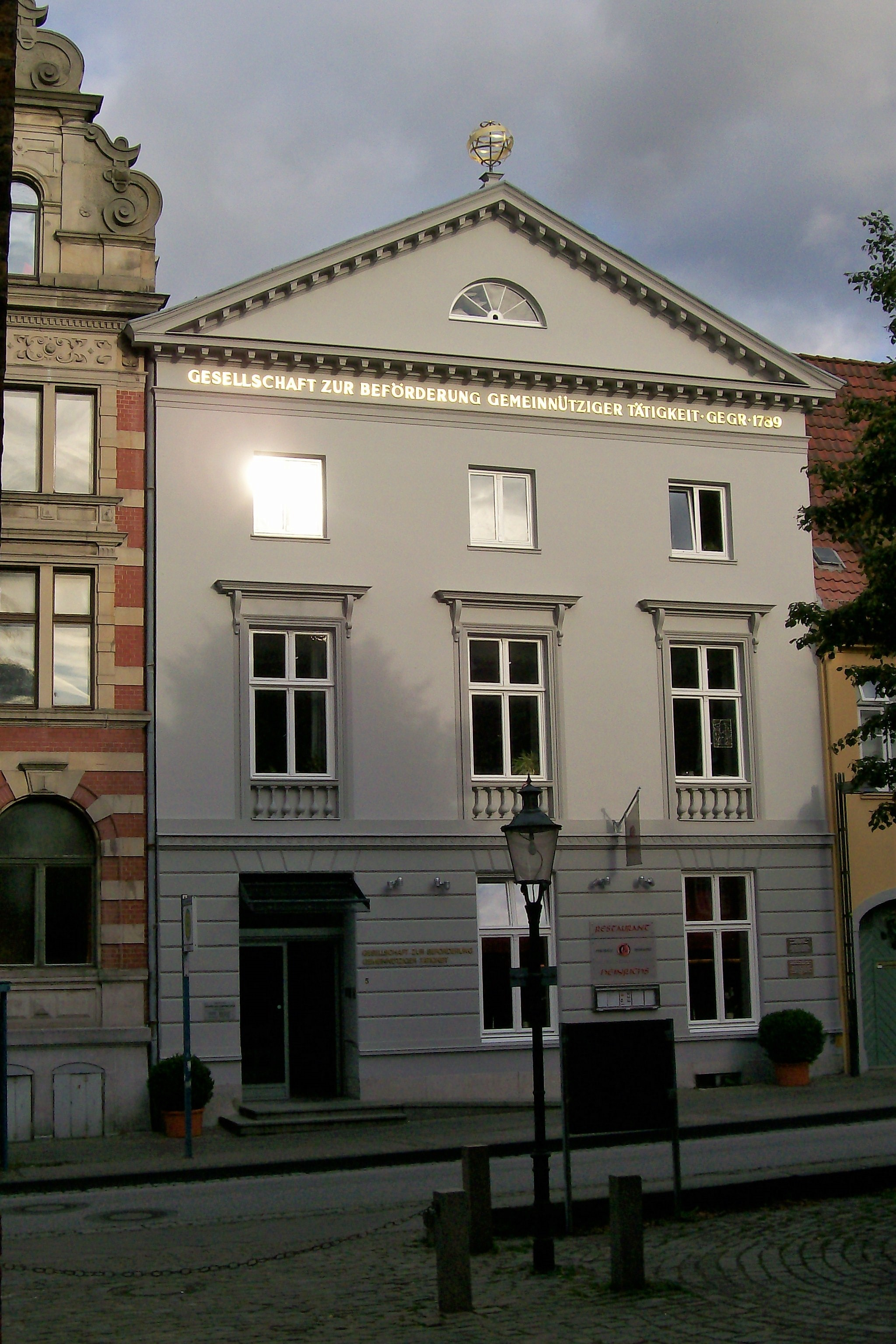
Gesellschaftshaus

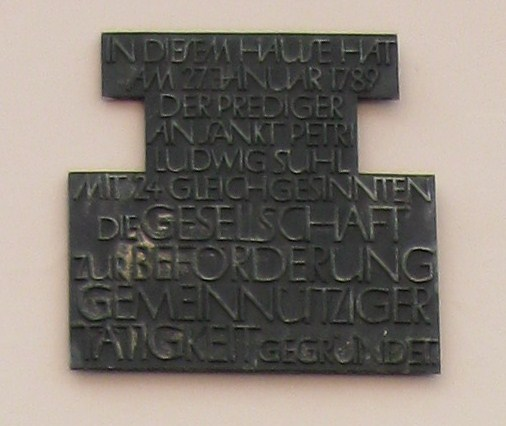
Memorial plaque, Großen Petersgrube 27

The Gesellschaft zur Beförderung gemeinnütziger Tätigkeit ("Society for the Furtherance of Charitable Activities") is Lübeck's oldest charitable organization.

== History ==
It was the preacher at St. Peter's Church, Lübeck (and later lawyer) Ludwig Suhl (1752–1819) and his friends Christian Adolph Overbeck, Johann Julius Walbaum, Anton Diedrich Gütschow, Gottlieb Nicolaus Stolterfoth, Johann Friedrich Petersen, and Nicolaus Heinrich Brehmer who, on 27 January 1789, founded this charity, first of all as a Literärische Gesellschaft ("literary society") with sidelines of scientific research and education; in 1791 the society's scope was broadened, and in 1793 it acquired the name it still bears today, although it is often abbreviated as the Gemeinnützige.

The democratically structured and middle class society and its social house (from 1826 at the address Breite Strasse 33, and from 1891 at Königstrasse 5) rapidly became the centre of practical reform work in the spirit of the Enlightenment. The company was involved in the improvement of conditions in many areas of life; for example, it established a River Lifesavers Institute. It was associated with the newspaper Neue Lübeckische Blätter and with the Jung-Lübeck, a Vormärz movement.

It ran the Sparkasse zu Lübeck, a credit union, and up to 1934 the Museum of Art and Cultural History. In 1938 their concert, theatre and lecture hall, the Kolosseum, was moved to the Kronsforder Allee.

On its hundredth anniversary in 1889 it received Lübeck's highest honour, the Gedenkmünze Bene Merenti. It is the only incorporated society to win this award. Eight former directors were given medals.

== Present ==
The society has numerous subsidiary societies and unions, which contribute to the cultural and social life of the city. For example, it found a home for the St. Mary's Boys' Choir on the premises of the society in the Bürgergärten. As a trustee it manages a large number of dependent organisations, such as the Ferdinand Heinrich Grautoff-Stiftung.

== Directors of the society ==
Name	Incumbency	Ratslinie	Notes	Portrait
Ludwig Suhl (1752–1819)	1789–1790		Founder; archdeacon at St. Peter's Church, Lübeck, founded the society at his home Großen Petersgrube 27, today part of the Musikhochschule ("Music High School")	
Christian Adolph Overbeck (1755–1821)	1791	949	Supreme Court procurator	
Adolph Friedrich Dehns (1740–1806)	1792		Senate secretary; son of the preacher at St. Giles's Church, Lübeck, Johann Balthasar Dehns, council secretary from 1769.	
**Ludwig Suhl	1793		Assessor of the cathedral chapter	
**Christian Adolph Overbeck	1794–1797	949	Second General Counsel of the chapter	
Gottlieb Nicolaus Stolterfoht (1763–1806)	1798–1801		Last preacher at the Burgkloster, and according to the Lübecker Adressbuch for 1798 also a preacher at the Heiligen-Geist-Hospital and the Pockenhaus. During the French invasion, the Battle of Lübeck, he was mortally wounded by a bullet in the hallway of his home.	
Anton Diedrich Gütschow	1802–1803		Counsel	
***Ludwig Suhl	1804–1808		Titular assessor	
Johann Friedrich Petersen (1760–1845)	1808–1814		Cathedral preacher. First recipient of the Gedenkmünze Bene Merenti (1835).	
Nicolaus Heinrich Brehmer (1765–1822)	1814–1818		Doctor, father of the senator and Burgomaster Heinrich Brehmer	
****Ludwig Suhl (died 1819)	1818–1819		Dr. jur., lawyer, titular assessor	
**Nicolaus Heinrich Brehmer	1819–1821		Doctor	
Bernhard Heinrich von der Hude	1821–1825		Pastor, St. Mary's Church, Lübeck	
Johann Friedrich Hach	1825–1830	955	Supreme Court of Appeal, recipient of the Gedenkmünze Bene Merenti (1850)	
Christian Gerhard Overbeck (1784–1846)	1830–1833		Supreme Court of Appeal, member of Jung-Lübeck movement	
**Johann Friedrich Hach	1833–1836		Supreme Court of Appeal	
**Christian Gerhard Overbeck	1836–1839		Supreme Court of Appeal	
Heinrich von der Hude 1798–1853	1839–1842		Supreme Court of Appeal procurator, also at the regional court and the Lower Court. In 1844 the third councillor and in 1852 senator	
Friedrich Boldemann (1788–1865)	1842–1845		Underwriting agent, Schonenfahrer and Citizen	
Johann Heinrich Behn	1845–1848		Actuary	
Johannes Classen	1848–1851		Professor at the Katharineum	
Hermann Wilhelm Hach (1800–1867)	1851–1854	992	Senator, son of the senator Johann Friedrich Hach.	
Georg Friedrich Ludwig Oppenheimer	1854–1856		Supreme Court of Appeal councillor	
Karl Martin Joachim Klug	1856–1859		Pastor at St. Jacob's Church, Lübeck	
Friedrich Wilhelm Mantels	1859–1862		Professor at the Katharineum, former member of Jung-Lübeck movement	
Wilhelm von Bippen (Arzt) († 1865)	1862–1865		Practising physician	
Heinrich Gustav Plitt	1865–1868	1002	Director of the Lower Court, from 1868 senator	
Wilhelm Brehmer	1868–1871	1005	Lawyer, from 1870 senator, recipient of the Gedenkmünze Bene Merenti (1901)	
Carl Alexander von Duhn	1871–1874		Member of the Supreme Court, former member of the Jung-Lübeck movement	
Friedrich Adolph Hach (1832–1896)	1874–1877		Actuary for the Police	
August Heinrich Sartori	1877–1889		Teacher at the Katharineum, from 1880 professor	
Heinrich Klug	1886–1889	1012	Senator, recipient of the Gedenkmünze Bene Merenti (1904)	
Johann Georg Eschenburg	1883–1886	1017	Senate secretary, from 1885 senator, recipient of the Gedenkmünze Bene Merenti (1910)	
**Heinrich Klug	1886–1889	1012	Senator	
Ernst Christian Johannes Schön	1889–1892	1022	Public prosecutor	
Adolf Brehmer	1892–1895		Lawyer	
Emil Ferdinand Fehling	1895–1898	1023	Lawyer, from 1896 senator, recipient of the Gedenkmünze Bene Merenti (1917)	
Johannes Daniel Benda	1898–1901		District court judge, from 1901 public prosecutor, recipient of the Gedenkmünze Bene Merenti (1919)	
Ernst Julius Ludwig Müller	1901–1904		Director of the Johanneum	
**Ernst Christian Johannes Schön	1904–1907	1022	Senator	
Johann Martin Andreas Neumann	1907–1910	1029	Senator	
Karl Friedrich Robert Dimpker	1910–1913	1037	Counsel and praeses of the Board of Trade	
Christian Reuter	1913–1915		Director of the Katharineum	
Cay Diedrich Lienau	1915–1918	1034	Senator	
Johann Hermann Friedrich Evers	1918–1921		Pastor of St. Mary's	
Hermann Stodte	1921–1924		Direktor at the Johanneum	
Rudolf Keibel	1924–1927		First Counsel of the Board of Trade	
Adolf Ihde	1927–1930		born 1881 in Lübeck, died 1959 in Sierksdorf; lawyer and notary	
Karl Utermarck	1930–1933		District court president	
Hans Sellschopp	1933–1938		Merchant	
Bernhard Otto Clausen	1939–1945		Leader in the NSDAP	
**Adolf Ihde	1945–1949		Lawyer and notary	
Wilhelm Kusche († 1951)	1949–1951		Director at the cathedral school	
Rolf Sander	1952–1958		District court councillor	
Gerhard Gaul	1958–1961		Lawyer and notary. Recipient of the Gedenkmünze Bene Merenti (1982)	
Gerhard Schneider	1961–1964		Senator	
**Rolf Sander	1964–1966		Judge at the district court	
Werner Dalstein	1967–1969		Planning director	
Julius Edelhoff	1970–1972		Chief medical director	
Gerhard Lund	1973–1975		Lawyer and notary	
Christoph Deecke	1976–1978		Architect	
Boto Kusserow	1979–1984		Lawyer and notary	
**Christoph Deecke (1924–2004)	1985		Architect	
Hans-Helmke Goosmann (b. 1927)	1991–1996		Architect	
Renate Menken (b. 1943)	1997–2002		Pharmacist	
Helmut Wischmeyer (b. 1935)	2003–2005		Property developer	
Antje Peters-Hirt (b. 1953)	2006–2011		Germanist	

Note. The term of office is three years; immediately following terms are not specifically highlighted in the table, but can be deduced. Additional terms of office, after the term of a different incumbent, are marked by asterisks, so ** indicates a second additional period, and *** indicates a third. The Ratslinie number gives the position in the official register of 1925, Emil Ferdinand Fehling's Ratslinie.

== See also ==
- Lübeckische Blätter, newspaper
- Der Wagen, an almanac for Lübeck
- Patriotische Gesellschaft von 1765 ("Patriotic Society of 1765") in Hamburg
- Gesellschaft für das Gute und Gemeinnützige Basel, a charity in Basel

== Bibliography ==
- Friedrich Bruns: Die Lübecker Syndiker und Ratssekretäre bis zur Verfassungsänderung von 1851 in: ZVLGA Band 29 (1938), S. 91 – 168.
- Hermann Stodte: Festschrift zur 150-Jahr-Feier der Gesellschaft zur Beförderung gemeinnütziger Tätigkeit zu Lübeck, begründet 1789. Lübeck 1939.
- Georg Behrens, 175 Jahre Gemeinnütziges Wirken, Lübeck 1964
- Ahasver von Brandt: Das Lübecker Bürgertum zur Zeit der Gründung der "Gemeinnützigen" – Menschen, Ideen und soziale Verhältnisse. In: Der Wagen 1966, S. 18–33.
- Emil Ferdinand Fehling, Lübeckische Ratslinie, Lübeck 1925.
- Vorsteherschaft der Gesellschaft (Hrsg.), 200 Jahre Gesellschaft zur Beförderung gemeinnütziger Tätigkeit in Lübeck 1789–1989, Lübeck 1989
