= Hanseatic Legion =

Hanseatic Legion Hanseatische Legion
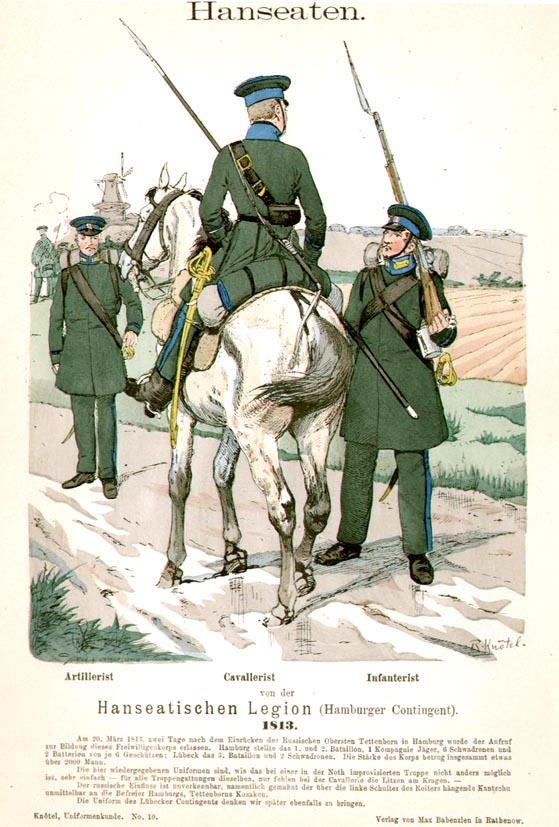
- Hanseaten. Hamburg contingent of the Hanseatic Legion and Hamburger Bürgermilitär. 1813–14
- Active: 1813–1815
- Country: Bremen, Hamburg and Lübeck
- Nickname: Hanseaten
- Engagements: Battle of the Göhrde in the Napoleonic Wars

Commanders
- Notable commanders: Karl August Friedrich von Witzleben; Sir Neil Campbell

The Hanseatic Legion was a military unit, first formed of a group of citizens from Hamburg. They had met in 1813 on the instigation of General Friedrich Karl von Tettenborn, in order to fight in the War of the Sixth Coalition. This association of volunteers was joined immediately by volunteers from Hamburg's Hanseatic sister cities Bremen and Lübeck.

The Legion should not be confused with the Hamburger Bürgermilitär (Hamburg Citizen Militia). During their time of coexistence, the militia restricted itself to ejecting the French garrisons stationed in Hamburg and the other two Hanseatic cities, whereas the Legion also participated in the rest of the campaign under Russian overall command.

== History ==
The Legion defended the Hanseatic cities against Davout's and Vandamme's troops until Tettenborn completed the raising of their sieges in the night of 29/30 May 1813. The Legion and the Hanseatischen Bürgergarden went with Count Tettenborn and in Mecklenburg joined the Allied northern army under Wallmoden's command, later taking part in the fighting in the area around Mecklenburg and in parts of the Duchy of Schleswig.

The members of the Legion returned to Bremen, Hamburg and Lübeck on 30 June 1814, and all received the "Kriegsdenkmedaille der drei Hansestädte" (War-Medal of the three Hanseatic-League cities) in 1815.

== See also ==
- Bouches-de-l'Elbe

== Sources ==
- Perthes: W. Perthes Leben. Bd. 1 Gotha (1892)
- Heilwig Prosch: Die Hanseatische Legion 1815 nach Senatsakten und Familienbriefen. In: Der Wagen 1960, S. 66–77.
- Uniforms of the Legion
