= Sparkasse zu Lübeck =

German public savings bank

Coordinates: 53.87023°N 10.68757°E

Sparkasse zu Lübeck AG
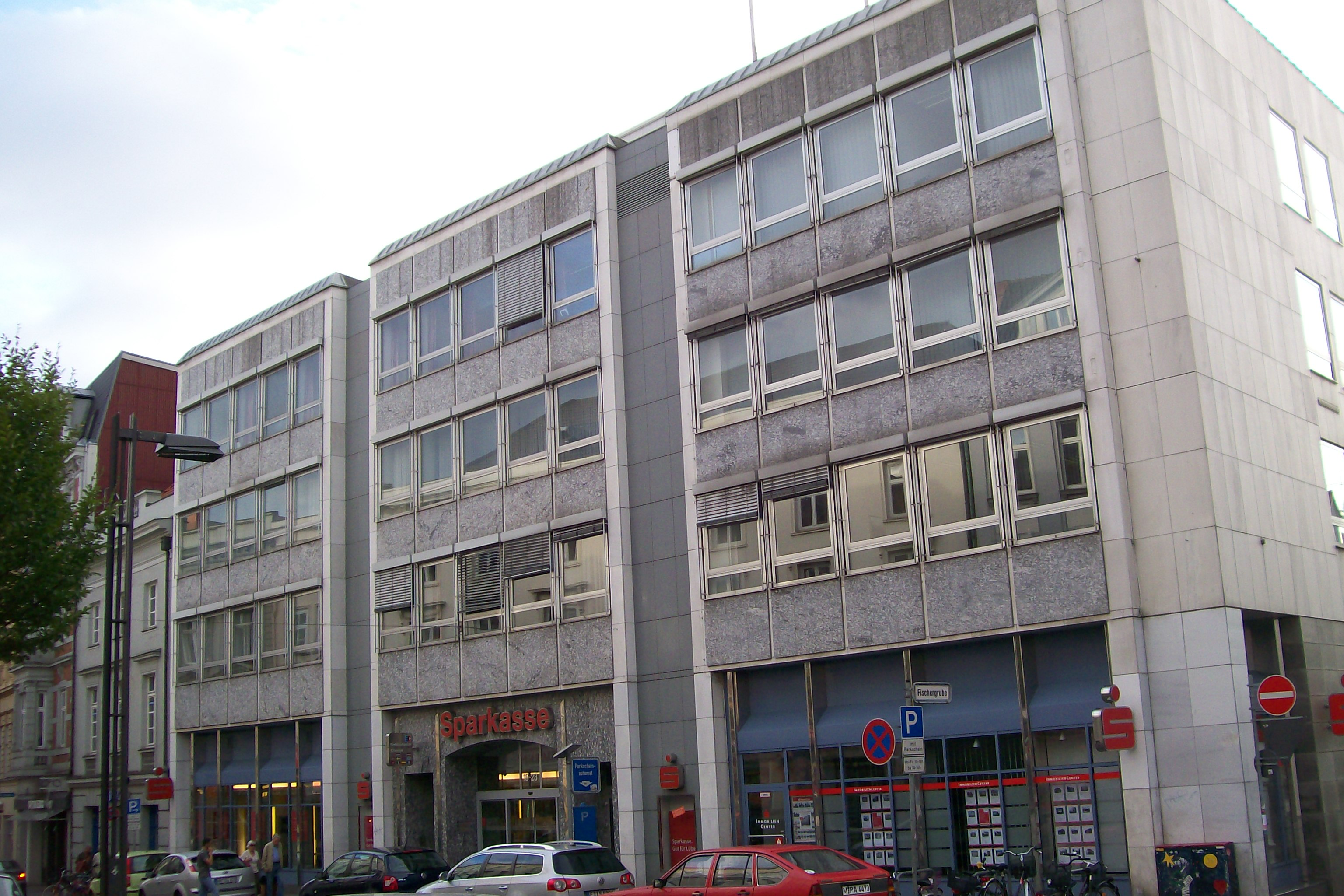
- Sparkasse zu Lübeck in the Breite Straße of 1965
- Type: Corporation
- Founded: 1817
- Headquarters: Lübeck, Germany
- Total assets: €2.85 billion (2018)
- Number of employees: 476 (2018)
- Website: http://www.spk-luebeck.de/

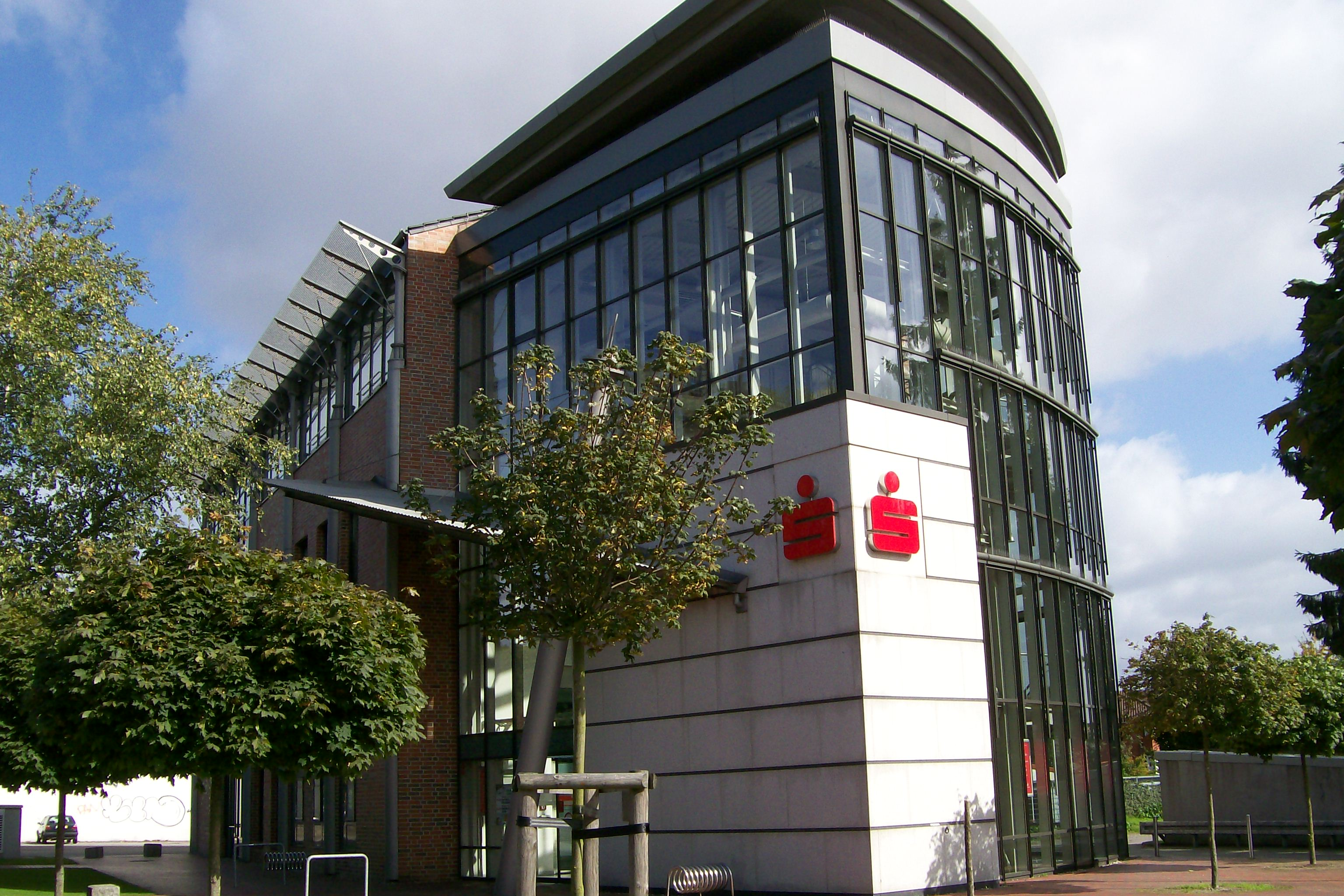
Branch in Ziegelstraße in St. Lorenz St. Lorenz

The Sparkasse zu Lübeck AG, based in Lübeck, is one of five free public savings banks that still exist in Germany.

== Organizational structure ==
The Sparkasse zu Lübeck AG has been registered in the commercial register since 1 November 2004 as a stock corporation. The legal basis for the bank is essentially the Kreditwesengesetz (KWG) and the Sparkassengesetz for Schleswig-Holstein. The bodies of the savings bank are the Annual General Meeting, the Supervisory Board and the Management Board.

== History ==
The savings bank was founded in 1817 under the name "Spar- und Anleih-Kasse" as a dependent Gesellschaft zur Beförderung gemeinnütziger Tätigkeit (institution of the society for the promotion of charitable activity). The first business day was June 12, 1817. It was held in the now-defunct orphanage near the Lübeck Cathedral. The core task of the new bank was to give the city, which was devastated by the Napoleonic occupation and the following wars of liberation, and its inhabitants an opportunity "to secure the return on their savings or their purchases safely and affordably", thus at the same time to act as a capital collection point. The deposits were lent mostly as mortgage loans.

As a result of the recently introduced Bürgerliches Gesetzbuch (Civil Code), the savings bank obtained in 1905 legal independence in the legal form of a foundation.

As early as 1825, the savings bank moved from the orphanage to a new premise at Breite Straße 16. In 1912, the bank moved into the newly built commercial building Breite Straße 18 next-door. At this point, in the 1965 built house, the seat of the Sparkasse is still today. In 1937 the Sparkasse zu Lübeck, which at that time still carried the name Spar- und Anleihe-Kasse zu Lübeck , took over the Sparkasse in Travemünde. The name Sparkasse zu Lübeck was adopted by the bank in 1958. In 2004, the bank's banking operations were spun off the foundation and transferred to a public limited company, today's Sparkasse zu Lübeck AG. The foundation that had once supported the Sparkasse became a nonprofit organization, the Gemeinnützige Sparkassenstiftung zu Lübeck, holding the majority in the Sparkasse zu Lübeck AG with 74%. From its interest and dividends, the foundation supports charitable and benevolent projects in Lübeck with millions each year. The remaining shares are held by Haspa Finanzholding in Hamburg.

== Business focus ==
The Sparkasse zu Lübeck AG operates in its business area as a savings bank in the universal banking business. Among others, it cooperates with LBS Bausparkasse Schleswig-Holstein-Hamburg AG, Provinzial NordWest, insurer neue leben in Hamburg, HSH Nordbank, LGS Leasinggesellschaft Deutsche Leasing AG and DekaBank. Not infrequently, the Sparkasse zu Lübeck was a pioneer in the introduction of new products. In 1985, for example, the Sparkasse zu Lübeck was the first savings bank in Schleswig-Holstein to issue listed bearer bonds and, since 2004, the first savings bank in the federal territory to issue debentures.

== See also ==
- List of banks in Germany
