= Albrecht Dietz =

German businessman (1926–2012)

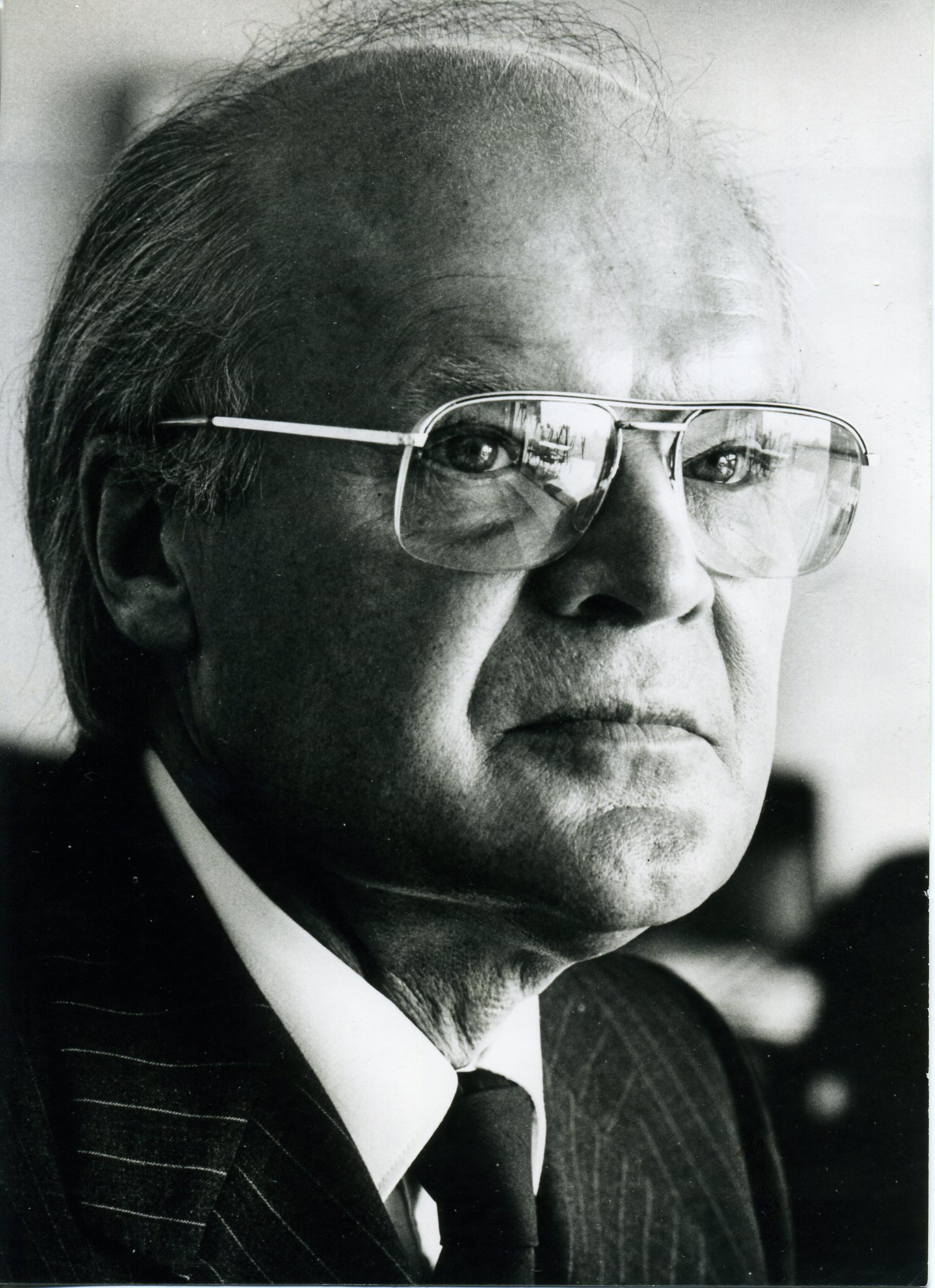
Albrecht Dietz.

Albrecht Dietz (11 March 1926 – 21 March 2012) was a German entrepreneur and scientist who founded the first leasing company in Germany. He was considered to be one of the pioneers and founding fathers of the German leasing industry. His publications on economic subjects ranged from leasing and corporate management to institutions and evolutionary economics.

== Biography ==
Albrecht Dietz was born in Dresden as the son of merchant and inventor, Albert Dietz, and the early-childhood educator, Lydia Dietz. After taking his school-leaving exam in 1944 at the Dresden Grammar School of Business and Economics he went on to study economics and law; at first at the TU Dresden and later, following the bombing of Dresden in 1945, at the University Jena from which he graduated in 1947 with a degree in Business Studies. In 1948 he became a scientific assistant to Erich Gutenberg at the Goethe University in Frankfurt am Main. He received his PhD in 1949 with a doctoral dissertation titled “Die Theorie der Overhead Costs” (The Theory of Overhead Costs ).

Dietz began professional life as an auditor in 1949 at the Deutsche Revisions- und Treuhand AG in Frankfurt am Main. From 1953 he occupied diverse posts in the office machinery industry, among them a position as manager of the financial and accounting office of the German Olivetti AG, as sales director at Ankerwerke AG and as managing director at Deutsche Underwood GmbH (see also Underwood Typewriter Company). He became acquainted with easing in the United States in the late 1950s. In 1962, he founded Maschinen Miete GmbH as the managing partner. It was the first leasing company for mobile goods together with Deutsche Leasing GmbH. Dietz had become the founding father and pioneer of a successful industry. In 1971, the leasing forerunner trio, Deutsche Leasing GmbH, Maschinen Miete GmbH and Mietdienst GmbH, merged to form Deutsche Leasing AG, of which Albrecht Dietz was the CEO from 1971 until 1991. Dietz also acted as President of the German Association of Leasing Companies and played a major role in drawing up the leasing directives of German tax legislation at the beginning of the 1970s. They still form the legal basis of leasing contracts today. For some years he also was a member of the Board of Leaseurope, the European Federation of Leasing Company Associations.

After 1982, he taught and researched in the areas of leasing economics, corporate management and institutional economy. He participated in international research seminars of the Max Planck Institute for Research into Economic Systems (today the Max Planck Institute of Economics) in Jena. He was an Honorary Professor at the Faculty of Economic Sciences of the Goethe University of Frankfurt am Main.

Albrecht Dietz was married to Elisabeth Dietz and had three children.

== Awards and Distinctions ==
- Cross of the Order of Merit of the Federal Republic of Germany, 1992 (Bundesverdienstkreuz)

== Selected publications ==
Prof. Dietz has mainly published writings in German. The following is, therefore, just a small selection of his works.

- Dietz, Albrecht: Die Theorie der Overhead Costs, (The Theory of Overhead Costs), diss. Frankfurt am Main 1949.
- Dietz, Albrecht: Die betriebswirtschaftlichen Grundlagen des Leasing (The Business Management Principles of Leasing) in: Archiv für civilistische Praxis (Civil Practice Archives), Volume 190, Book 3–4, 1990, published at the same time in the ZfB Zeitschrift für Betriebswirtschaft (Journal of Business Economics) No.11, 1990
- Dietz, Albrecht: Reflexionen über die "Grundlagen der Betriebswirtschaftslehre" (Reflections on the "Principles of Business Studies") on the occasion of Erich Gutenberg’s 100th birthday, in: zfbf Schmalenbach’s Zeitschrift für betriebswirtschaftliche Forschung (zfbf Schmalenbachs Journal of Business Economics), Verlagsgruppe Handelsblatt Düsseldorf/Frankfurt publishers, Book 12, December 1997.
- Dietz, Albrecht: Der Manager als Entrepreneur (The Manager as Entrepreneur) in: Die Rollen eines Managers (The Roles of a Manager), Eggert, Kati (compiler), Fritz Knapp Publishers 2010
