= Christian Gerhard Overbeck =

German jurist and judge (1784–1846)

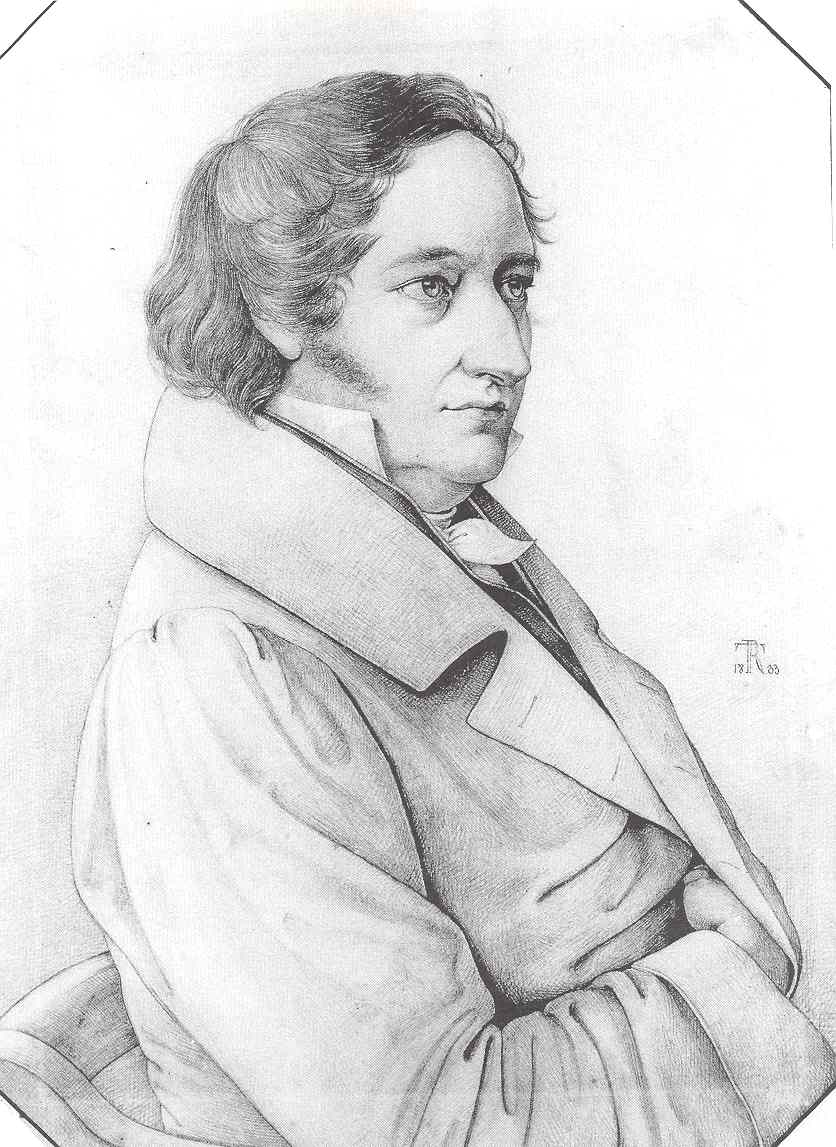
- Portrait by Theodor Rehbenitz (1833)

Judge of the Oberappellationsgericht der vier Freien Städte
- In office 28 May 1824 – 1846

Personal details
- Born: 5 January 1784 Lübeck
- Died: January 29, 1846 (aged 62) Lübeck
- Spouse: Augusta Rehbenitz
- Relations: Johann Friedrich Overbeck (brother)
- Children: Christian Theodor Overbeck
- Parent: Christian Adolph Overbeck (father)

Christian Gerhard Overbeck (5 January 1784, Lübeck – 29 January 1846, Lübeck) was a German jurist and judge.

== Life and work ==
Overbeck was born on 5 January 1784. He was the eldest of five children born to Christian Adolph Overbeck, a lawyer, politician and poet. His brother, Friedrich, became a painter; one of the founders of the Nazarene movement. After graduating from the Katharineum in 1802, he studied law at the University of Jena, primarily with Anton Friedrich Justus Thibaut. There, he studied philosophy and history and became part of the social circle around the bookseller, Carl Friedrich Ernst Frommann. When Thibaut moved to the University of Heidelberg in 1805, Overbeck followed him. He also studied with Georg Arnold Heise, and received his Doctorate in 1806.

In 1807, he was appointed Justitiar at St. John's Monastery, followed by an appointment as Syndic at Schonenfahrer College. Due to Lübeck's recent incorporation into the French Empire, he was also able to join the local Tribunal as a "Juge suppléant" and received permission to work at the Court of Appeals in Hamburg. During this time, he published one of his most important legal writings; Über die Fortdauer der Gültigkeit älterer Hypotheken auf Mobilien, namentlich der Hypothekwechsel, nach neuerem Recht (On the continuation of the validity of older mortgages on chattels, namely the change of mortgage, according to more recent law, 1812).

In 1810, he married Augusta Rehbenitz, sister of the painter, Theodor Rehbenitz. They had five children, but only one outlived him; Christian Theodor Overbeck, who also entered the legal profession and served in the Lübeck Senate.

At the end of the French period, in 1813, he became an actuary at the District Court. In 1822, he was elected to the Oberappellationsgericht der vier Freien Städte (High Court of Appeal of the Four Free Cities) and began his duties on 28 May 1824. In 1833, he received support for becoming the successor to Anton Diedrich Gütschow as Syndicus der Hansestadt Lübeck, but this effort was unsuccessful.

Over the course of his career, he was involved with and created several charitable societies; beginning in 1807, when he became a major sponsor of the "Gesellschaft zur Beförderung gemeinnütziger Tätigkeit" (Society for the Furtherance of Charitable Activities). He would serve as its Director twice; from 1830 to 1833, and 1836 to 1839. He founded an industrial school, two kindergartens, and the "Verein zur Fürsorge für entlassene Strafgefangene" (Association for the welfare of released prisoners, 1840).

Overbeck died on 29 January 1846.

== Published works ==
- Overbeck, Christian Gerhard (1806). Dissertatio inauguralis de collocatione depositi tam regularis quam irregularis in concursu creditorum (in Lithuanian). Heidelberg: Gutmann.
- Overbeck, Christian Gerhard (1812). Ueber die Fortdauer der Gültigkeit älterer Hypotheken auf Mobilien, namentlich der Hypothek-Wechsel, nach neuerem Rechte: Ein Beytrag zur Erklärung des Artikels 157 des Kaiserlichen Organisations-Decrets vom 4. July 1811 (in German). Hamburg: Perthes.
- Overbeck, Christian Gerhard (1830). Zur Erinnerung an Christian Adolph Overbeck: beider Rechte Doctor und Bürgermeister zu Lübeck (in German). Lübeck: Borchers.

== Bibliography ==
- Behn, Heinrich Theodor (1848). "Christian Gerhard Overbeck". Neuer Nekrolog der Deutschen (in German). Vol. 24. Weimar: Voigt. pp. 882–890.
- Steger, Friedrich, ed. (1846). "Christian Gerhard Overbeck". Ergänzungs-Conversationslexikon (in German). Leipzig: Romberg. pp. 678–680.
