= Christian Adolph Overbeck =

German poet

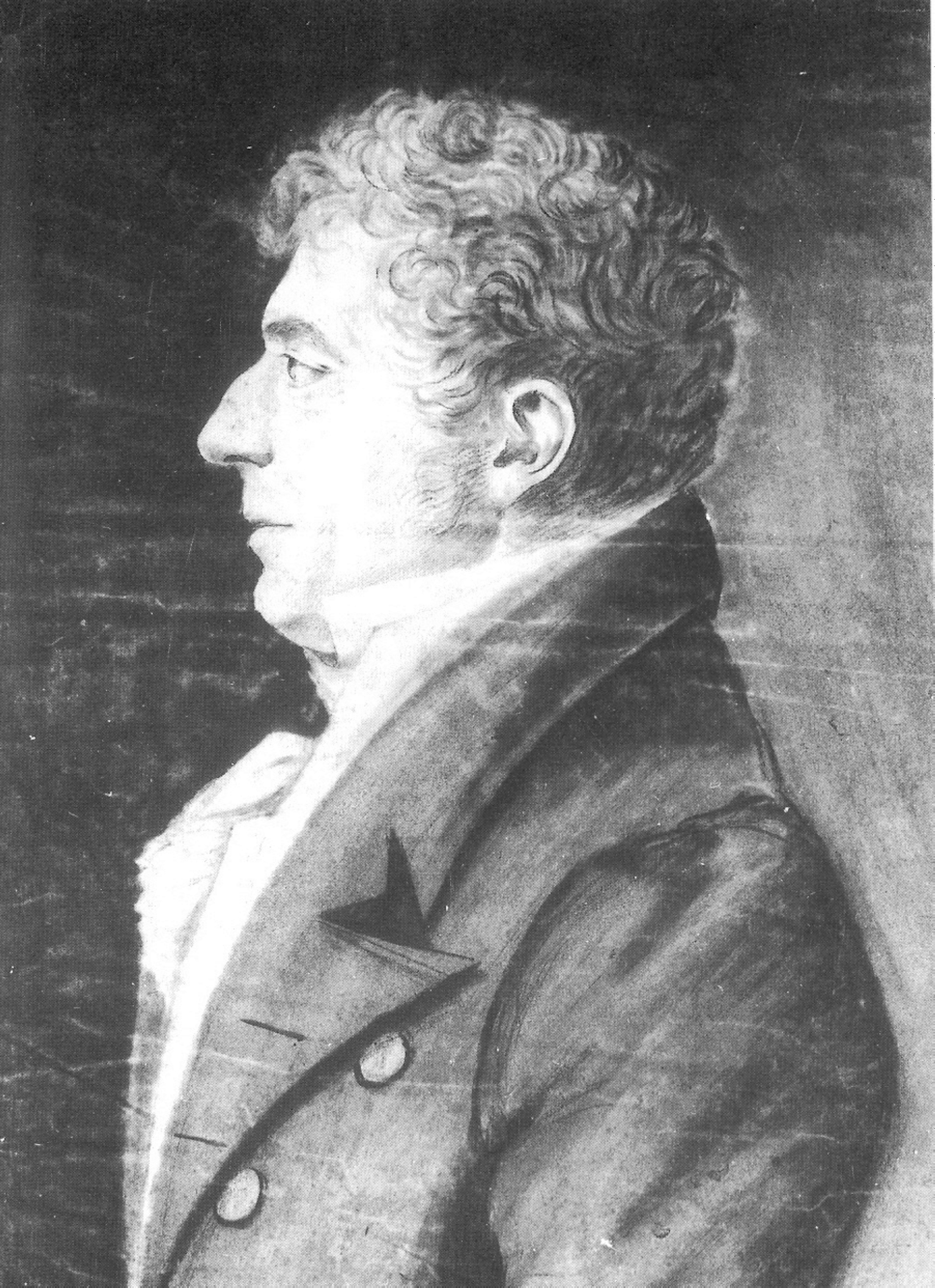
Christian Adolph Overbeck (painting by Johann Friedrich Overbeck)

Christian Adolph Overbeck (21 August 1755 in Lübeck – 9 March 1821 in Lübeck) was a German poet, and the Burgomaster of Lübeck.

== Life ==
=== Family ===
Overbeck was the son of the lawyer, Georg Christian Overbeck (1713–1786) and his wife Eleonora Maria Jauch (1732–1797), and also grandson of the superintendent Caspar Nikolaus Overbeck (1670–1752). He was the nephew of the rector of the Katharineum, Johann Daniel Overbeck (1715-1802). The painter, Friedrich Overbeck (1789–1869), and the jurist, Christian Gerhard Overbeck (1784–1846) were his sons. His grandson was the archeologist Johannes Adolph Overbeck (1826–1895). In 1781 Overbeck married Elisabeth Lang (1753–1820), whose family was originally from Nürtingen and shared ancestors with Friedrich Hölderlin and Ludwig Uhland.

=== Education ===
He studied at the Katharineum of Lübeck, of which the rector was his uncle Johann Daniel Overbeck (1715–1802), and then from 1773 to 1776 studied law at the University of Göttingen, meanwhile attending lectures on philosophical, mathematical, scientific and historical subjects. Overbeck had many friends in the Göttinger Hainbund, but was never a member. In 1788 he acquired his doctorate and from then on prefixed his name with "Dr.iur.utr."

=== Professional career ===
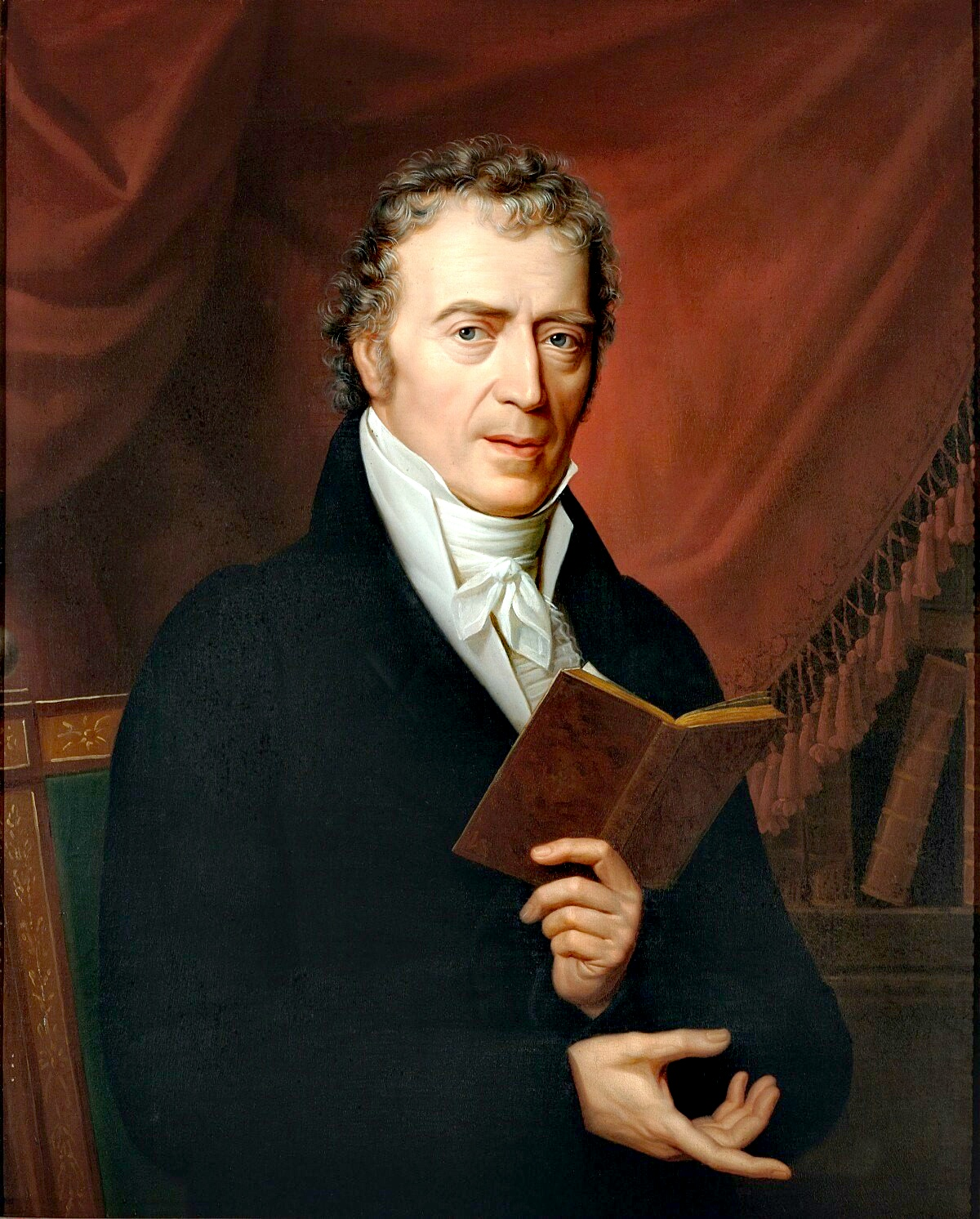
Christian Adolph Overbeck. Portrait by Rudolph Suhrlandt, 1818

Overbeck's career began with a failed attempt in 1776 to found a school, the Erziehungsanstalt für Knaben, in Bremen, after the example of Joachim Heinrich Campes. In the same year he began his legal career as a barrister in Lübeck, and in 1779 he was appointed Supreme Court procurator. In 1792 he became assistant general counsel of the cathedral chapter of Lübeck. In 1800 this was followed by his appointment to the Senate of Lübeck. In 1804 he was a representative of Lübeck in St Petersburg, and in 1808-9, 1810 and 1811 a representative of Lübeck in Paris, when he attended the wedding of Napoleon I of France with Marie-Louise of Austria. During Lübeck's occupation by France he filled the office of Receveur de la caisse communale. In 1814 he finally became Burgomaster of Lübeck.

=== Other responsibilities ===
On 16 October 1776 Overbeck joined the Freemasons' lodge Zum goldenen Zirkel in Göttingen and on 31 March 1777 became a member of the Lübeck lodge Zum Füllhorn, where from 1791 to 1797 he served as chairman five times. In 1779 he became Mitstifter at another Lübeck lodge, Zur Weltkugel. He was an Illuminatus under the name Anacreon. In 1789 he helped to establish the Gesellschaft zur Beförderung gemeinnütziger Tätigkeit, and in 1791 and 1794–1797 he was its director. He was also a praeses for the Bible Society.

== Significance ==
Overbeck utilised his diplomatic skills during the French occupation of Lübeck, and his skills as a jurist during the reorganisation of the city's constitution and finances after the years of war. He distinguished himself by his enlightened attitude to reform in the areas of school, church and poor relief. In addition, he showed artistic talent as a composer and songwriter. He had a gift for languages, demonstrated in translations of Greek and Latin odes, French drama and English travel literature.

== Quotations ==
- "This great Hanseat, who during the French occupation of Lübeck defended its interests so ably in Paris and thus contributed so much to the wellbeing and prosperity of his native city, is a shining example of the kind of responsible model citizen in the latter half of the 18th century to which the Hanseatic myth owes so much."
- "The model of a gentleman."

== Works ==
- 1781 Fritzchens Lieder ("Little Fritz's Songs"), including "Komm, lieber Mai, und mache die Bäume wieder grün" ("Come, dear May, and make the trees green once more"), set by Wolfgang Amadeus Mozart
- 1781 Lieder und Gesänge mit Klaviermelodien ("Songs with piano accompaniment")
- 1785 Salve Regina and Stabat Mater, piano transcriptions from Giovanni Battista Pergolesi, with German words
- 1794 Vermischte Gedichte ("Miscellaneous poems")
- 1800 Anakreon und Sappho ("Anacreon and Sappho")
- 1803 Leben Herrn Johann Daniel Overbecks, weyland Doctors der Theologie und Rectors des Lübeckischen Gymnasiums. Von einem nahen Verwandten, und vormaligen Schüler des Verewigten. Anonymously published biography of his uncle.
- Unpublished translations of El Cid and Cinna by Pierre Corneille
- Unpublished translations of Athalie, Bajazet, Berenice and Britannicus by Jean Racine

== Portraits ==
- Overbeck, Friedrich: pencil drawing, 1806, Berlin, Kupferstichkabinett und Sammlung der Zeichnungen
- Overbeck, Friedrich: charcoal, before 1806, Lübeck, Museen für Kunst und Kulturgeschichte
- Suhrland, R.: oil painting, Luchmann, in: Biographisches Lexikon Schleswig Holstein X, 1994, S.281ff

== Bibliography ==
- "Christian Adolph Overbeck". Allgemeine Deutsche Biographie (in German). Vol. 25. Leipzig: Duncker & Humblot. 1887. pp. 5–6.
- "Christian Adolph Overbeck". Neue Deutsche Biographie (in German). Vol. 19. Berlin: Duncker & Humblot. 1999. pp. 720–721.
- Biographisches Lexikon Schleswig-Holstein X, S.281
- Emil Ferdinand Fehling: Lübeckische Ratslinie, Lübeck 1925, Nr. 949.
- Overbeck, Christian Gerhard: Zur Erinnerung an Christian Adolph Overbeck, beider Rechte Doctor und Bürgermeister zu Lübeck, Lübeck 1830
- Jansen, H.: Aus dem Göttinger Hainbund, Overbeck und Sprickmann, Ungedruckte Briefe Overbecks, 1933
- Gaedertz, Karl Theodor: Was ich am Wege fand. Neue Folge. Die beiden Overbeck, Leipzig 1905
- Luchmann, Fritz (Hg.): Beieinanderseyn ist das tägliche Brot. Briefe C.A. Overbecks an seine Familie aus St.Petersburg 1804 und aus Paris 1807 - 1811., Lübeck 1992
- Sellheim, Isabel: Die Familie des Malers Friedrich Overbeck (1789-1869) in genealogischen Übersichten, Deutsches Familienarchiv Band 104, Neustadt an der Aisch 1989, ISBN 3-7686-5091-X, GW ISSN 0012-1266
