= Theodor Rehbenitz =

German painter

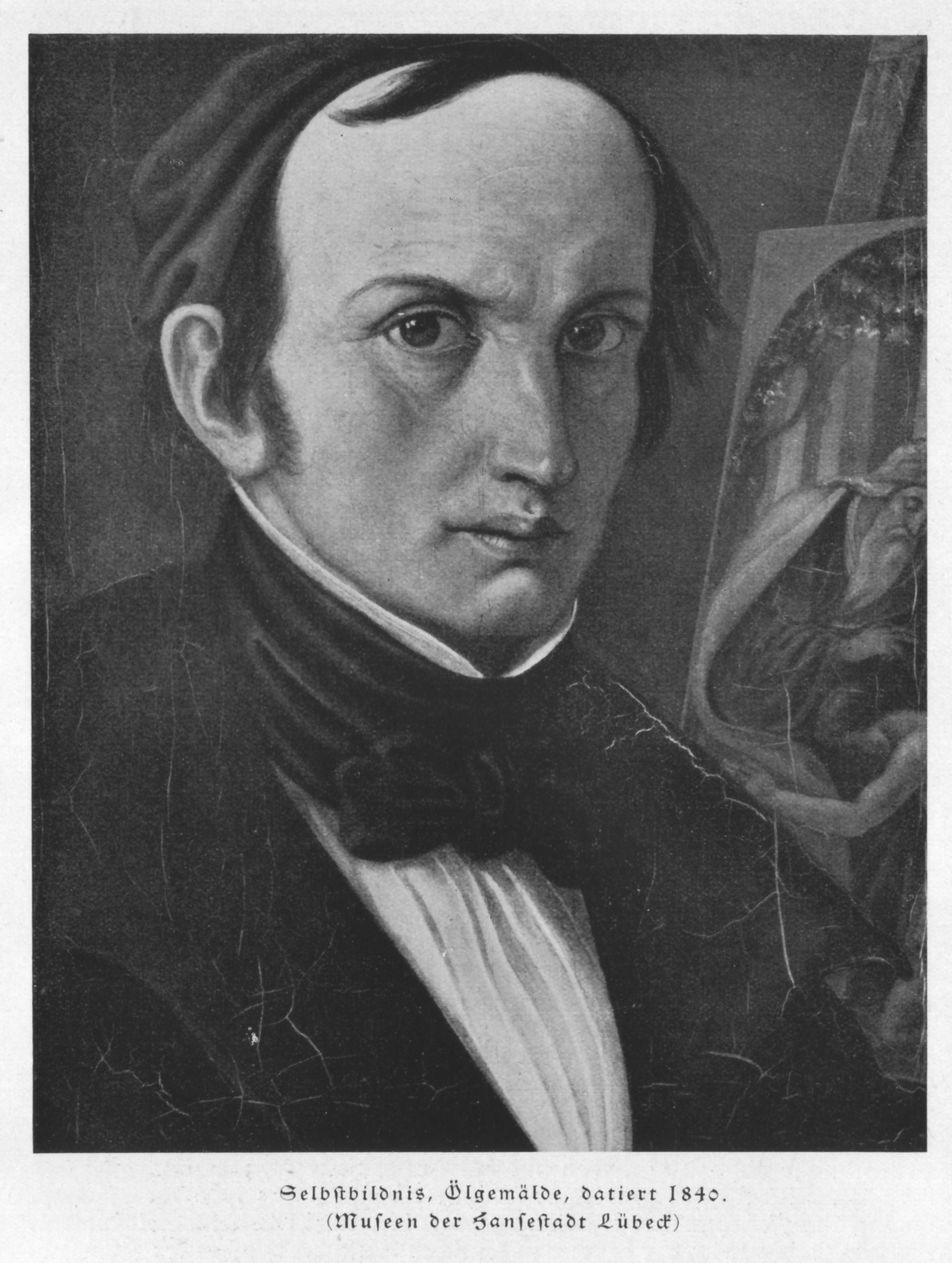
Self-portrait (1840)

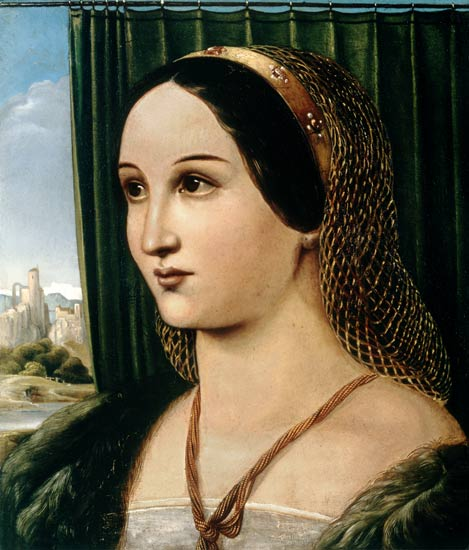
Portrait of a Young Italian Woman (Vittoria Caldoni), c.1821

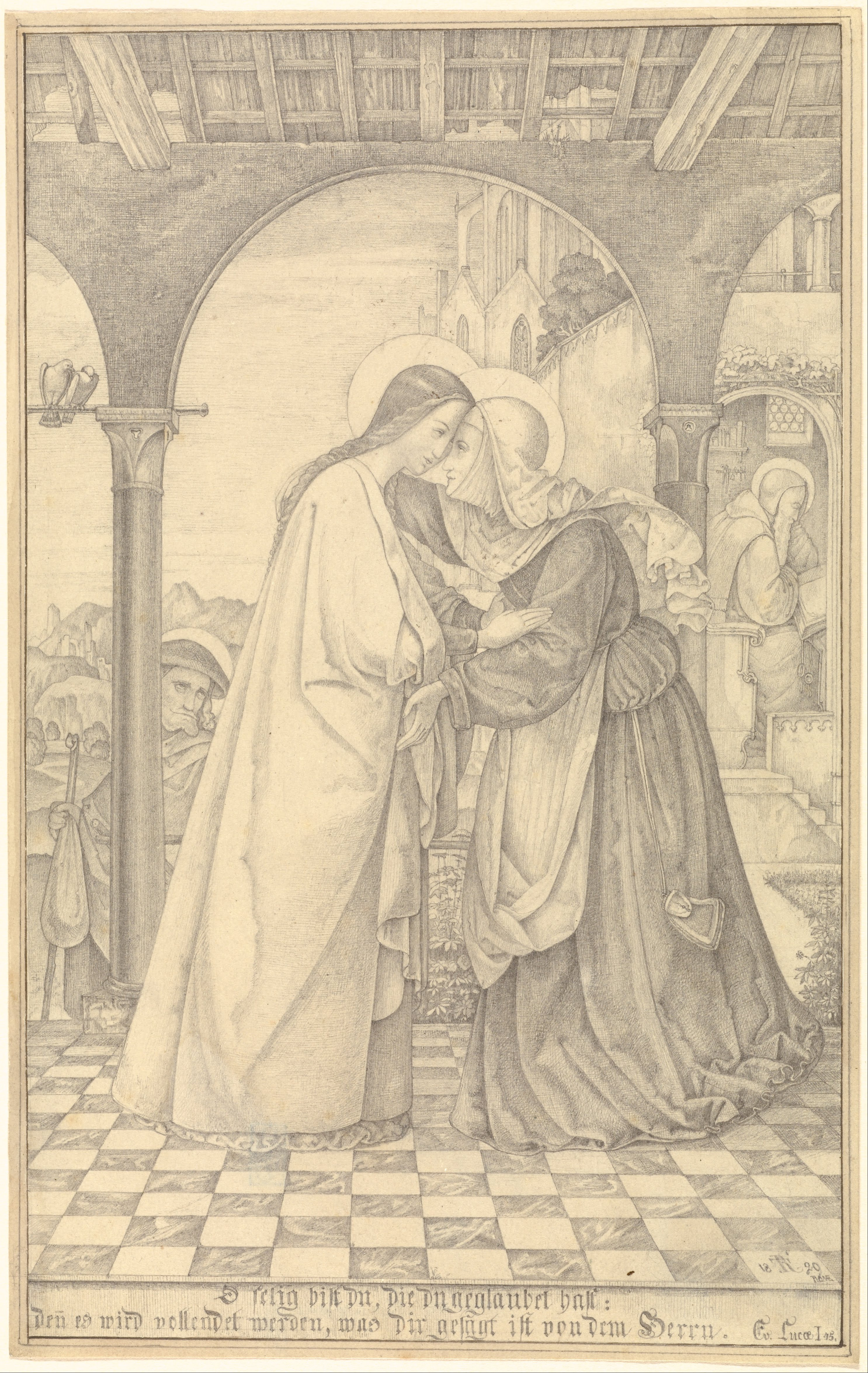
The Visitation (1820)

Theodor Markus Rehbenitz (2 September 1791, Borstel - 19 February 1861, Kiel) was a German painter and draftsman, associated with the Nazarene movement.

== Life and work ==
He was born on an estate where his father served as the Superintendent. After receiving instruction from the local Rector, he attended the Katharineum in Lübeck. When his father died in 1810 the Bürgermeister of Bad Oldesloe became his guardian. The following year, he became a law student at the University of Kiel, then moved to the University of Heidelberg. While there, he was able to see the collection of paintings amassed by Sulpiz Boisserée and his brother Melchior, which had recently been put on display. This inspired him to give up law and become a history painter. He entered the Academy of Fine Arts, Vienna, in 1813.

=== In Italy ===
In 1816, he took the traditional study trip to Rome. As his sister Augusta had recently married Friedrich Overbeck's brother Christian Gerhard, he found quick entry into the inner circles of the Nazareners even though, unlike most of them, he remained a Protestant. He travelled extensively throughout Italy for many years. In 1819, he established a communal studio with Julius Schnorr von Carolsfeld and Friedrich von Olivier in the Palazzo Caffarelli near the Capitoline Hill. He was a notoriously slow worker, however, and a major commission that was not completed in time hastened his departure. The Summer of 1823 was spent in Florence and Pisa, following which he went to Perugia, where he stayed until 1827. From 1828 to 1831, he worked in the offices of the Prussian Envoy, Christian Charles Josias von Bunsen. Very few works survive from his Italian period.

He moved to Lübeck in 1832, working primarily as a portrait painter. From 1835 to 1841, he lived in Munich and once again became involved in a communal enterprise with Carolsfeld and the Olivier brothers. There, he worked mainly on religious themes and a series of self-portraits. After another short stay in Lübeck, he was hired as an instructor by the University of Kiel, a position that included managing the university's art collection. He became a member of the Kiel Art Association and was on the board of the Gesellschaft zur Sammlung und Erhaltung vaterländischer Alterthümer (a society for the preservation of German antiquities). He died after a long illness.

The Rehbenitzwinkel (mall) in Kiel is named after him.
