= Johann Daniel Overbeck =

German librarian and theologian

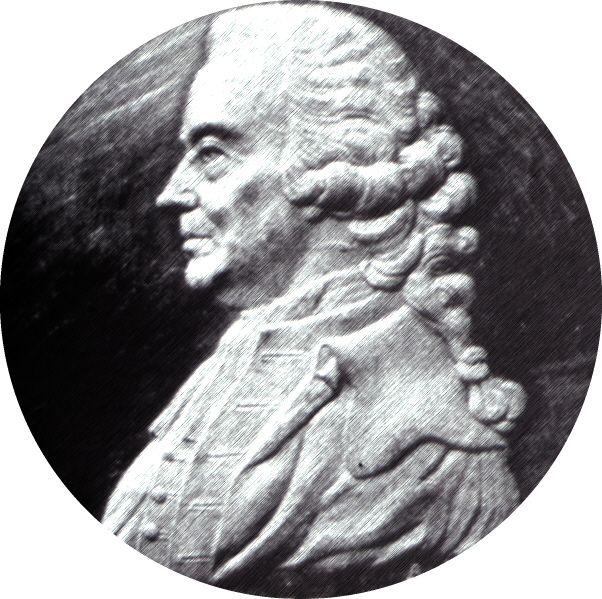
Johann Daniel Overbeck; medal by Abraham Aaron (1793)

Johann Daniel Overbeck (23 June 1715, Rethem - 3 August 1802, in Lübeck) was an evangelical theologian and Rector at the Katharineum.

== Biography ==
He was the son of the Superintendent, Caspar Nicolaus Overbeck. He and his two brothers attended the Michaelisschule in Lüneburg. His parents could not afford the fees for all three sons to continue their education, so he was already working as a tutor while attending the Katharineum. In 1734, he began studying theology at the University of Helmstedt, where Johann Lorenz von Mosheim hired him as a private tutor to help defray his tuition.

In 1743, he became a Konrektor (Vice-Principal) in Quedlinburg. He had held that position for only a year, when he succeeded Johann Friedrich Behrendt as Subrektor at the Katharineum. Managing the City Library was among his official duties. In 1753, he became the Konrektor there and, ten years later, succeeded Johann Henrich von Seelen as Rector. He held that position until his retirement in 1795.

In 1754, he married Charlotte Chüden (1725-1802), second daughter of the Court Physician, Christian Friedrich Chüden (1686-1747). They had two daughters and a son, of which only the youngest daughter survived.

He never acknowledged the changes brought about by the Enlightenment, either personally or professionally, so the Katharineum's prestige had reached a low point by the end of the 18th century. He himself remained highly respected. The University of Kiel awarded him an honorary Doctorate in 1793.

The poet and Bürgermeister of Lübeck, Christian Adolph Overbeck, was his nephew.

== Sources ==
- Christian Adolph Overbeck: Leben Herrn Johann Daniel Overbecks, weyland Doctors der Theologie und Rectors des Lübeckischen Gymnasiums. Von einem nahen Verwandten, und vormaligen Schüler des Verewigten. Lübeck: Römhild, 1803
- Alken Bruns: "Johann Daniel Overbeck". In: Lübecker Lebensläufe, Neumünster 1993, pp.290–292. ISBN 3-529-02729-4
- "Overbeck (Johann Daniel)" in: Johann Samuel Ersch, Johann Gottfried Gruber, Moritz Hermann Eduard Meier, Hermann Brockhaus, Johann Georg Heinrich Hassel, A. G. Müller, August Leskien, Allgemeine Encyclopädie der Wissenschaften und Künste, Vol.3, 1836, pp.32–36
- Uwe Meier (1999). "Overbeck, Christian Adolph". Neue Deutsche Biographie (in German). Vol. 19. Berlin: Duncker & Humblot. pp. 720–721. (full text online). (Nebeneintrag im Artikel zu Christian Adolph Overbeck)
- Isabel Sellheim: "Die Familie des Malers Friedrich Overbeck (1789–1869) in genealogischen Übersichten". In: Deutsches Familienarchiv. Vol. 104, Neustadt an der Aisch 1989, ISBN 3-7686-5091-X, GW ISSN 0012-1266
