= Hamburg Citizen Militia =

Hamburg Citizen Militia Hamburger Bürgermilitär
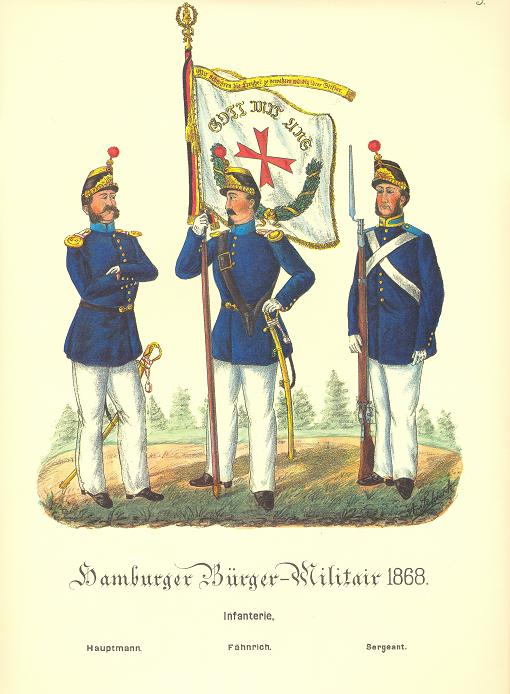
- Uniforms of the infantry in 1886, published by Adolph Schieck in Das Hamburgische Bürgermilitär im Jahre 1868
- Active: 1814–1868
- Disbanded: 1868
- Country: Hamburg
- Type: Citizen militia
- Role: Guarding Hamburg
- Size: 8,500 (1858)
- Engagements: No

Insignia
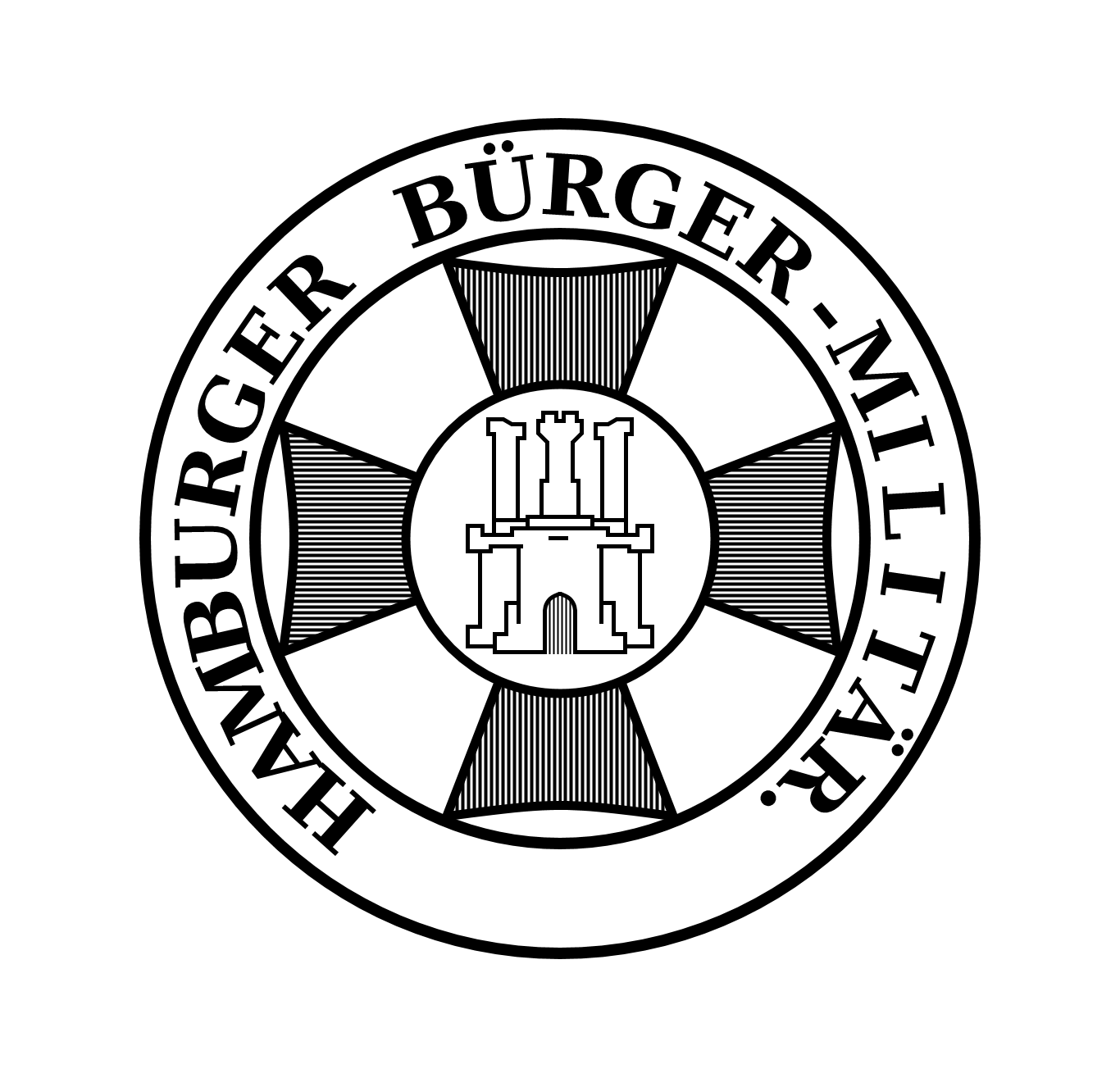
- Seal

The Hamburg Citizen Militia (German: Hamburger Bürgermilitär) or Hanseatic Citizen Guard (German: Hanseatische Bürgergarde) was a citizen militia of the Free and Hanseatic City of Hamburg, formed from conscripted citizens and inhabitants of the city. It was formed in 1814 and dissolved in 1868.

The Hamburg Citizen Militia should not be confused with the Hanseatic Legion (German: Hanseatische Legion). During their time of coexistence, the militia restricted itself to ejecting the French garrisons of Hamburg and the other Hanseatic League cities, whereas the Legion also participated in the rest of the campaign.

== History ==
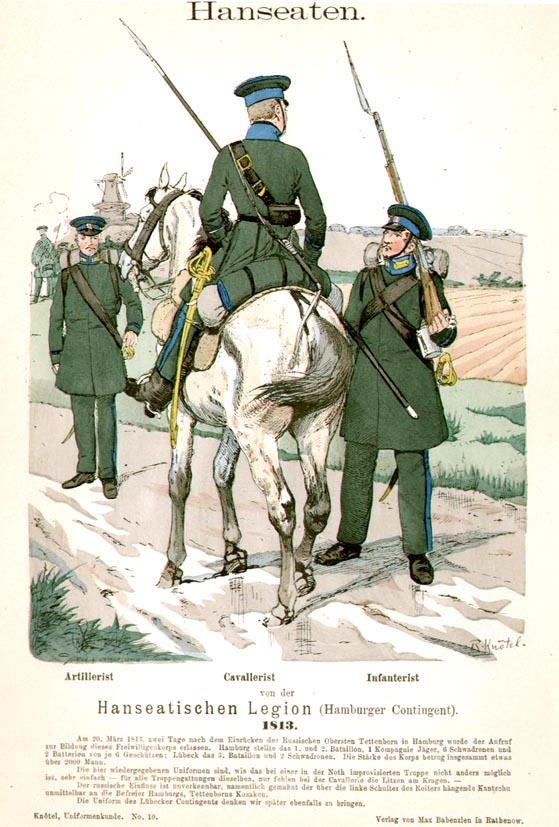
Hanseaten. Hamburg contingent of the Hanseatic Legion and Hamburg Citizen Militia. 1813–14

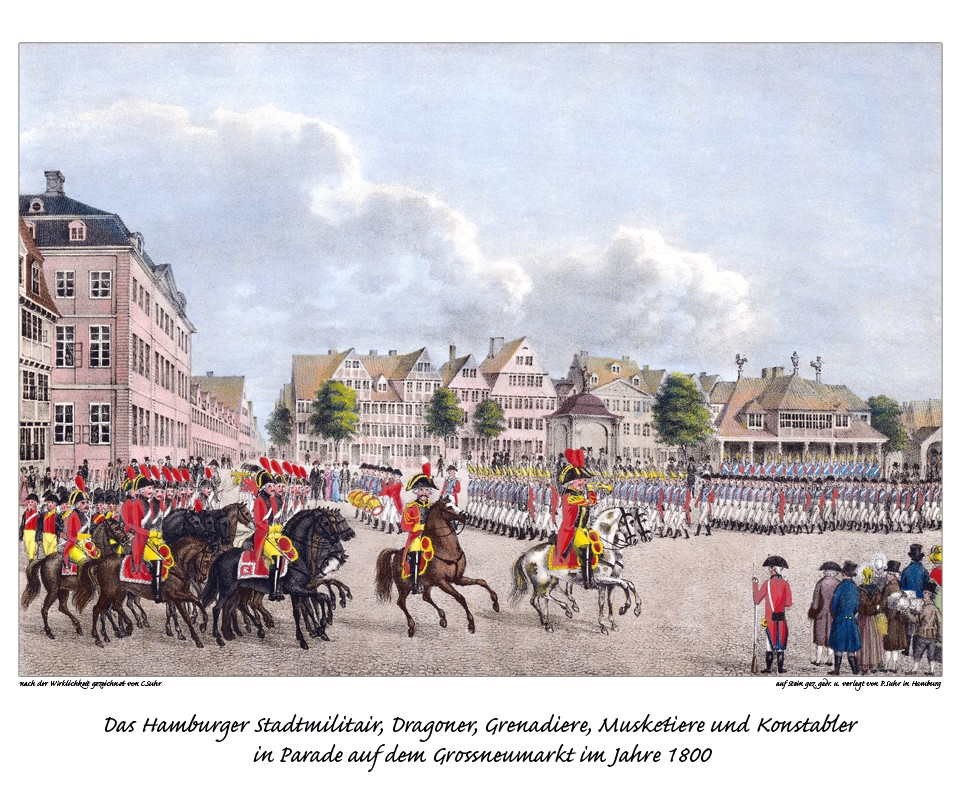
The Hamburg Military—dragoons, grenadiers, musketeers, and constables—parading in Hamburg in 1800.

Since the late 12th century, Hamburg had military sovereignty (German: Wehrhoheit)—the right and the duty to defend itself— and used this for the first time in 1394 to conquer the fortress of Ritzebüttel—since 1926 part of Cuxhaven. During the decades before the Thirty Years' War (1618–1648), Hamburg had 50 to 100 men under arms.

The Bürgerwache or Bürgergarde (lit. citizen watch) was established around the beginning of the Thirty Years' War, and around 7,000 men (in 1617) were organized 19 companies, since 1619 in 4 battalions. The duties of the citizen watch included the defense of the city, to extinguish fires and general policing tasks. The men were conscripted, with exceptions only for holders of special offices or other privileged persons. During the 17th century the citizen watch was so undisciplined, that its tasks were to watch the fortification at night and to build fortifications only.

From 1810 to 1814 Hamburg was annexed by Napoleon. During the occupation, the Bouches-de-l'Elbe department formed the 127th Infantry Regiment, which was annihilated in the War of the Sixth Coalition (1812–14). The city was besieged for over a year by Allied forces (mostly Russian, Swedish and German). Russian forces under General Bennigsen finally freed the city in 1814.

From 1814 to 1866 Hamburg was a sovereign country (like United Kingdom of Great Britain and Ireland, the Kingdom of France or Prussia) and member of the German Confederation. The citizen watch and the citizen militia coexisted until Hamburg lost its military sovereignty in 1867, and the Infantry Regiment No. 76 of the Prussian army's 17th Division was garrisoned in Hamburg.

On 15 January 1815 the first parade of the militia was held in Hamburg, with 2000 men. This date is considered as the anniversary of the militia and was celebrated every year with a feast of the officers corps or a parade. In 1815 the militia consisted of 4000 men infantry, 300 riflemen, 300 men artillery, and 100 cavalry, serving in the 6 city battalions, the 7th battalion in St Georg, and the 10th battalion in Ritzebüttel. In 1837 the 8th battalion St. Pauli was established.

== Organization ==
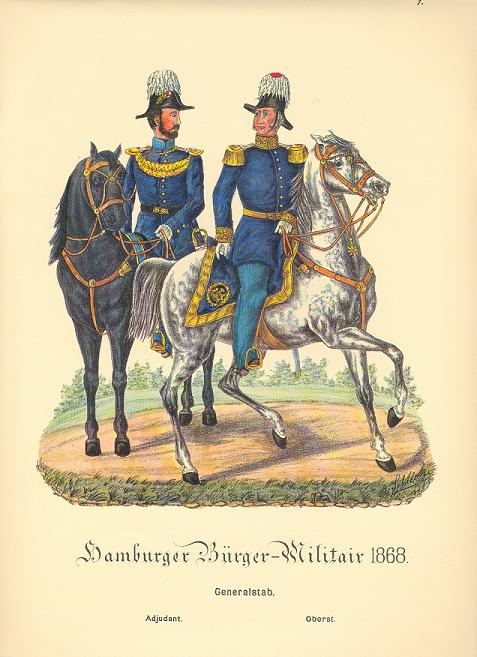
Uniforms of the general staff in 1886, published by Adolph Schieck in Das Hamburgische Bürgermilitär im Jahre 1868

A commission—consisting of the oldest mayor of Hamburg, 2 senators, the city commander, the head of the militia, and 6 citizens—was the oversight authority and link between the government and the militia. Without an order of the commission, the militia could not be alarmed or commanded for any duty. The commission decided in case of suspensions for conscripted citizens, on the budget of the militia, and elected the majors and captains for the militia. Lieutenants and first lieutenants were selected by another commission. The commission had not the authority for general amendments of the regulations, this was a task of the Senate of Hamburg.

4 majors and their 4 adjutants supported the head of the militia (an Oberstleutnant and since 1840 an Oberst) as the general staff. The battalions were headed by a major, and a captain was commander of a company.

In 1814, 10 infantry battalions were planned, a battalion of 4 companies of riflemen, a corps of 2 artillery companies, and a cavalry corps with 2 squadrons. Of the 10 infantry battalions, 6 should be established in the city of Hamburg, the 7th battalion was of St. Georg, Barmbek, Hamm, and Horn. The 8th battalions should be established in Billwerder, Ochsenwerder, and Finkenwerder, the 9th in St. Pauli, and the 10th in Ritzebüttel (now Cuxhaven). The 6 city battalions, the 7th and the 10th battalion, and cavalry, artillery, and riflemen were established first. The 8th battalion was never fully established.

== Social structure ==
The Hamburg Citizen Militia was not garrisoned and conscripted—every citizen and inhabitants of the city and theirs sons were bound to serve—nevertheless the conscription could be eluded with financing a substitute. Several occupational groups were excluded from the militia, among others priests, public teachers, physicians, bailiffs, members of the night watch and the police. Members of the Senate were also free of the service in the militia. Because of the election of the officers by commissions close to the militia, the selection of the officer corps was separated from external influences. The duty regulations of 1814 emphasized, that the soldiers were citizens, and at the beginning patriotism and enthusiasm filled the ranks of the militia, although the level of the officers corps sunk in the 1830s. Older officers resigned and new officers were either inexperienced, young or with low education, who often could not write.

== See also ==
- Hanseatic Legion
