= Erich Gutenberg =

German economist

- Born: 13 December 1897
- Died: 22 May 1984 (aged 86)

Academic work
- Discipline: Business administration, Microeconomics
- Notable ideas: Theory of the firm

Erich Gutenberg (13 December 1897 in Herford – 22 May 1984 in Cologne) was an influential German economist.

He is considered the founder of modern German business studies after World War II. Gutenberg used microeconomy to explain the functioning of the enterprise. Therefore, he also developed a new production function. With a system of inputs and outputs under management control he explained how a firm could be efficient.

He received his Ph.D. from the University of Halle in 1921 and subsequently taught as a professor at the Friedrich Schiller University of Jena, the Johann Wolfgang Goethe University of Frankfurt am Main, and the University of Cologne.
