= Deutsche Leasing =

German leasing company

Deutsche Leasing AG
- Company type: Aktiengesellschaft
- Industry: Leasing
- Founded: January 10, 1962
- Headquarters: Bad Homburg vor der Höhe, Deutschland
- Key people: Kai Ostermann (Chief executive officer), other executive members: Sonja Kardorf, David Gerstner, Thomas Söhlke, Markus Strehle; Alexander Wüerst (Chairman of the Supervisory Board)
- Number of employees: 3,162
- Website: deutsche-leasing.com

Deutsche Leasing AG (DL) is a manufacturer-independent leasing company in Germany. Since 1987, the company has had its headquarters in Bad Homburg vor der Höhe and is the main leasing partner for the Sparkassen-Finanzgruppe. Shares are held by approximately 350 Sparkassen (savings banks), either directly or indirectly through holding companies. Deutsche Leasing is the sole shareholder of Deutsche Anlagen-Leasing in Wiesbaden. It operates in the field of financing, particularly for small and medium-sized enterprises (SMEs), and finances, among other things, real estate, machinery, vehicles, and IT projects.

== History ==
=== Foundation and first decades ===
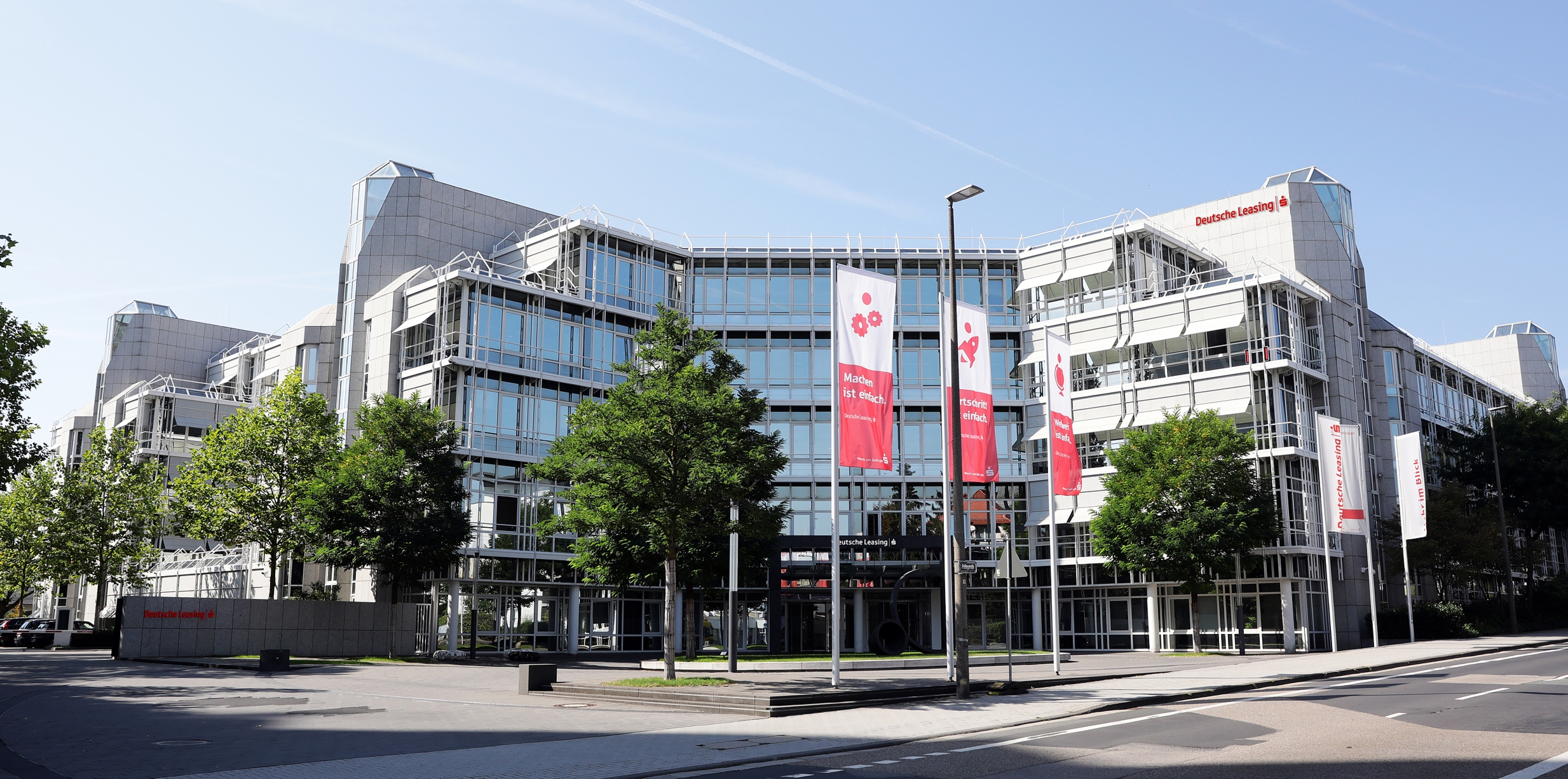
Deutsche Leasing at Bad Homburg

Deutsche Leasing GmbH, among Germany's first leasing companies, was entered in the Commercial Register in Düsseldorf on January 10, 1962. The two other predecessor companies of Deutsche Leasing were Maschinen-Miete GmbH and Mietdienst GmbH, which were founded in 1962 and 1963 respectively. In 1971, these three companies merged to form Deutsche Leasing AG. Until 1991 the founder of Maschinen-Miete GmbH, Albrecht Dietz, was Chairman of the Board of the new company.

In 1970, the company founded the subsidiary Deutsche Auto-Leasing GmbH, which introduced leasing for private individuals for the first time in Germany from 1975. The founding of LGS Leasinggesellschaft der Sparkasse GmbH in 1982 enabled the company to integrate its leasing offer into the financing offer of the savings banks. In April 1987, Deutsche Leasing moved into its administrative building in Bad Homburg vor der Höhe.

=== Expansion and Internationalization ===
The first foreign company was founded in Italy in 1993, followed by further companies in Hungary, the Czech Republic and France. In 1995, Deutsche Leasing AG became a partner of the Sparkassen-Finanzgruppe. Two years later, the company founded the subsidiary Polski Leasing Przemyslowy S.A. in Warsaw, Poland. A French subsidiary commenced operations in 1999 under the name Deutsche Immobilien Leasing GmbH (DIL), thereby expanding its range of services to include real estate leasing business. In addition, savings banks acquired the shares of Deutsche Leasing from several Landesbanken, Hamburger Sparkasse and Landesgirokasse Stuttgart via holding companies at a price of DM635 million. Deutsche Leasing began a cooperation with a partner company in Russia and founded Deutsche Leasing Vostok.

In 2002, the company founded further subsidiaries in Spain and Slovakia and a subsidiary in England in the following year. Deutsche Leasing entered into a partnership with the European Investment Fund (EIF) in 2004, through which projects in areas of sustainability and new technologies in European countries have since been financed with funds amounting to billions of euros.

With the acquisition of the majority of shares in Anlagen- und Grundstückvermietgesellschaft mbH & Co. the majority of the shares in Anlagen- und Grundstücksvermietungsgesellschaft mbH & Co. KG (AGV) and Deutsche Anlagen-Leasing GmbH & Co. KG (DAL) in 2005, Deutsche Leasing expanded its offering in the real estate sector. In 2008, leasing companies were placed under the supervision of the Financial Market Authority in Germany. In 2009, Deutsche Leasing opened branches in Austria, the Netherlands, and the Benelux countries. This was followed by the establishment of further companies in Sweden, Ireland, Portugal, and Brazil by 2012.

=== Recent Developments ===
In 2012, Deutsche Leasing took over Universal Factoring. This was followed by the acquisition of a majority stake in Deutsche Factoring Bank in 2016.

Deutsche Leasing's net profit for the 2019/2020 financial year fell by 56% from €87 million to €38 million, but in 2020/2021 the annual result returned to the pre-Covid-19 period.

In response to the Russian invasion of Ukraine, the company stopped new business in Russia at the beginning of March 2023 and eventually sold its Russian subsidiary.

In June 2023, Deutsche Leasing was the target of a hacker attack. The company shut down its IT systems for two weeks after the attack was discovered.

== Corporate structure ==
The company's legal form is an Aktiengesellschaft, meaning it is a stock corporation owned by its shareholders, and part of the Sparkassen-Finanzgruppe, and around 350 savings banks are shareholders through their association. The Deutsche Leasing Group is represented by its business segments and its subsidiaries DAL Deutsche Anlagen-Leasing GmbH & Co. KG, Deutsche Leasing Finance GmbH and Vent.io GmbH, the subsidiary Deutsche Factoring Bank GmbH & Co. KG as well as other investments focused on the asset finance and asset service segment. The company has subsidiaries in 20 different countries in Europe, Asia, and America. The company's focus is business-to-business with middle-sized companies. According to the Frankfurter Allgemeine Zeitung, Deutsche Leasing plays a "central role" for Germany's SME sector as a leasing partner. The company's total assets amounted to €24.5 billion in the 2024/25 financial year.

Deutsche Leasing uses the savings bank business as a sales channel, where the savings banks can access Deutsche Leasing's offerings and offer them to their customers. The company also has a direct business, which enables it to offer its products and services beyond the circle of savings bank customers. Finally, the partner business is another sales channel through cooperation with dealers and vendors.

=== Subsidiaries and investments ===
- Deutsche Anlagen-Leasing GmbH & Co. KG: offers financing for real estate, transportation, logistics, medical technology, IT business and financing solutions for intangible assets and current assets. The company is also responsible for the group's renewable energy projects, including the generation and storage of energy.
- Deutsche Leasing Insurance Services GmbH: is responsible for the Group's insurance business.
- Deutsche Leasing Finance GmbH: offers asset-related credit financing, in particular investment loans and dealer purchase financing. The financing can be applied for through the Sparkassen and, due to the direct integration, approved without additional documents or waiting times.
- Deutsche Factoring Bank GmbH & Co. KG: is responsible for factoring.
- Bad Homburger Inkasso GmbH: is active in the areas of bad debts and realization of collateral. Various municipal administrations use the debt collection service.
- S-Kreditpartner GmbH: submits offers for private car and consumer loans.
- Vent.io: deals with the evaluation of machine data with regard to factors such as capacity utilization and wear and tear for financing advice

== Products ==
Deutsche Leasing's first leasing object and the first leasable investment in Germany was a 1962 Sweda cash register. Deutsche Leasing AG offers a range of leasing services, including:

- Machines leasing (agricultural technology, construction equipment, printing presses, plastic manufacturing plant, medical technology, machine tools)
- Vehicle leasing (passenger vehicles, commercial vehicles, vehicle fleets, vehicle trading)
- IT and communications leasing (hardware leasing, software leasing, software project leasing)
- Energy development leasing (for example, renewable energy, power stations, heating systems)
- Real estate leasing
