= Katharineum =

Coordinates: 53°52′08″N 10°41′21″E

Katharineum zu Lübeck
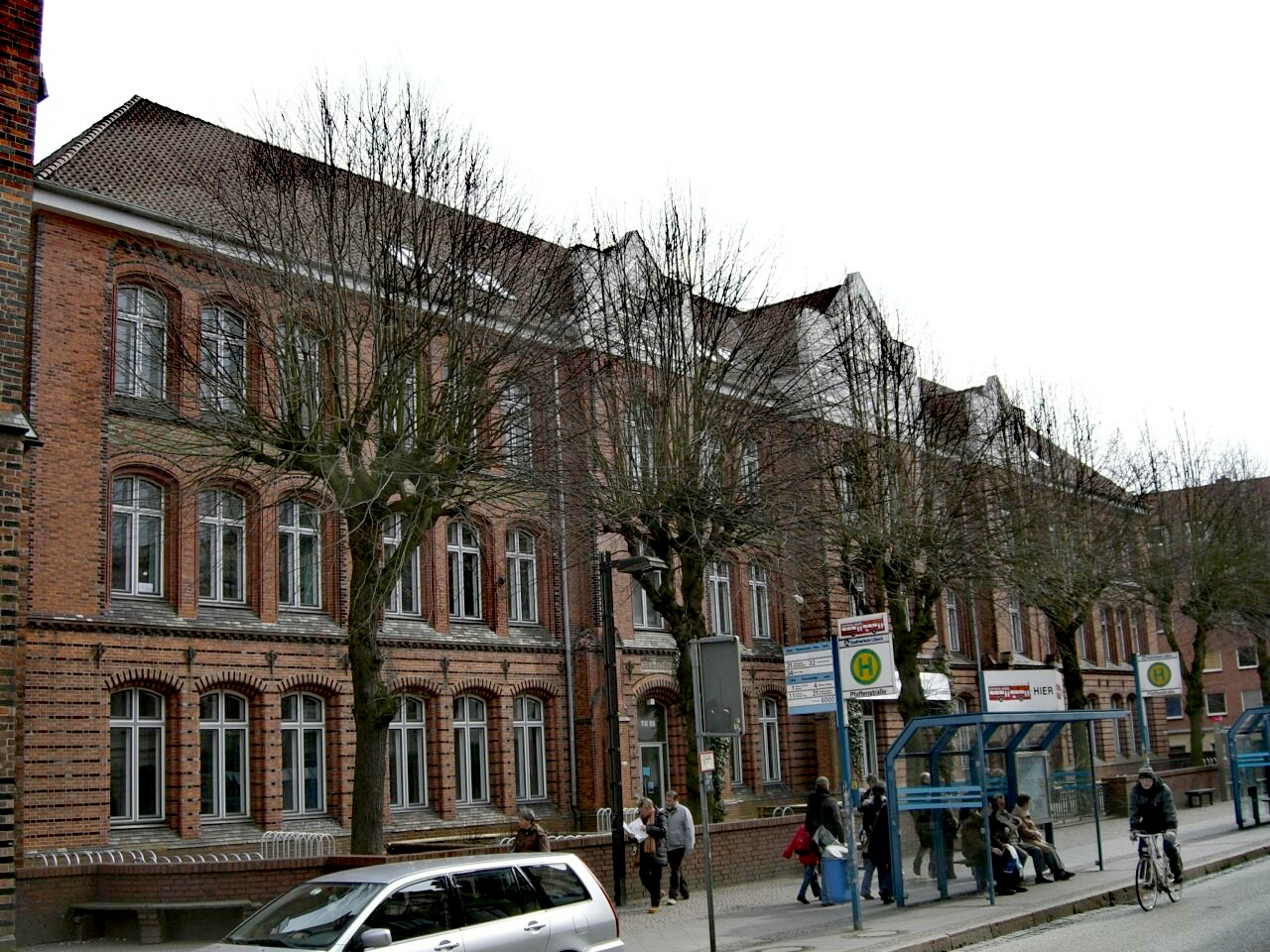
- Königstr. 27-31; D-23552 Lübeck; Schleswig-Holstein; Germany

Information
- Type: Public latin school
- Established: 1531; 495 years ago
- Principal: Stefan Phillipi
- Enrollment: 910
- Colors: Black and white
- Website: http://www.katharineum.de

The Katharineum zu Lübeck is a humanistic gymnasium founded 1531 in the Hanseatic city Lübeck, Germany. In 2006 the 475th anniversary of this Latin school was celebrated with several events. The school uses the buildings of a former Franciscan monastery next to Saint Catherine Church, which was extended in the 1880s.

At the Katharineum it is possible to choose Latin as the first foreign language. In year nine it is also possible to choose ancient Greek as the third foreign language.

Thomas Mann, himself a student of the Katharineum, thought of this school when describing the school Hanno went to in the Buddenbrooks. Mann, who as a bad student had to resit two years, made it clear that he disliked the Katharineum by describing both the school and the teachers with strong sarcasm. His brother Heinrich Mann described the school and one infamous teacher in Professor Unrat.

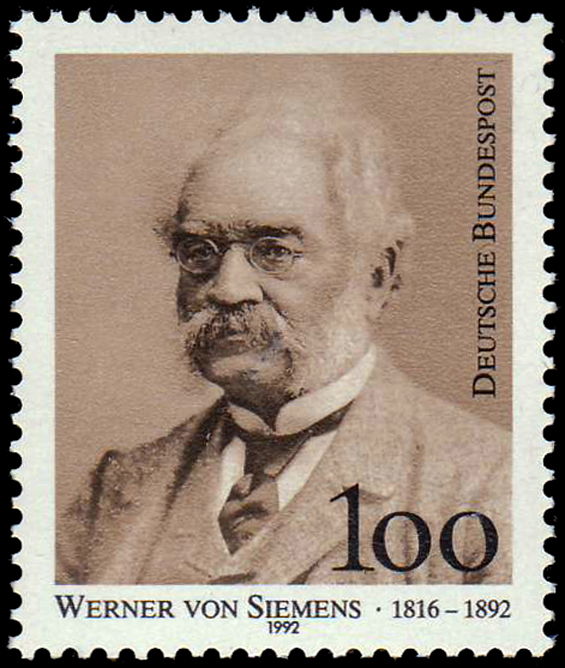
Werner von Siemens

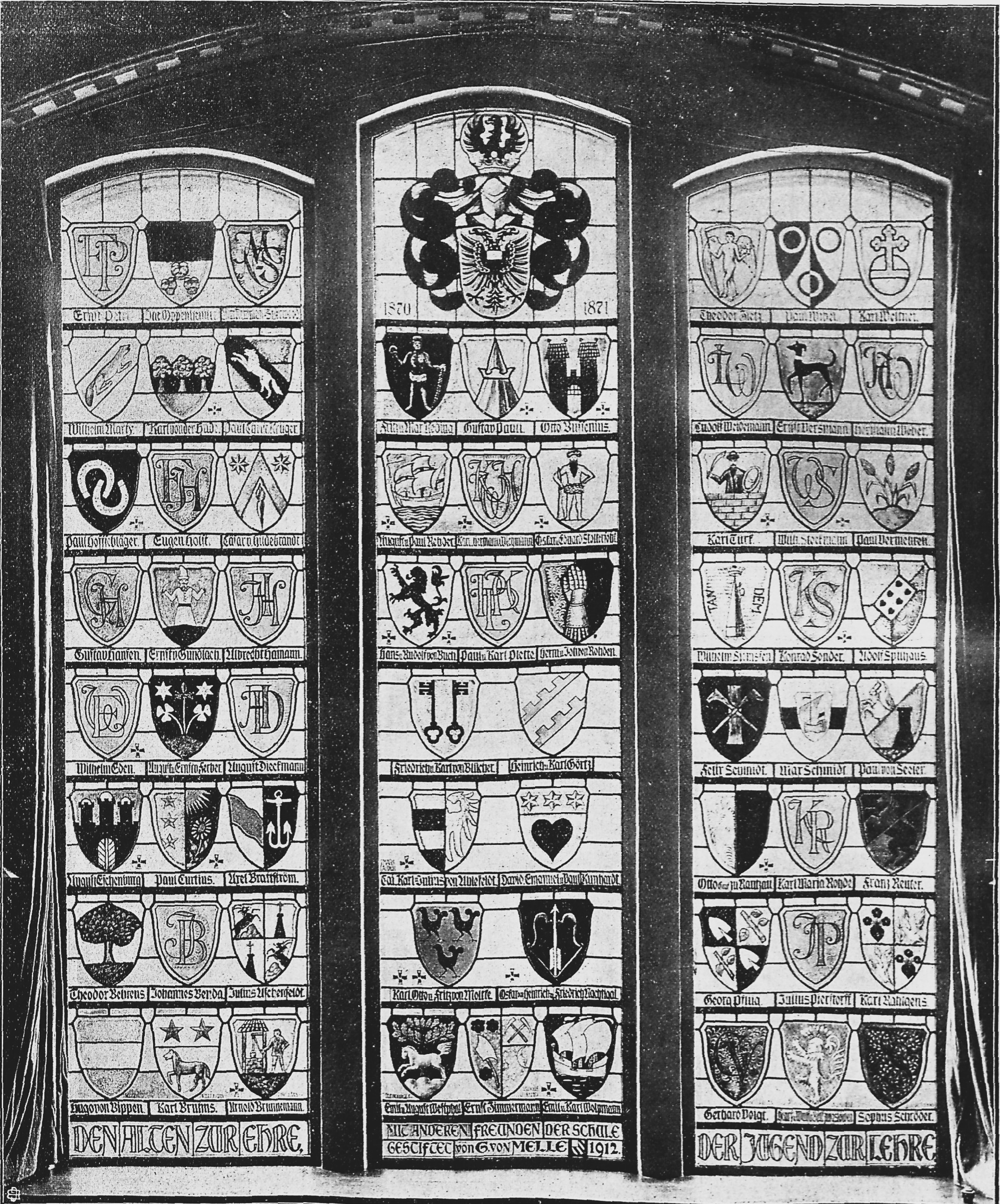
Stained glass

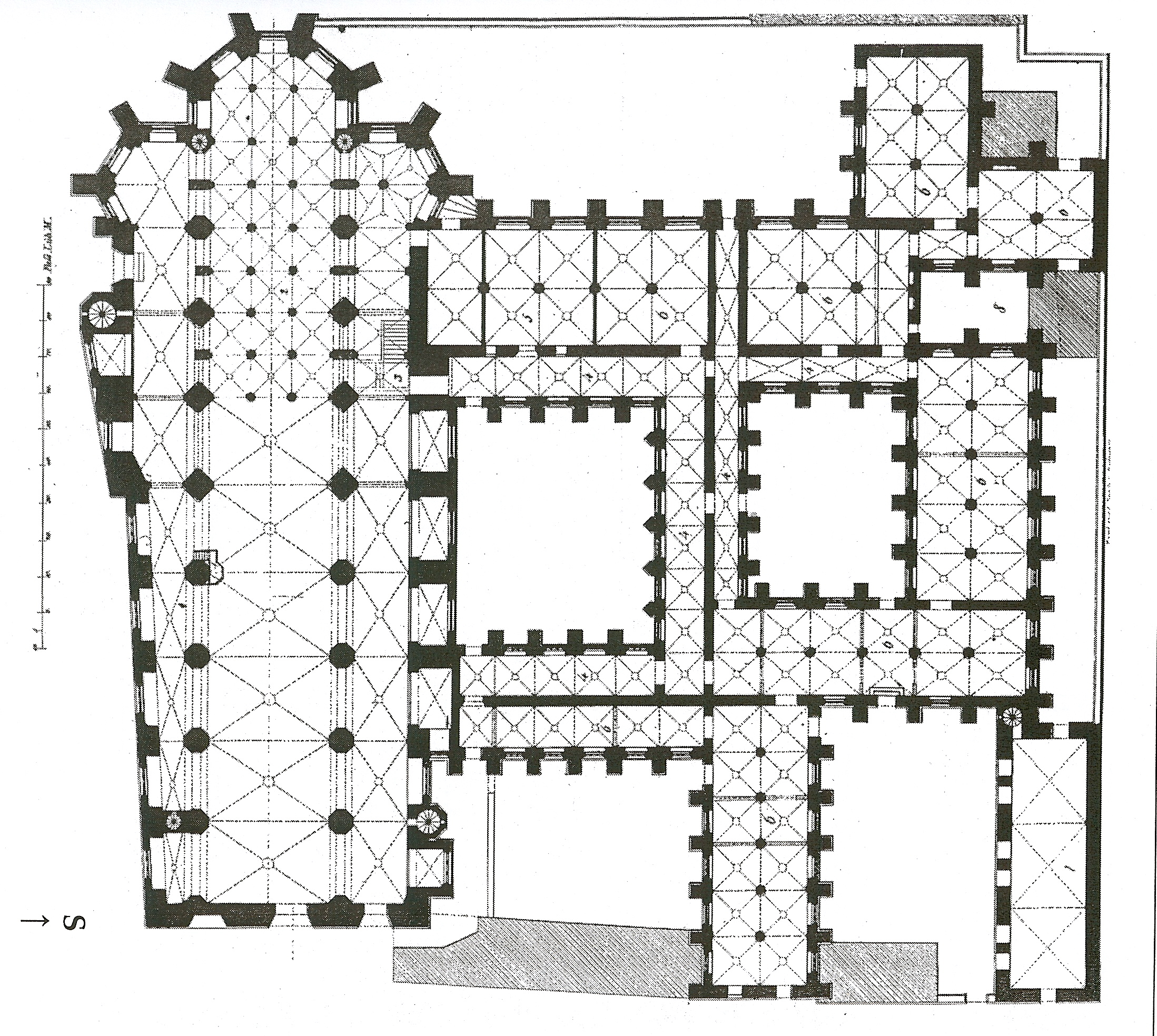
First floor plan of St. Catherine's monastery

== Notable students ==
- Blumenberg, Hans
- Carlebach, Felix
- Carlebach, Joseph
- Geibel, Emanuel
- Graba, Carl Julian
- Mann, Thomas
- Mühsam, Erich
- Overbeck, Friedrich
- Radbruch, Gustav
- Schubring, Walther
- Storm, Theodor
- von Siemens, Werner
