= Old Niendorf Cemetery =

Historic cemetery in Hamburg Germany

Alter Niendorfer Friedhof
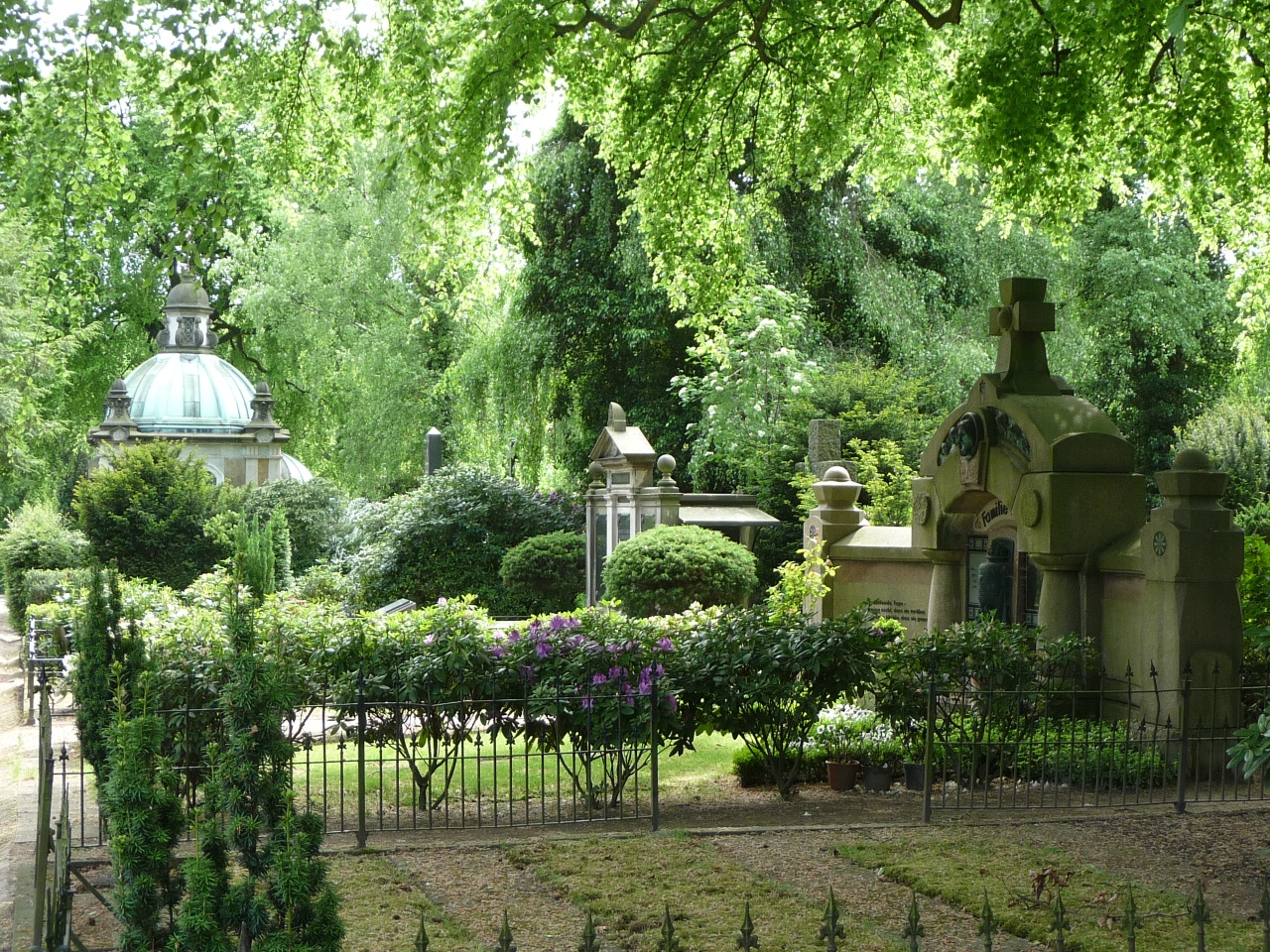

Details
- Established: 1840
- Location: Hamburg
- Country: Germany
- Coordinates: 53°36′58″N 9°56′59″E
- Type: Protestant cemetery
- Owned by: Niendorf Evangelical Lutheran parish
- Size: 4.5 ha
- No. of graves: 2,350
- No. of interments: 6,500
- Website: Official website

The Lutheran Old Niendorf Cemetery (German: Alter Niendorfer Friedhof) is a church-operated historic burial ground in Hamburg, Germany. The cemetery is owned by the Evangelical Lutheran parish church of Niendorf, Hamburg.

== History and description ==
The old cemetery was established in 1840 as a parish burial ground for the baroque church of Niendorf which was built in 1770. The cemetery has a size of approximately 4.5 hectares, on which there are 2,350 graves, where 6,500 people are buried. The cemetery is one of the most historically significant cemeteries in Hamburg. It contains a high number of large family tombs and mausoleums.

== Selected notable burials ==
=== Hanseatic families ===
Notable people buried here include many members of the Hanseatic families of Hamburg, such as

- Several members of the Amsinck family, including
  - Wilhelm Amsinck (1821–1909), businessman and politician
  - Johannes Amsinck, merchant
  - Ludwig Erdwin Amsinck, merchant
  - Martin Garlieb Amsinck, ship-owner
- Several members of the Berenberg/Gossler family, including
  - John von Berenberg-Gossler, banker and senator
  - Baron Cornelius von Berenberg-Gossler, banker
  - Baron Johann ("John") von Berenberg-Gossler, banker
- Several members of the Merck family, including
  - Ernest William Merck, banker
  - Erwin Johannes Merck, banker

=== Other burials ===
- Axel von Ambesser (1910–1988), German actor and film director
- Josef Posipal (1927–1997), Romanian-born German footballer
- Evelyn Hamann (1942–2007), German actress

== Gallery ==
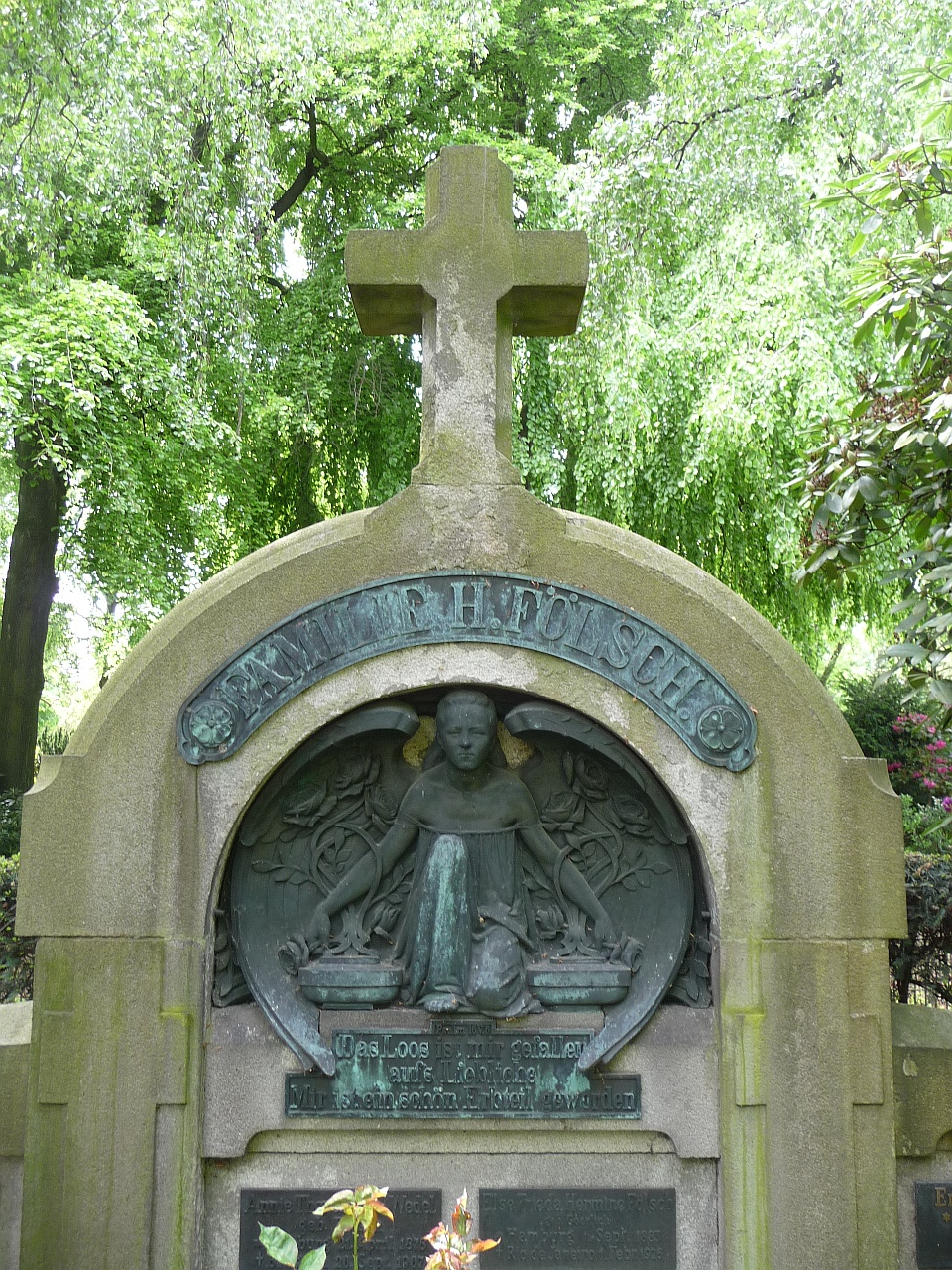

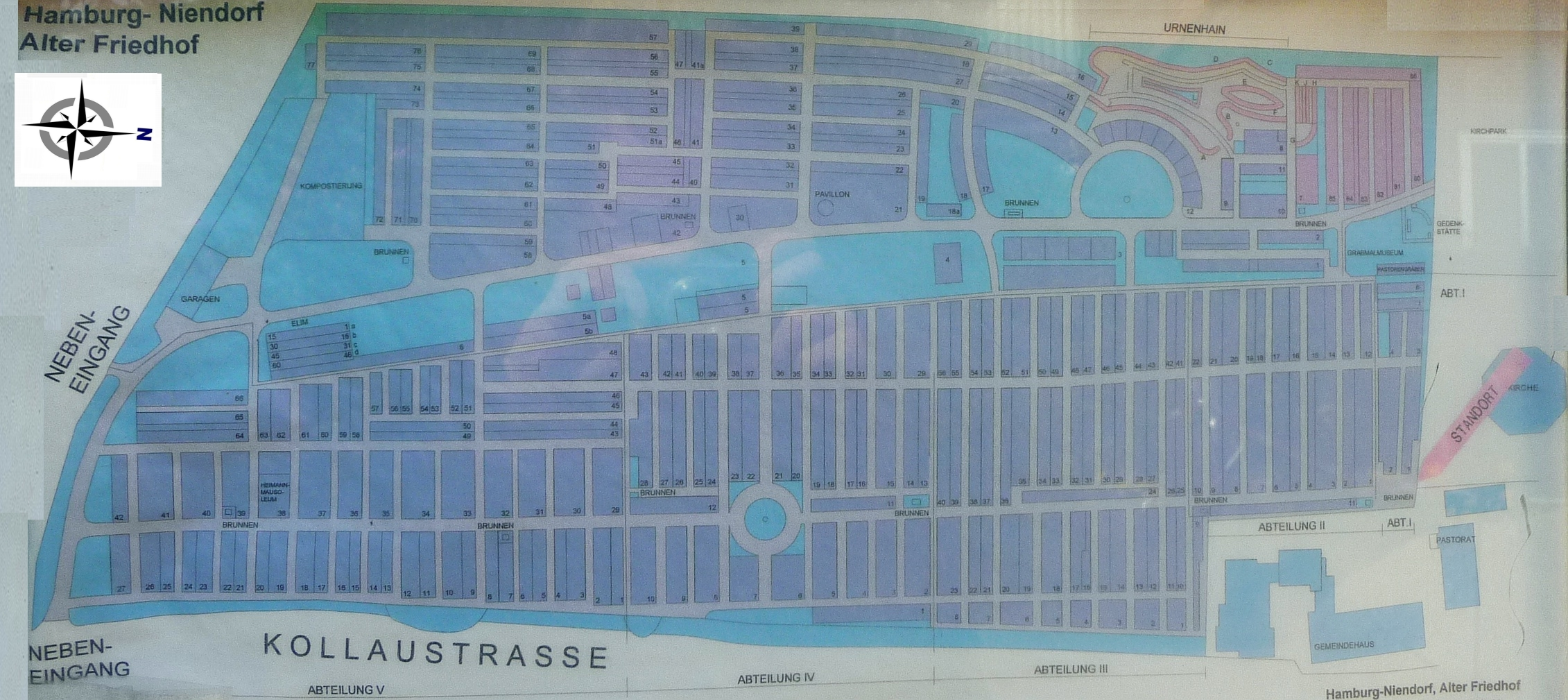
Cemetery map

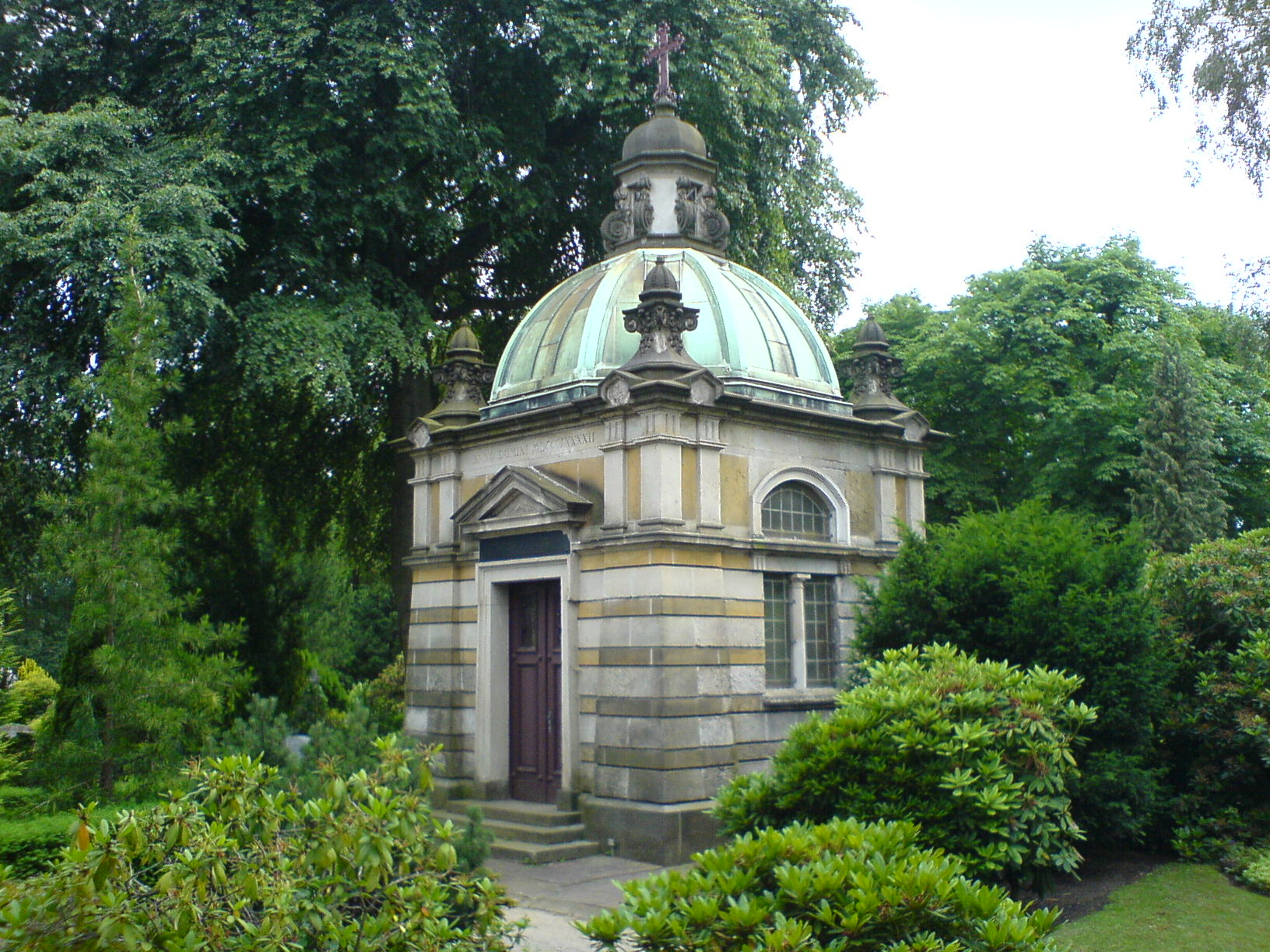
One of the grand mausoleums

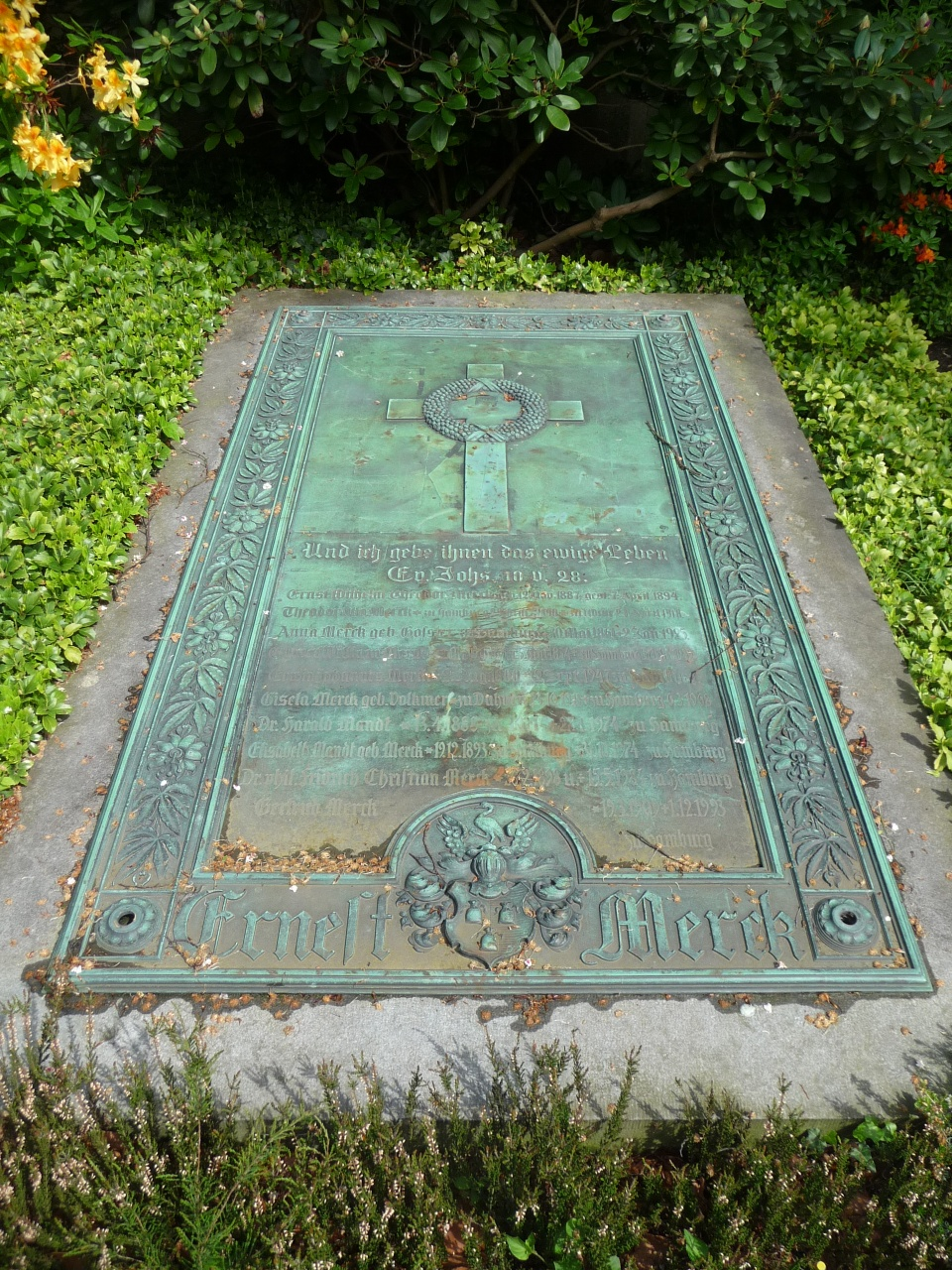

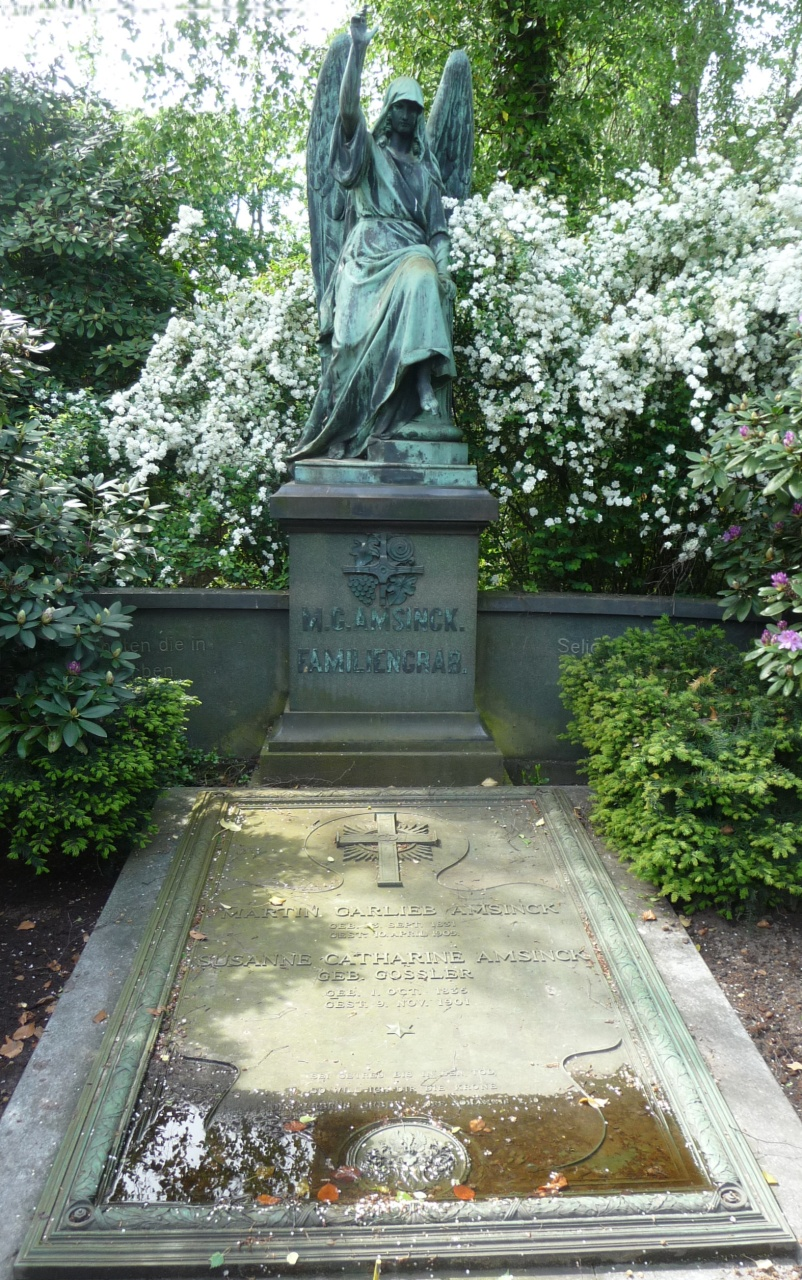

== References and external links ==
- Official website (in German)
