= Dammert =

Dammert is a surname that may refer to:

- Eduardo Dibós Dammert (1898–1987), Peruvian politician
- Johann Ludwig Dammert (1788–1855), First Mayor and President of the Senate of the sovereign city-state of Hamburg
- José Antonio Dammert Bellido (1917–2008), Peruvian Roman Catholic bishop
