= Rudolf Capell =

German historian, linguist and pedagogue

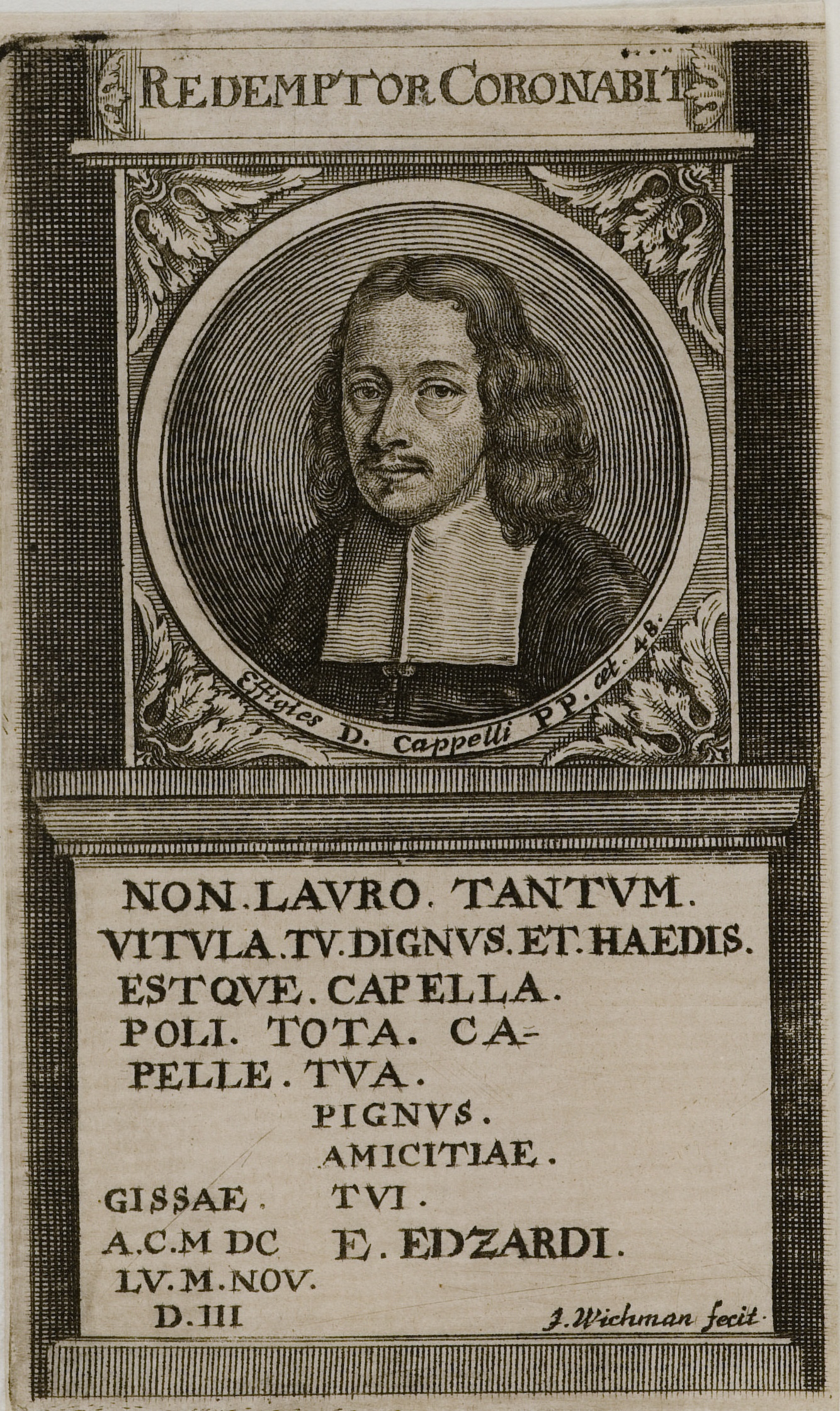

Rudolf Capell (born 24 January 1635 in Hamburg, died 24 April 1684 in Hamburg) was a German historian, linguist and pedagogue. He was renowned internationally as one of the great learned men of his time.

He was the son of Hamburg pastor Jodocus Capell, and attended the University of Wittenberg, the University of Giessen earned the degree of Magister in 1656 and became Professor of Rhetoric at the Akademisches Gymnasium of Hamburg in 1660. In 1675, he became Professor of History and Greek language. He published 97 works on historical and philological topics.

He was married to Anna Berenberg (1639–1669). His daughter Christina Adelheid Capell (1663–1730) was married to Hamburg and Lisbon merchant Paul Amsinck (1649–1706).

== Selected works ==
- Nummophylacium luederianum, antiquum & recentius, Horis Curisque Subcisivis, in Sciagraphia exhibitum & usui accommodatum... Hamburg 1678
