= Martin Garlieb Amsinck =

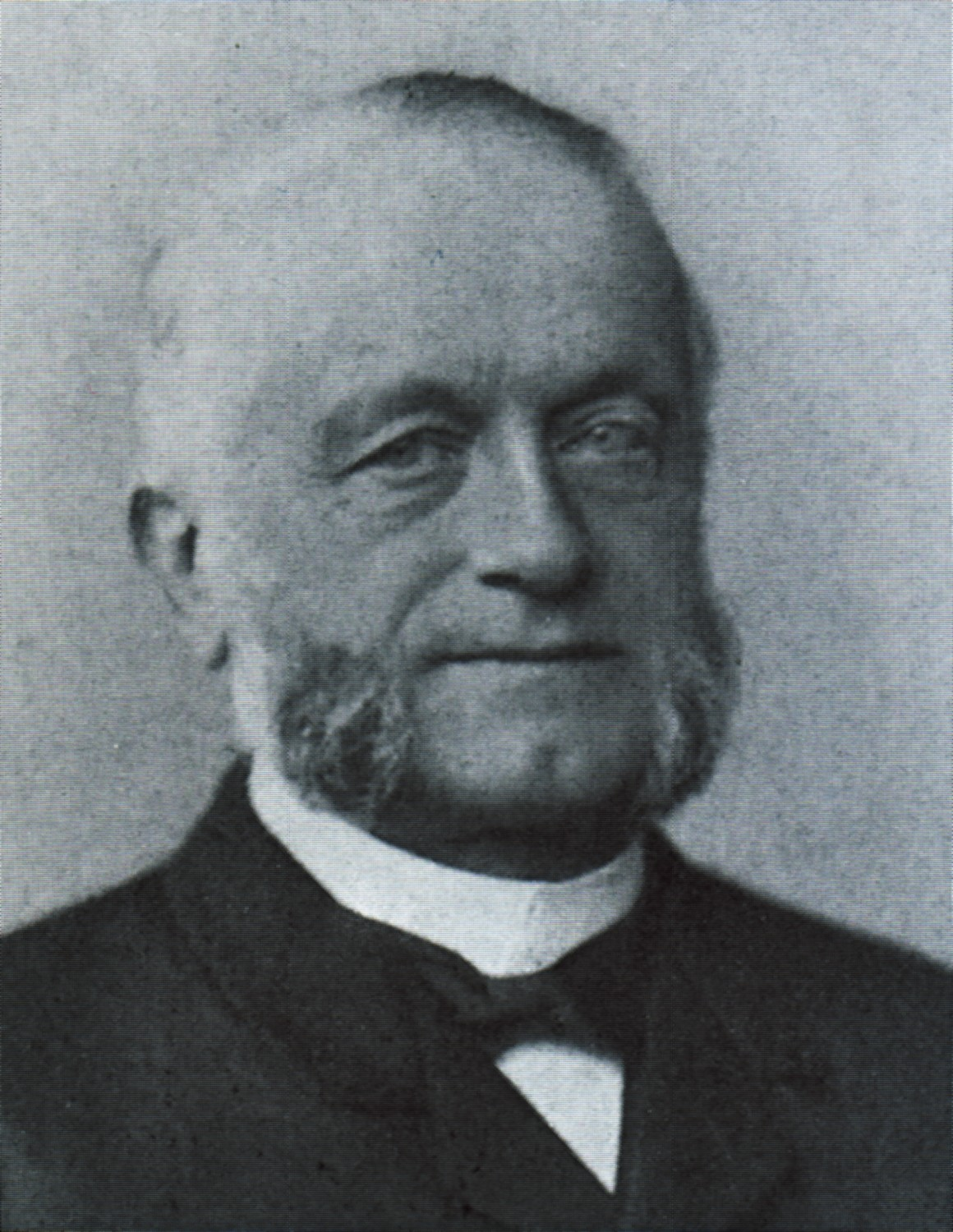
- Born: 23 September 1831; Hamburg
- Died: 10 April 1905 (aged 73); Hamburg
- Occupation: Shipbuilder
- Parent(s): Johannes Amsinck

Martin Garlieb Amsinck (23 September 1831, in Hamburg – 10 April 1905, in Hamburg) was a German shipbuilder and ship-owner. He was one of the major ship-owners of Hamburg. He was a member of Hanseatic Amsinck family and the son of Johannes Amsinck and Emilie Gossler. Unlike his four brothers, he did not join the family company, but started his own shipbuilding company.

== Literature ==
- Renate Hauschild-Thiessen: Amsinck, Martin Garlieb. In: Franklin Kopitzsch, Dirk Brietzke (Hrsg.): Hamburgische Biografie. Personenlexikon. Bd. 2. Wallstein, Göttingen 2003, ISBN 3-7672-1366-4, S. 28–29.
- Paul Schroedter, Gustav Schroedter (Hrsg.): 100 Jahre Schiffahrt, Schiffbau, Häfen. Schiffahrtsverlag Hansa, Hamburg 1964.
- Erik Verg, Martin Verg: Das Abenteuer, das Hamburg heißt. Der weite Weg zur Weltstadt. 4., überarbeitete und ergänzte Auflage. Ellert & Richter, Hamburg 2007, ISBN 978-3-8319-0137-1.
