= David Kindt =

German painter

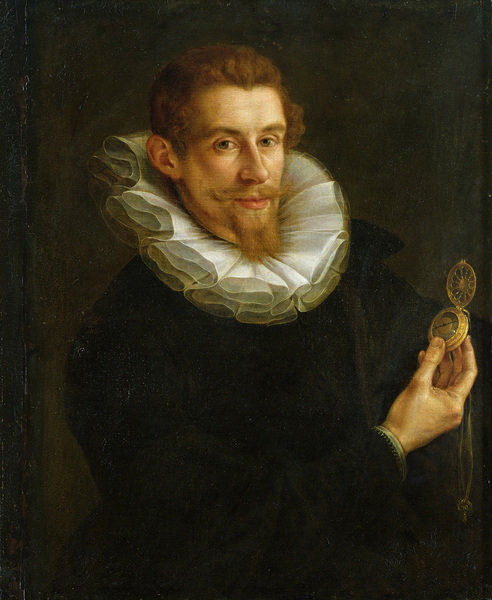
Self-portrait (c. 1604)

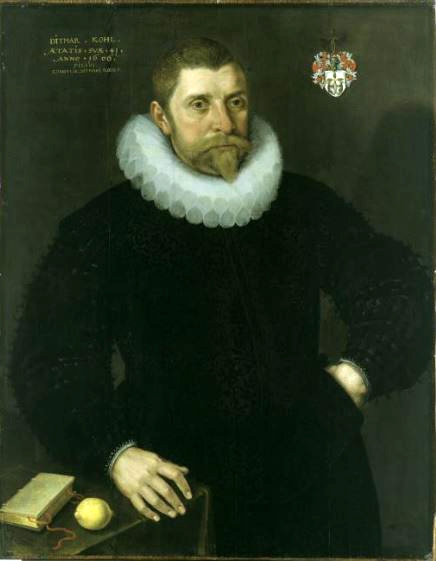
Portrait of Ditmar Koel

David Kindt (1580 – 26 February 1652) was a German painter in the Baroque style, known primarily for portraits and religious works.

== Biography ==
He was born in Hamburg. His father was the painter Johan, or Jan, Kindt (died 1608), who had fled from religious persecution in the Duchy of Brabant. Nothing is known of his childhood or education, although it is presumed that he learned painting from his father, and his early work is in the style of the Flemish Masters. By 1604, he was receiving orders from many of the notable families of Hamburg. The following year, he was given full Bürgerrechte and was married to Anna Lange, daughter of the Procurator fiscal, Johannes Lange. They had nine children, but only two survived into adulthood. One, Hieronymus (1612–1685), also became an artist, but his works have not been identified.

That same year, he was named a Master Of Painting and acquired his first apprentice; a young man named Leonhardt Schers (died 1650/51), about whom nothing is now known. In 1608, Schers broke his contract, resulting in litigation that dragged on until 1621. Kindt must have had a busy workshop, however, as he was able to support two other apprentices: Bastian Kerch, also forgotten, and Conradt (Cordt) Weyer (died 1628), who is known only from his address in municipal documents.

In 1613, he was commissioned to make two maps of the Elbe. The following year saw him involved in a restoration project at the Maria-Magdalenen-Kloster (now the Hospital zum Heiligen Geist), where he worked on two paintings of Adolf IV of Holstein, one showing him in full armor and the other as a monk in a sarcophagus. He became a Bürgerkapitän in the Civil Guard in 1625. Four years later, he became an Ältermann (public spokesman) for the Painter's Guild.

In 1631, he received a commission for four life-size portraits of Frederick III, Duke of Holstein-Gottorp and his wife, Duchess Marie Elisabeth of Saxony, which necessitated spending several months at Schloss Gottorf in Schleswig. He resigned the office of Bürgerkapitän in 1637, and that of Ältermann the following year. He owned several houses in Hamburg; one at what is now the Gerhart-Hauptmann-Platz.

He died in 1652 in Hamburg and was interred at St. Nicholas' Church, which was largely destroyed during World War II. In 1929, a street was named after him in the Barmbek-Nord district.
