= Zimbert Jenisch =

German merchant and patrician

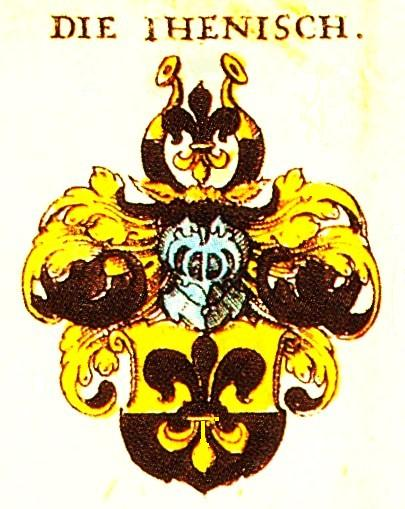
Jenisch coat of arms

Zimbert Jenisch (1587, Augsburg – 28 November 1645, Hamburg) was a German merchant and patrician.

== Background ==
The son of Augsburg council member Melchior Jenisch and Elisabeth Haintzel von Degelstein, Zimbert's mother was a granddaughter of Catharina Welser (1487–1550), who was a sister of Bartholomeus V. Welser and aunt of Philippine Welser.

In 1618 Zimbert became a burgher of Hamburg, and founded the firm Paulus Pütz & Zimbrecht Jenisch with his relatives. The firm became a major import-export firm from the White Sea area in Russia to the Mediterranean.

Married twice, Zimbert's first wife from 1618 was Maria Elisabeth Putz from Stade and after her death from 1635 he remarried to Esther Amsinck, a daughter of Hamburg senator Rudolf Amsinck.

In 1641 he founded the Drondheimbsche Compagnie (Trondheim Company), headquartered in Glückstadt (then in Denmark), that imported fish from Norway to Germany.

== Nobility ==
Zimbert Jenisch was ennobled by Ferdinand II, Holy Roman Emperor in 1629. He didn't use his noble title in the republic of Hamburg, however.

== Literature ==
- Percy Ernst Schramm, "Jenisch, Zimbert", in: Neue Deutsche Biographie, Vol. 10, Berlin 1974, pp. 401–402
