= Johann Ludwig Dammert =

German politician

First Mayor and President of the Senate of the Free and Hanseatic City of Hamburg
- In office 1843–1843

Johann Ludwig Dammert (21 March 1788 – 25 January 1855), was First Mayor and President of the Senate (head of state and head of government) of the sovereign city-state of Hamburg in 1843.

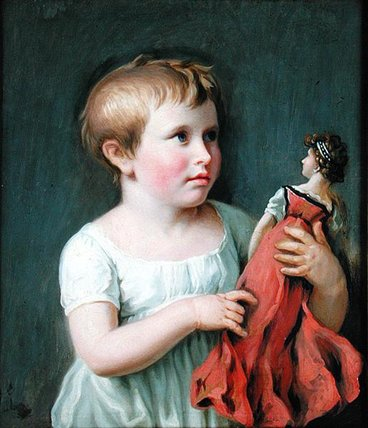
1805 child portrait of his future wife Cornelia Wilhelmine Amsinck, by Tischbein.

== Biography ==
Dammert was born in Hameln. Son of Johann Christian Dämmert and Susanna Olympia Antoinette Salles.

He held a Doctor of Laws degree. He was married to Cornelia Wilhelmine Amsinck. He died, aged 66, in Hamburg.
