= Johannes Amsinck =

German businessman and philanthropist

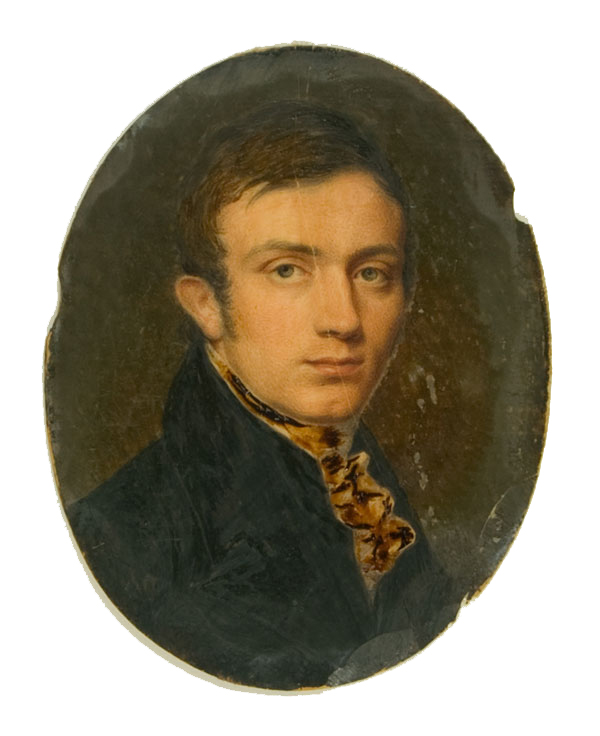
Johannes Amsinck

Johannes Amsinck (23 March 1792 in Hamburg – 8 September 1879 in Hamburg) was a German businessman and philanthropist.

A member of the Dutch-origined Amsinck family, he was a son of Hamburg mayor Wilhelm Amsinck. In 1815 he became a co-owner of the firm Johannes Schuback & Söhne, which had been founded by his maternal grandfather, and became the sole owner in 1837. The firm focused on the trade with South America, and Amsinck played a major role in the establishment of the shipping companies HAPAG and Hamburg Süd.
