= Ditmar Koel =

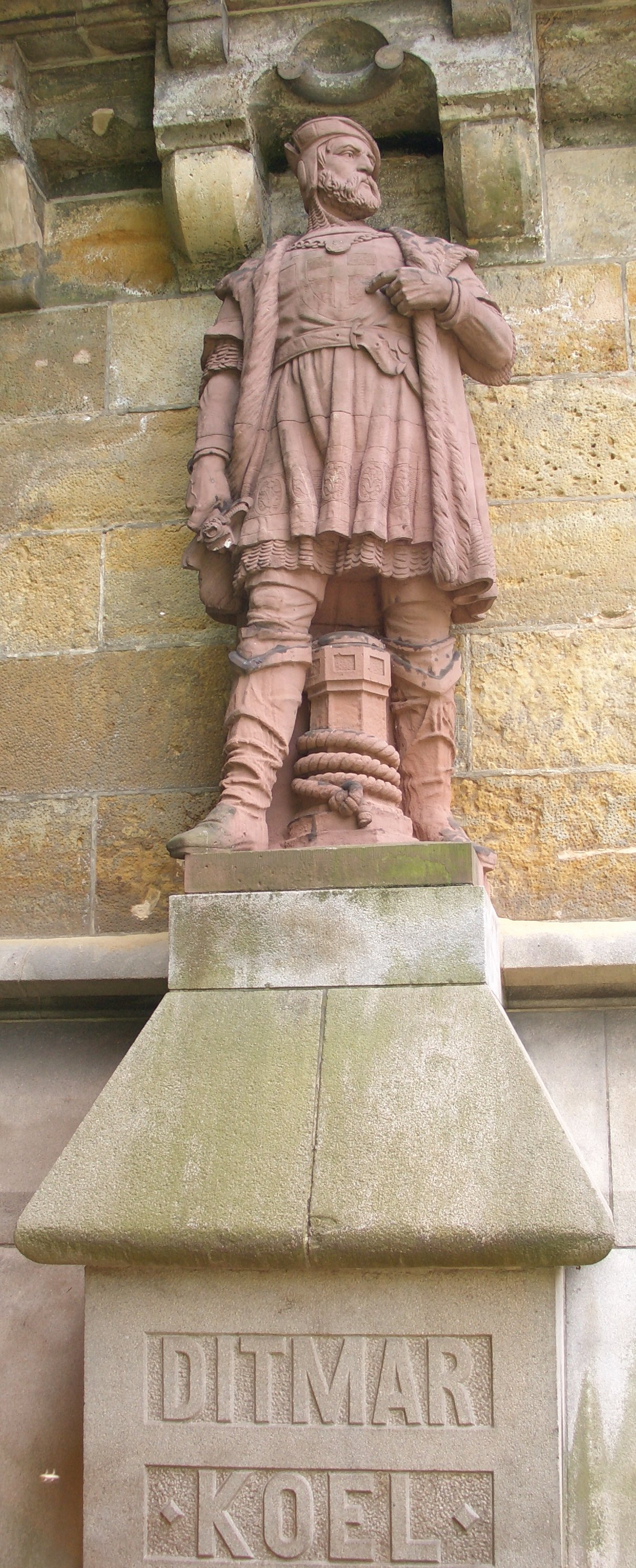

First Mayor of Hamburg
- In office 1548–1553
- Preceded by: Matthias Rheder
- Succeeded by: Albert Hackmann

Personal details
- Born: around 1500
- Died: 22 September 1563 Hamburg

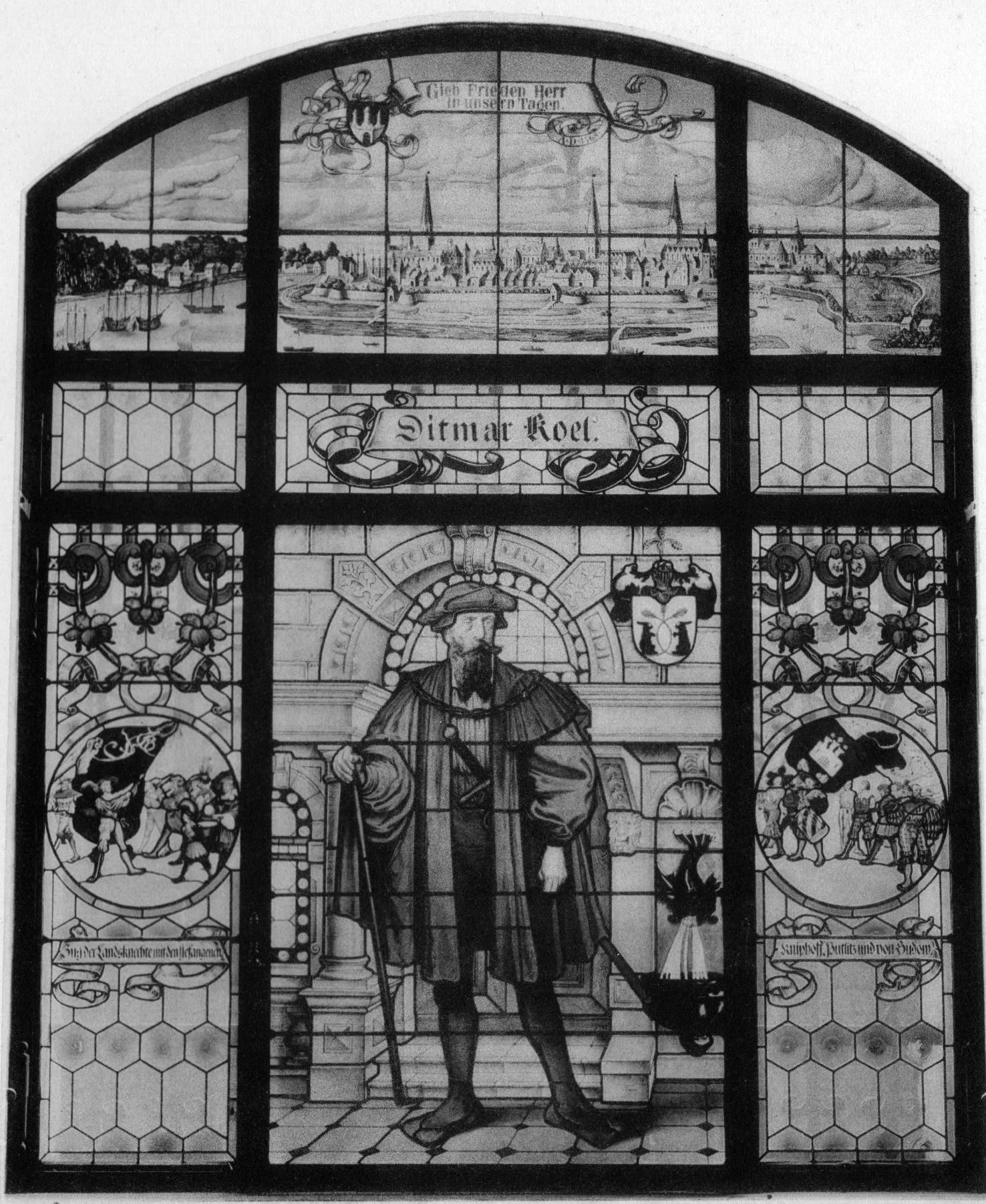
Window painting of Ditmar Koel in Hamburg town hall

Ditmar Koel, also Dithmar Koel, Ditmar Kohl or Dietmar Koehl (born around 1500, died 22 September 1563 in Hamburg), was a Captain, successful pirate hunter and Mayor of Hamburg.

== Biography ==
In 1525 Koel was commander of one of four ships of the fleet of Admiral Simon Parseval. 7 October he came into sea battle with the fleet of the pirate Claus Kniphoff. After 8 hours he managed to take the ship Gallion.

He brought the pirates and the loot to Hamburg, and in 1527 was elected to Ratsherr (councilman).

Koel promoted the Reformation and initiated the reformation of the Hansatown.

In 1536, as Admiral for a defence fleet, he stopped a raid from Count Palatine Friedrich von Hadeln.

From 1542 until 1548 Koel was Amtmann of Bergedorf.,

In 1548 Koel was elected mayor of Hamburg.

In 1559 he was in command of the defence of Hamburg-Moorburg against an attack from duke Otto I, Duke of Brunswick-Harburg.

In 1562 he traveled with two colleagues in a diplomatic journey to Copenhagen, in order to settle a conflict with the Danish king.

Successfully, he returned to Hamburg, where he died on 22 September 1563.

== Namesakes of Ditmar Koel ==
Streets

- Ditmar-Koel-Straße in Portugiesenviertel in southern Neustadt is named after him, as well as another Ditmar-Koel-Straße in Cuxhaven.

Ships

- 1935 a pilot boat was named Ditmar Koel.
- 1955 a steamboat owned by the Emil Offen & Co had his name.
- 1958 a pilot boat made by Meyer-Werft in Papenburg was named after Koel.

== Literature ==
- Bardo Metzger: Ditmar Koel und die Einführung der Reformation in Bergedorf. In: Olaf Matthes (Hrsg.): Kirche zwischen Dorf und Stadt. St. Petri und Pauli zu Hamburg-Bergedorf in der Geschichte. Convent Verlag, Hamburg 2002, ISBN 3-934613-46-2.
- Friedrich Georg Buek: Die hamburgischen Oberalten, ihre bürgerliche Wirksamkeit und ihre Familien, Page 70, Perthes & Besser 1857 (Digital version)
