= Amsinck family =

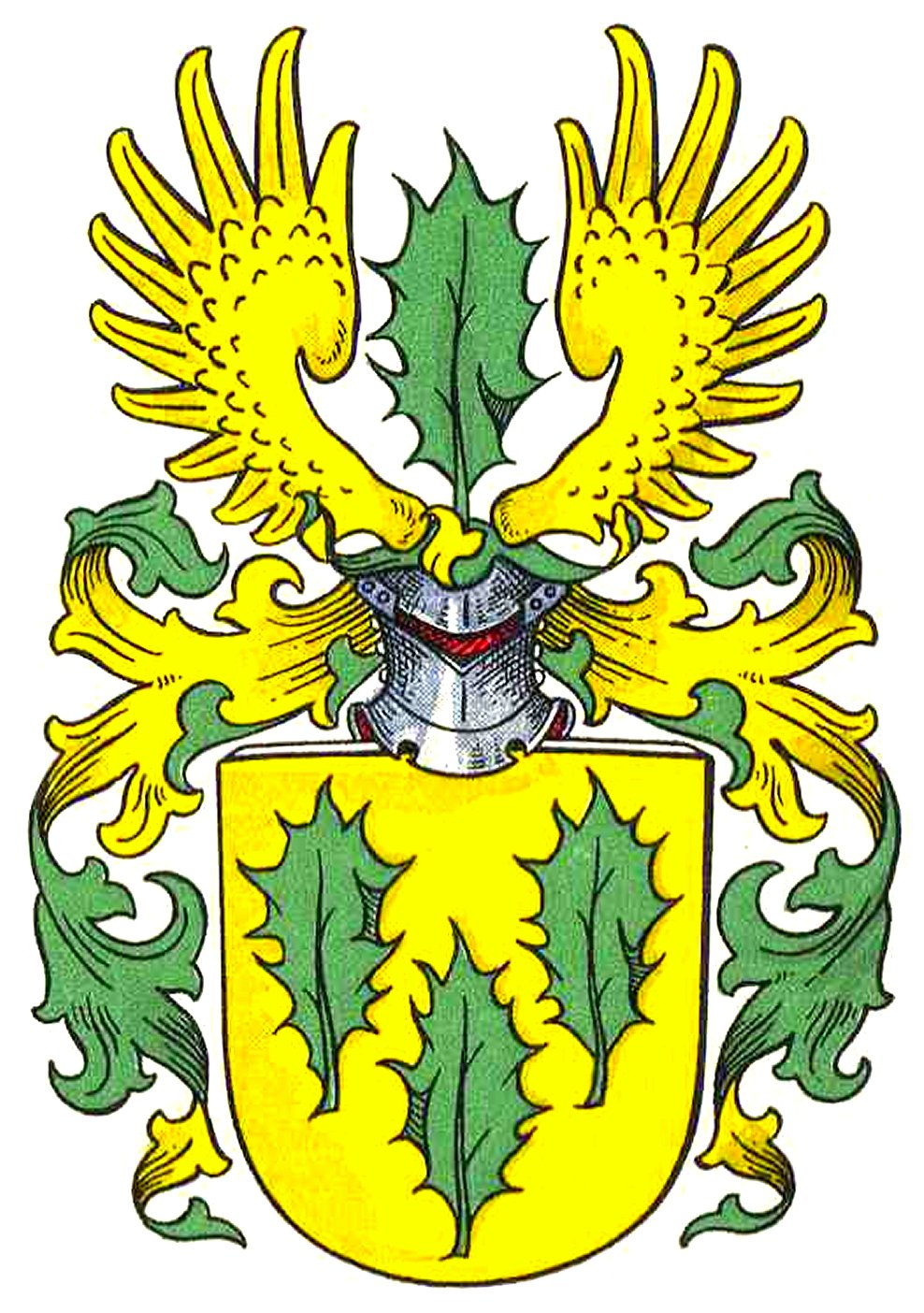
Coat of arms of the Amsinck family

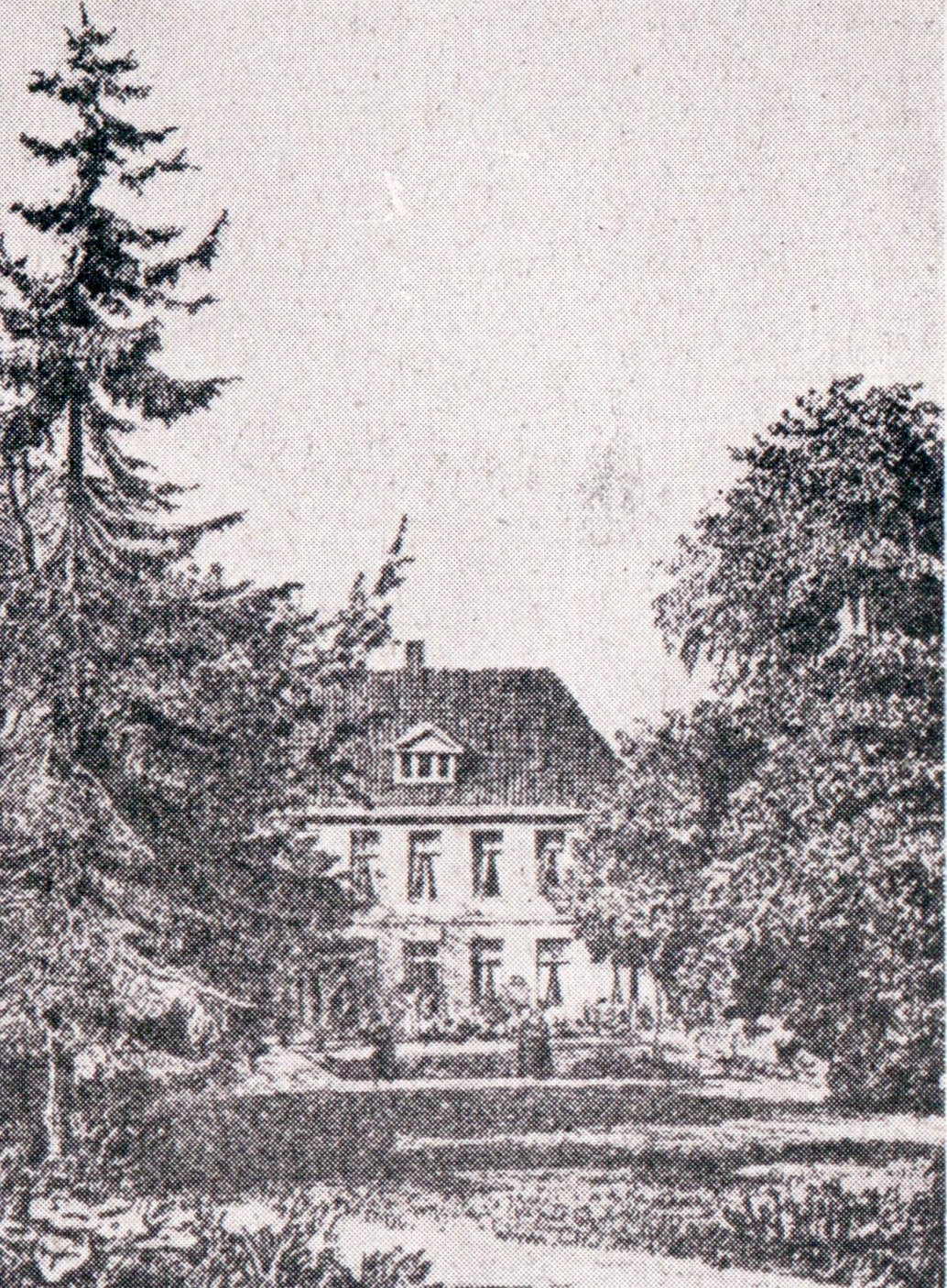
A country house of the Amsinck family in Hamburg

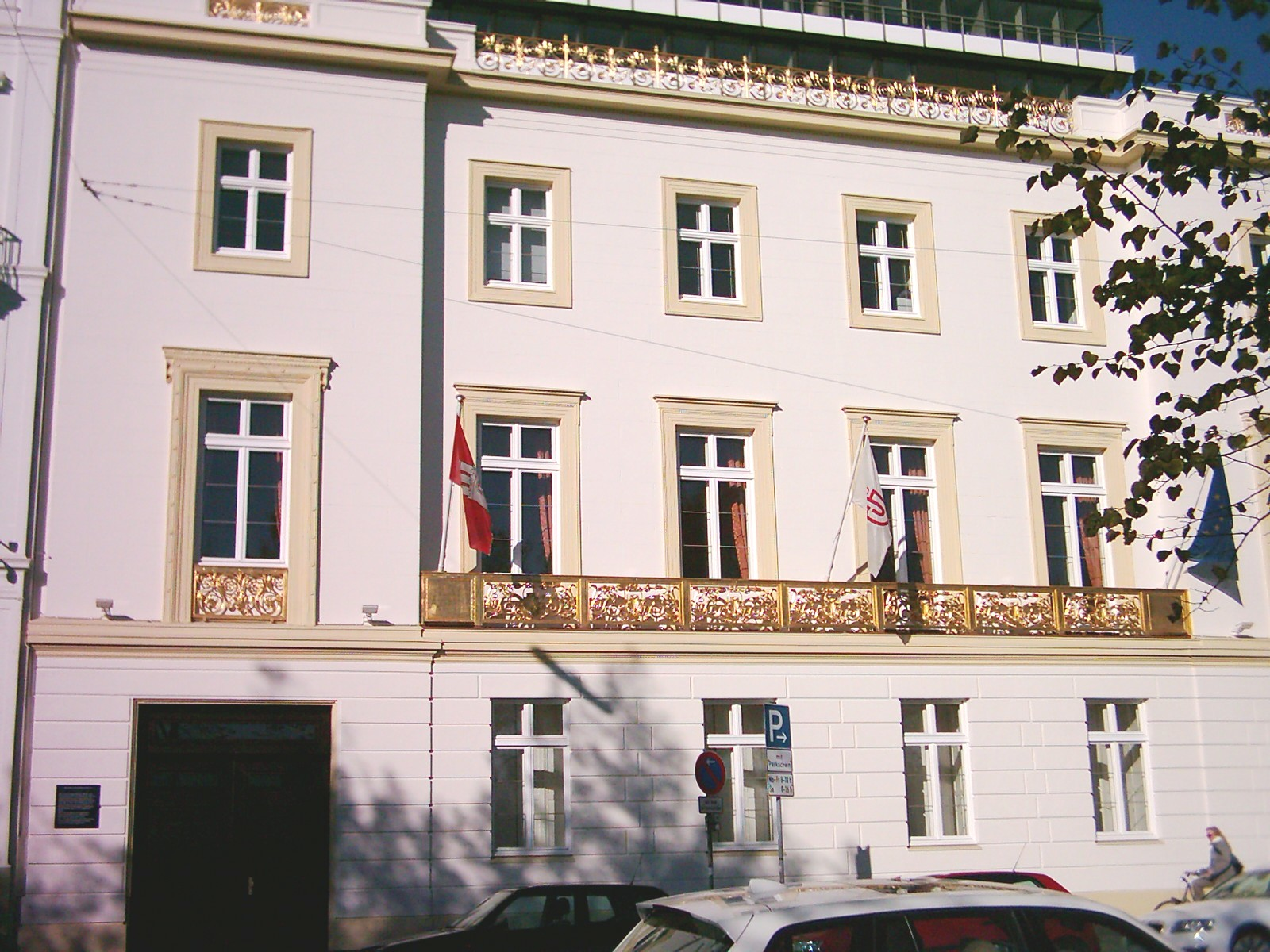
The Amsinck Palais, a city house of the family in Hamburg in the early 20th century

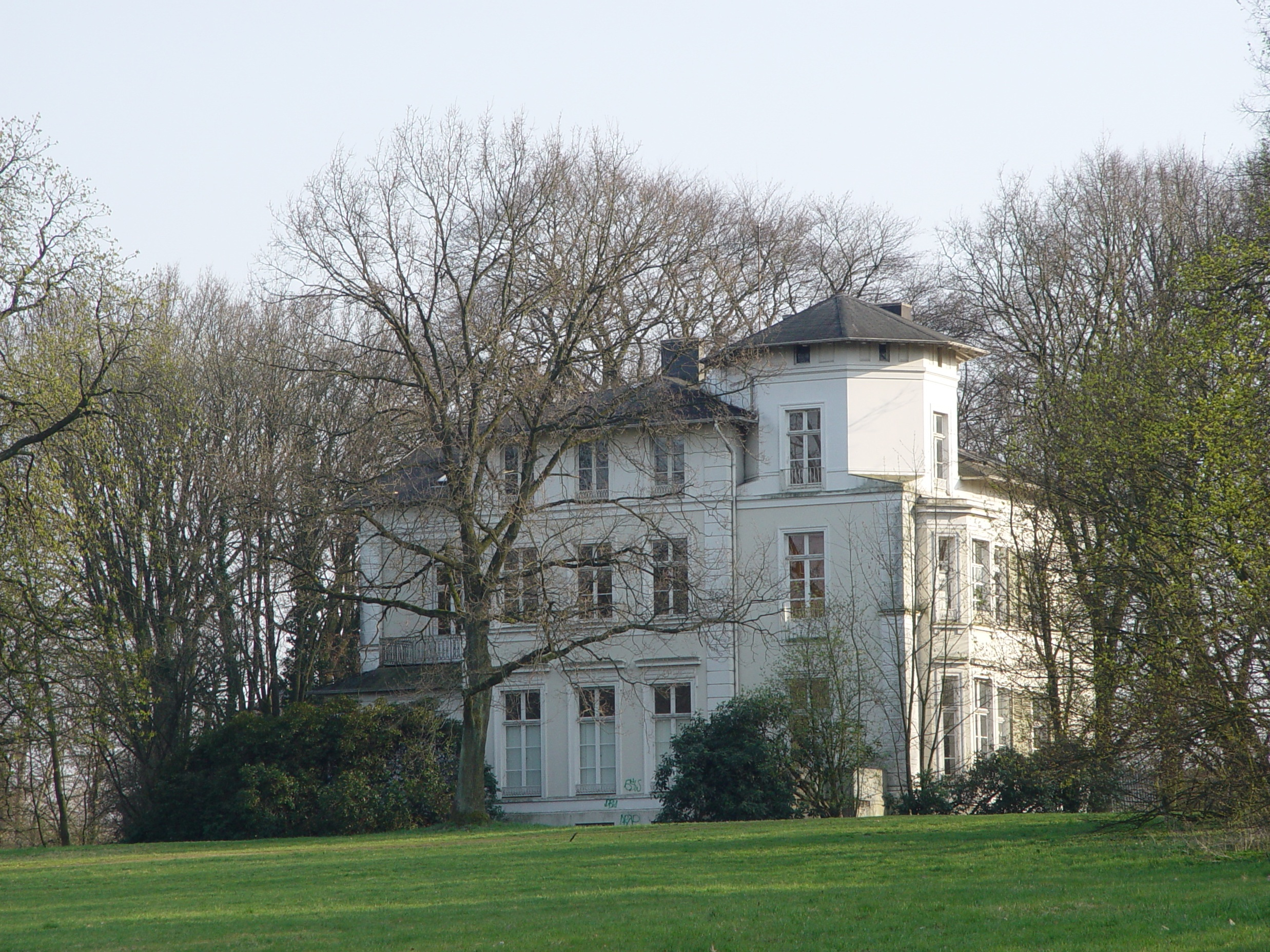
A villa of the Amsinck family in Hamburg

The Amsinck family is a Dutch-origined patrician family whose members were prominent merchants in multiple countries including the Netherlands, Hamburg, Portugal, England, France, Hanover, Holstein, Denmark, Suriname and India. From the 17th century the Hamburg branch of the family formed part of the city-state's ruling class, the Hanseaten or hereditary grand burghers, who enjoyed legal privileges in Hamburg until 1918. Amsinck has been one of Hamburg's great business families over many centuries, and its members reached the highest positions in Hamburg society, including as senators and head of state. A branch of the family were large plantation owners in Suriname. The Hamburg branch retained a Dutch identity for centuries, often intermarrying with other Dutch-origined patrician families.

The family is descended from Johan Amsinck (born ca. 1410–1430), a burgher of Oldenzaal in 1459. His grandson Rudolph Amsinck (1518–1582/90) was Mayor of Zwolle.

The flowering plant genus Amsinckia is named after the family in honour of the Hamburg head of state and patron of botany Wilhelm Amsinck (1752–1831).

== Hamburg branch, with branches in Lisbon and London ==
The son of Rudolph Amsinck, Willem Amsinck (ca. 1542–1618), fled the Netherlands in 1576 and came as a religious refugee to Hamburg, where he became a wealthy cloth merchant. The family in Hamburg often intermarried with other families of Dutch/Flemish descent, and is closely related to other patrician families of Hamburg, such as the Berenbergs/Gosslers. Willem Amsinck was married to Henrica de Rouse and they were the parents of Rudolf Amsinck (1577–1636), who became a senator of Hamburg, and who was married to Isabeau (Isabella) de Hertoghe (1583–1636) from Antwerp, whose family formed part of the seven noble houses of Brussels patrician group in what is now Belgium. Their descendants were prominent merchants in Hamburg, Lisbon and other European cities with Dutch merchant colonies, as well as in London.

Paul Amsinck (1733–1812) was Ambassador of the Hanseatic states to the Court of St. James's (the United Kingdom; 1771-1784). In 1802, Wilhelm Amsinck (1752–1831) became First Mayor of Hamburg and President of the Senate (i.e. head of state of the free imperial city and de facto independent city-state), having been elected to its senate in 1786. Johannes Amsinck (1792–1879) earned a fortune by trading with newly independent South American states in the early 19th century, and was involved in the establishment of the Vereinsbank Hamburg and the Hamburg America Line (HAPAG). He was married to Emilie Gossler, daughter of Senator Johann Heinrich Gossler. He was the father of Martin Garlieb Amsinck (1831–1905), a leading ship-owner of Hamburg. Members of the family were also large land-owners in Holstein.

The Amsincks were one of the oldest, most prosperous and most respected Hanseatic families of Hamburg; a marriage to an Amsinck or a Berenberg/Gossler could greatly advance one's social position in the 18th and 19th centuries, as was the case with Hamburg head of state Max Predöhl.

The Hamburg Amsinck family lost most of its fortune during the hyperinflation in the Weimar Republic.

In Hamburg, the Amsinck Park and the Amsinckstraße main road are named for the family. Many family members are buried at the Old Niendorf Cemetery. In Suriname, some former slaves adopted the surname Amsinck or Amzink after their former masters following the emancipation. The name Amzink is still used by a number of black people in Suriname.

=== Gallery ===
Rudolf Amsinck (1577–1636), Hamburg Senator and merchant (This and the following painting
by David Kindt)

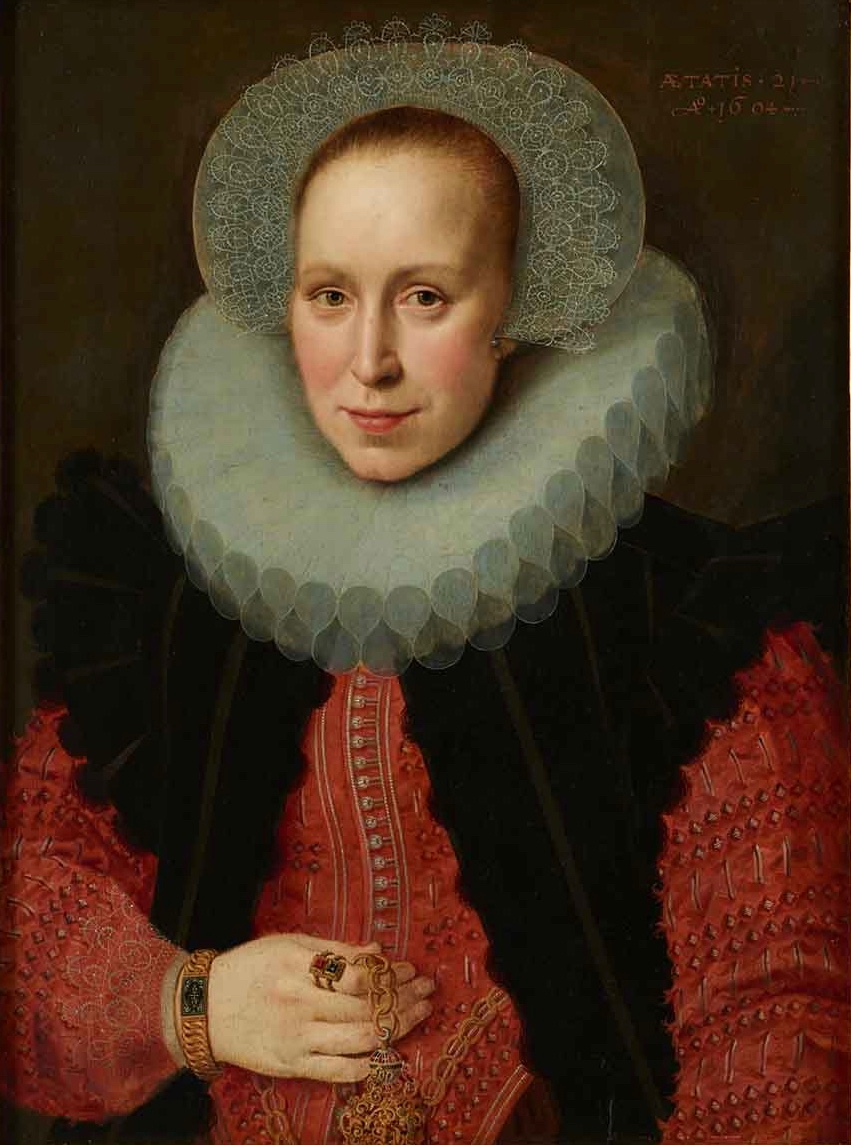
Isabeau (Isabella) Amsinck, née de Hertoghe (1583–1636), a member of the Seven noble houses of Brussels patrician group

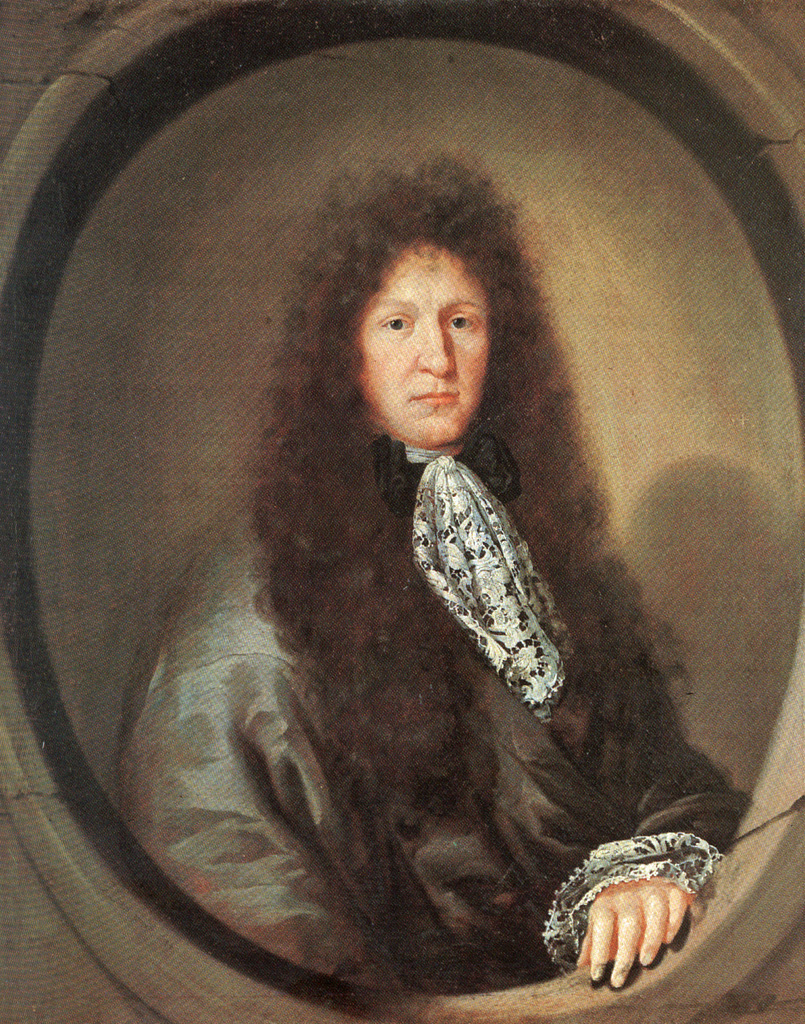
Hamburg lawyer Zimbert Amsinck (1650–1696). He was named for his grandfather Zimbert Jenisch.

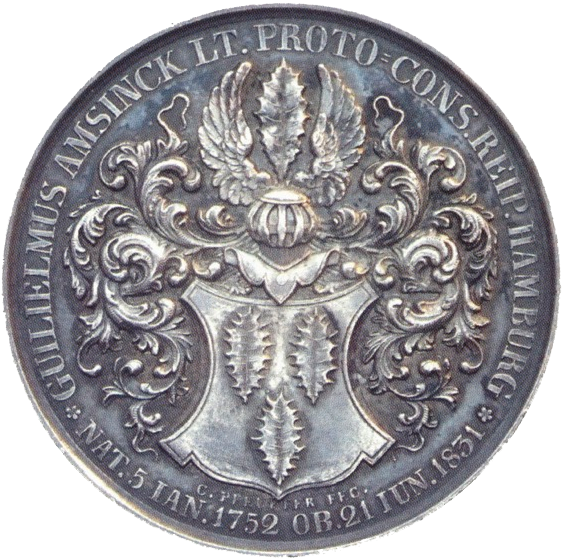
Hamburg memorial coin with Amsinck coat of arms

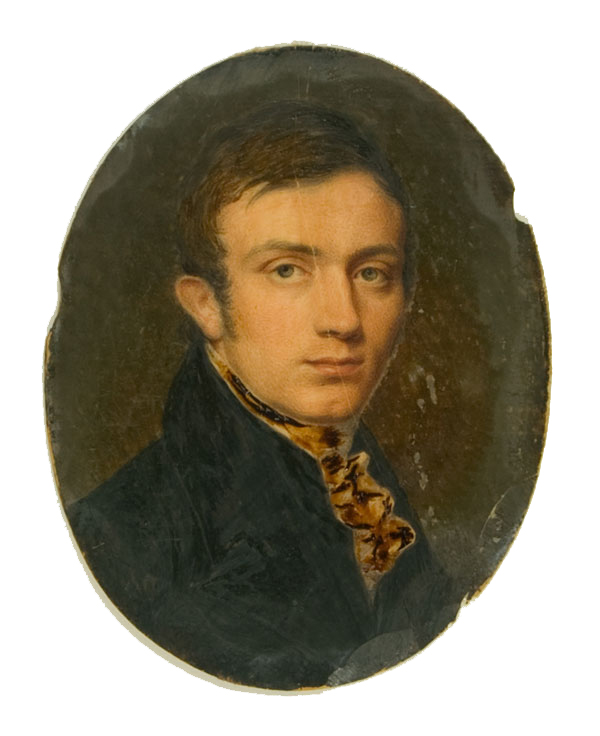
Johannes Amsinck (1792–1879), who earned a fortune by trading with newly independent South American states

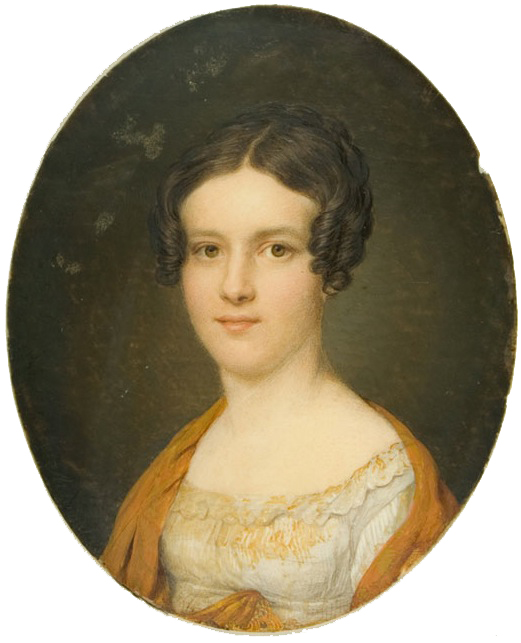
Emilie Amsinck, née Gossler (1799–1875)

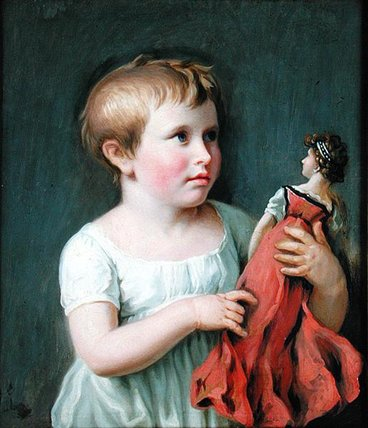
Child portrait of Cornelia Wilhelmine Amsinck (1800–61), future wife of Hamburg head of state Johann Ludwig Dammert, painted by Johann Heinrich Wilhelm Tischbein

== Amsterdam branch, with Suriname and India branches ==
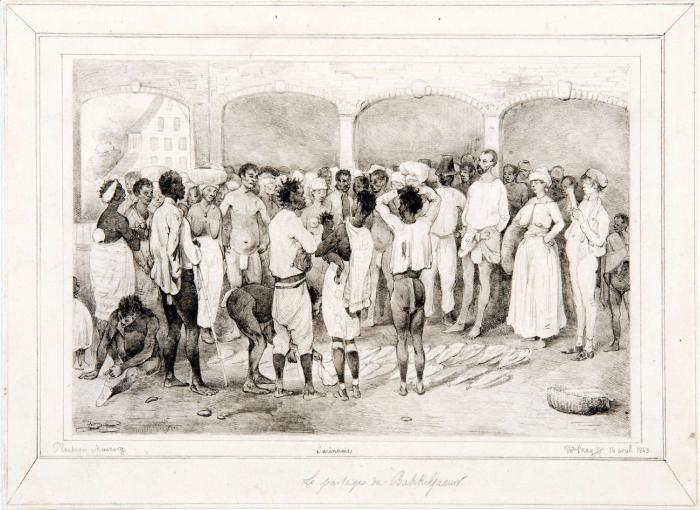
The Meerzorg plantation in Suriname owned by Paul Amsinck's descendants in 1843

The Dutch branch of the family were plantation owners in the Dutch colony of Suriname; the family built the Meerzorg plantation—one of the earliest and largest coffee plantations—in the late 17th century and owned it until the mid 19th century. Their heirs received compensation for the abolition of slavery in the Dutch Atlantic in 1863 (Weiske, 2024 'German Participation in Dutch Atlantic Slavery). Cornelius Amsinck settled in India around 1650.

== Literature ==
- Caesar Amsinck, Otto Hintze: Die niederländische und hamburgische Familie Amsinck: ein Versuch einer Familiengeschichte. 3 Bände: 1. Von der Mitte des 14. Jahrhunderts bis zum Anfang des 18. Jahrhunderts (1886), 2. Vom Anfang des 18. Jahrhunderts bis zum Beginn der französischen Revolution (1891), 3. Von der Mitte des 18. Jahrhunderts bis zur Gegenwart (1932)
- Georg T. Amsinck: En holstensk godsejer omkring år 1800: justitsråd Garlieb Amsinck. Gentofte 2005
- Georg T. Amsinck: Garleff Amsinck: Storkøbmand og Oberalter i det 18. århundredes Hamborg. Gentofte 2015
- Eckart Kleßmann: Geschichte der Stadt Hamburg. Hamburg 2002
- Arne Cornelius Wasmuth: Hanseatische Dynastien. Alte Hamburger Familien öffnen ihre Alben. Hamburg 2001
- Constanze Rheinholz: "Gustav Amsinck. Ein Hamburger Großkaufmann in New York" (Mäzene für Wissenschaft; 11), Hamburg 2011
- L. E. Amsinck, Stammbaum der Familie Amsinck 1410–, 1884
