= Mehria Ashuftah =

German politician

Member of the Hamburg Parliament
- Incumbent
- Assumed office 2025
- Constituency: State list

Personal details
- Born: 3 November 1987 (age 38) Kabul, Afghanistan
- Party: Social Democratic Party of Germany
- Education: University of Hamburg
- Occupation: Politician; lawyer; lecturer

Mehria Ashuftah (born 3 November 1987) is a German politician serving as a Social Democratic member of the Hamburg Parliament since 2025. Prior to her election, she worked as a lawyer and law lecturer.

== Biography ==
Ashuftah was born in Kabul on 3 November 1987. Her parents both worked as teachers, with her father being an aircraft engineer. Shortly after her first birthday, her parents fled with her via Pakistan to a refugee shelter in Groß Borstel, with her father and two uncles being political dissidents. Her journey involved "trekk[ing] for three days over the mountains to Pakistan" with more than a dozen people. She worked at a Pakistani refugee camp with her father and later graduated from Gymnasium Langenhorn.

Inspired by her aunt (who worked as a lawyer back in Afghanistan), Ashuftah studied law at the University of Hamburg and completed her rechtsreferendariat at the Schleswig-Holstein Higher Regional Court. Afterwards, she became a lawyer, as well as a lecturer at the University of Hamburg Faculty of Law. She has also served as a lecturer at the Institute for Democracy, Diversity, and Leadership at the Hamburg Police Academy, as well as a board member for Dolle Deerns e.V., a patron for the Hamburg Student Union, and a values ambassador for GermanDream. She also founded the Refugee Law Center branch RLC-#KnowYourRights. She also ran a direct marketing company with her ex-husband.

Following the publication of the 2010 anti-multiculturalist book Germany Abolishes Itself, Ashuftah joined the Social Democratic Party of Germany in January 2011. She held several positions within Jusos for the first seven years at SPD. In February 2024, she joined the SPD Hamburg-Nord district executive committee and became chair of the SPD Groß Borstel district committee.

Ashuftah was elected to the Hamburg Parliament in the 2025 Hamburg state election through the SPD's state list. At the Parliament, she is a member of the Budget Committee, as well as the Committees on Culture and Media; on Equality and Anti-Discrimination; and on Justice and Consumer Protection.

Ashuftah was married to a German man from 2007 until their divorce in 2014. In 2025, she told the Hamburger Abendblatt about her experiences of being a victim of spousal abuse, including death threats he made against her and her family.
