= Ingolf Dahl =

German and American musician (1912–1970)

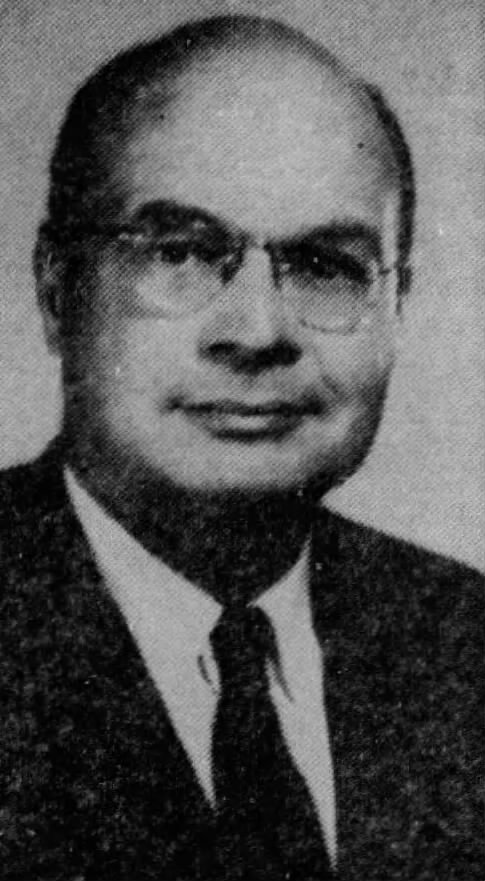
- Dahl c. 1968
- Born: June 9, 1912; Hamburg, German Empire
- Died: August 6, 1970 (aged 58); Frutigen, Switzerland
- Occupations: Classical composer, pianist, conductor, educator

Ingolf Dahl (June 9, 1912 – August 6, 1970) was a German-born American composer, pianist, conductor, and educator.

== Biography ==
Dahl was born Walter Ingolf Marcus in Hamburg, Germany, to a German Jewish father, attorney Paul Marcus, and his Swedish wife Hilda Maria Dahl. He had two brothers, Gert Marcus (1914–2008; a noted Swedish artist and sculptor, and a recipient of the Prince Eugen Medal), and Holger, and one sister, Anna-Britta.

In Hamburg, Dahl studied piano under Edith Weiss-Mann, a harpsichordist, pianist, and a proponent of early music. Dahl studied with Philipp Jarnach at the Hochschule für Musik Köln (1930–32). Dahl left Germany as the Nazi Party was coming to power and continued his studies at the University of Zurich, along with Volkmar Andreae and Walter Frey. Living with relatives and working at the Zürich Opera for more than six years, he rose from an internship to the rank of assistant conductor. He served as a vocal coach and chorus master for the world premieres of Alban Berg's Lulu and Paul Hindemith's Mathis der Maler.

Since Switzerland became increasingly hostile towards Jewish refugees (including people of partial Jewish parentage) and Dahl's role at the Opera was restricted to playing in the orchestra, he emigrated to the United States in 1939. There he used the name Ingolf Dahl, based on his original middle name and his mother's maiden name. He consistently lied about his background, claiming to be of Swedish birth and denying his Jewish heritage (Marcus being a recognizably Jewish surname). He claimed to have emigrated a year earlier than he actually had. He settled in Los Angeles and joined the community of expatriate musicians that included Ernst Krenek, Darius Milhaud, Arnold Schoenberg, Igor Stravinsky, and Ernst Toch. He had a varied musical career as a solo pianist, keyboard performer (piano and harpsichord), accompanist, conductor, coach, composer, and critic. He produced a performing translation of Schoenberg's Pierrot lunaire in English and translated, either alone or with a collaborator, such works as Stravinsky's Poetics of Music. He performed many of Stravinsky's works and the composer was impressed enough to contract Dahl to create a two-piano version of his Danses concertantes and program notes for other works. In 1947, with Joseph Szigeti he produced a reconstruction of Bach's Violin Concerto in D minor.

He also worked in the entertainment industry, touring as pianist to Edgar Bergen and his puppets in 1941 and later for comedian Gracie Fields in 1942 and 1956. He produced musical arrangements for Tommy Dorsey and served as arranger/conductor to Victor Borge. He gave private lessons in the classical repertoire to Benny Goodman as well. He performed on keyboard instruments in the soundtrack orchestras for many films at Fox, Goldwyn Studios, Columbia, Universal, MGM, and Warner Bros., as well as the post-production company Todd-AO. He also worked on the television show The Twilight Zone. Though grateful for the income this work provided, he complained while working on Spartacus how pointless it was "to tinkle a few notes on the celeste" when the notes are also doubled by several other instruments, all for a passage presented to the audience under sound effects and actors' voices. Dahl conducted the soundtrack to The Abductors (1957) by his pupil Paul Glass and performed both second and third movements of Beethoven's Pathétique Sonata in the 1969 animated film A Boy Named Charlie Brown.

Among his compositions, the most frequently performed is the Concerto for Alto Saxophone and Wind Orchestra commissioned and premiered by Sigurd Raschèr in 1949. The piece went through several major revisions and re-scorings during Dahl's lifetime, but the original version was restored by Paul Cohen and recorded in 2021. Dahl later completed commissions for the Los Angeles Philharmonic and the Koussevitzky and Fromm foundations. His final work, complete and partly orchestrated at his death in 1970, was the Elegy Concerto for violin and chamber orchestra. In 1999, one critic reviewing a recording of Dahl's works called him a "spiffy composer", "a cross between Stravinsky and Hindemith".

He legally changed his name to Ingolf Dahl in February 1943 and became a naturalized U.S. citizen in September of that year. In 1945 he joined the faculty of the University of Southern California Thornton School of Music in Los Angeles, where he taught for the rest of his life. In 1952 he was appointed the first head of the Tanglewood Study Group, a program that targeted not professionals but "the intelligent amateur and music enthusiast, also the general music student and music educator". His most prominent students included the conductor Michael Tilson Thomas and the composers Harold Budd and David Cope. In 1957 he co-directed the Ojai Music Festival in partnership with Aaron Copland and served as its music director from 1964 to 1966.

Among Dahl's honors were a Guggenheim Fellowship in music composition in 1951, two Huntington Hartford Fellowships, an Excellence in Teaching Award from the University of Southern California, the ASCAP Stravinsky Award, and a grant from the National Institute of Arts and Letters in 1954.

He died in Frutigen, Switzerland, on August 6, 1970, just a few weeks after the death of his wife on June 10.

== Personal life ==
From his teenage years, Dahl was initially bisexual, but from then onward, "his preference and partiality...remained with men". He had his first homosexual experiences at the age of 16 with the painter Eduard Bargheer. He kept his sexual orientation secret in his professional life, even as he cataloged in his diaries a wide variety of infatuations, affairs, trysts, and relationships. After coming to America, Dahl married Etta Gornick Linick, whom he had met in Zürich. She accepted his homosexuality, helped him to keep it hidden, and shared his affection with a lover whom Dahl had met on a trip to Boston, and occasionally visited there. He maintained an intimate, though never exclusive, relationship for the last fifteen years of his life with Bill Colvig, whom he met on a Sierra Club hiking trip.

Notations in his manuscripts show he sometimes found inspiration in his male companions for his compositions. Hymn (1947) was inspired by Dahl's year-long affair with an art student he met at U.S.C. and movements of A Cycle of Sonnets (1967) carry the initials of two others.

His step-son, Anthony Linick, only learned of his homosexuality in a letter of condolence the step-son received upon Dahl's death. He assessed the relationship between Dahl's private and public sides in these words:

His social life and his compositions never seemed to acquire that ease of communication that sustain many gifted creators, those titans whose ability to tap into the well-springs of their being allow them to produce a copious and enviable body of artistic endeavor. Ingolf labored under levels of repression that were antithetical to such a process. He did not choose to be who he was, nor did he choose to make his true self available to the wider world. He lived and died without the luxury of candor.

== Later recognition ==
Dahl's music has been recorded on the Boston Records, Capstone, Centaur, Chandos Records, CRI, Crystal, Klavier Music Productions, MKH Medien Kontor Hamburg, Nimbus, and Summit labels.

Among Dahl's students are the American conductors Michael Tilson Thomas, Lawrence Christianson, William Hall, William Dehning, Frank A. Salazar, the pianist William Teaford, and the composers Morten Lauridsen, Williametta Spencer, Norma Wendelburg, and Lawrence Moss. Tilson Thomas assessed him this way: "Dahl was an inspiring teacher; over and above the subject matter, he showed his students about the practical value of humanism. That is, how to let humanistic concerns infuse your daily existence."

The Music Library of the University of Southern California (USC) holds the Ingolf Dahl Archive. It includes scores, manuscripts, papers, and tapes. Dahl also kept a diary in annual volumes from 1928 until his death in 1970. In 2012 his stepson, Anthony Linick, who wrote an extensive biography of Ingolf, donated these to USC.

The West Coast chapters of the American Musicological Society present the Ingolf Dahl Memorial Award in Musicology annually.

Recently there has been a revival of interest in the history of the Marcus–Dahl family, its flight from Hamburg, and the cultural contributions of Ingolf Dahl and his brother, the sculptor Gert Marcus. In 2017 residents of Groß Borstel founded a new society, "Initiative Marcus und Dahl", with the goal of reviving interest in the work of Gert Marcus and Ingolf Dahl as well as other artists living or working, or having lived or worked, in Groß Borstel. "Initiative Marcus und Dahl" has been responsible for a number of projects. Among these one can cite the production of a new CD in 2018 of Ingolf Dahl's chamber music – Intervals – under the direction of Volker Ahmels.

In 2019, Melina Paetzold produced a German-language biography of Ingolf Dahl.

== List of works (partial) ==
- Allegro and Arioso (1943, woodwind quintet)
- Aria Sinfonica (1965, revised 1968, orchestra, 4 movements)
- Cello Duo, aka Duo (1946, revised 1949, 1959, and 1969, cello and piano)
- Concerto a Tre (1947, violin, cello, and clarinet); premiered by Benny Goodman, clarinet, with Eudice Shapiro, violin, and Victor Gottlieb, cello
- A Cycle of Sonnets (1968, baritone and piano)
- Divertimento for Viola and Piano, aka Viola Divertimento (1948)
- Duettino Concertante (1966, flute and percussion)
- Elegy Concerto (1970, violin and chamber orchestra)
- Five Duets (1970, two clarinets)
- Hymn and Toccata for Solo Piano, later Hymn (1947, solo piano, 2 movements, later each movement performed alone)
- I.M.C. Fanfare (1973, three trumpets and three trombones)
- Intervals aka Four Intervals (1967, fourth movement added 1969, string orchestra; later piano four hands)
- Little Canonic Suite (1969, violin and viola)
- Music for Brass Instruments, aka Brass Quintet (1944, two trumpets, horn, two trombones, and optional tuba)
- A Noiseless Patient Spider (1970, women's chorus and piano)
- Notturno (1953, a movement excerpted from Cello Duo, cello and piano)
- Piano Quartet (1957, revised 1959, 1961, string trio and piano)
- Quodlibet on American Folktunes: The Fancy Blue Devil's Breakdown (1953, two pianos, eight hands; 1966, version for orchestra)
- Saxophone Concerto (1948, alto saxophone and concert band; 1959, revised for alto saxophone and wind ensemble)
- Serenade for Four Flutes (1960)
- Sinfonietta for Concert Band (1961)
- Sonata da Camera (1970, clarinet and piano)
- Sonata Pastorale (1959, piano solo)
- Sonata Seria (1953, revised 1962, piano solo)
- Symphony Concertante (1952, later revised, two clarinets and orchestra)
- Three Songs to Poems by Albert Ehrismann (1933, soprano and piano)
- The Tower of Saint Barbara: A Symphonic Legend in Four Parts (1955, revised 1960, orchestra, 4 movements, ballet)
- Trio (1962, piano, violin, cello)
- Variations on a French Folk Tune (1935, flute and piano)
- Variations on a Swedish Folk Tune (1945, solo flute; 1970, revised for flute and alto flute)
- Variations on an Air by Couperin (alto recorder and harpsichord or flute and piano)

== Written works ==
- "Notes on Cartoon Music" in Mervyn Cooke, ed., The Hollywood Film Music Reader (Oxford University Press, 2010)

== Sources ==
- Crawford, Dorothy Lamb (2009). A Windfall of Musicians: Hitler's Émigrés and Exiles in Southern California. New Haven: Yale University Press.
- Anthony Linick, The Lives of Ingolf Dahl (Bloomington, Indiana: AuthorHouse, 2008)
- Paetzold, Melina (2019). Ingolf Dahl: Biografie eines musikalischen Wanderers. Rostock: Zentrum für Musik, Rostock University of Music and Theatre.
- Schwartz, Steve (1999). "Defining Dahl: The Music of Ingolf Dahl – review". ClassicalNet.
