= Stavenhagen (disambiguation) =

Stavenhagen is a municipality in Mecklenburgische Seenplatte district, Mecklenburg-Vorpommern, Germany.

Stavenhagen may also refer to:

- Stavenhagen (Amt), an amt in Mecklenburgische Seenplatte district, Mecklenburg-Vorpommern, Germany

== People with the surname ==
- Agnes Stavenhagen (1860–1945), German soprano, wife of Bernhard
- Bernhard Stavenhagen (1862–1914), German pianist, composer and conductor
- Lutz Stavenhagen (1940–1992), German politician
- Rodolfo Stavenhagen (1932–2016), Mexican sociologist

== See also ==
- Stavenhagenhaus or Frustberg House, a cultural heritage site in Groß Borstel, Hamburg, Germany
