= Linick =

Linick is a surname. Notable people with the surname include:

- Anthony Linick (born 1938), American educator and author
- Steve Linick (born 1963), former American Inspector General of the Department of State
