= Gert Marcus =

Swedish artist (1914–2008)

- Born: Gert Olof Marcus; 10 November 1914; Hamburg, Germany
- Died: 23 December 2008 (aged 94); Stockholm, Sweden
- Known for: Sculptor
- Spouse(s): Anne-Marie Söderlund (m. 1945–1970), Françoise Ribeyrolles-Marcus (m. 1977–)
- Children: 3
- Awards: Prince Eugen Medal (1999)

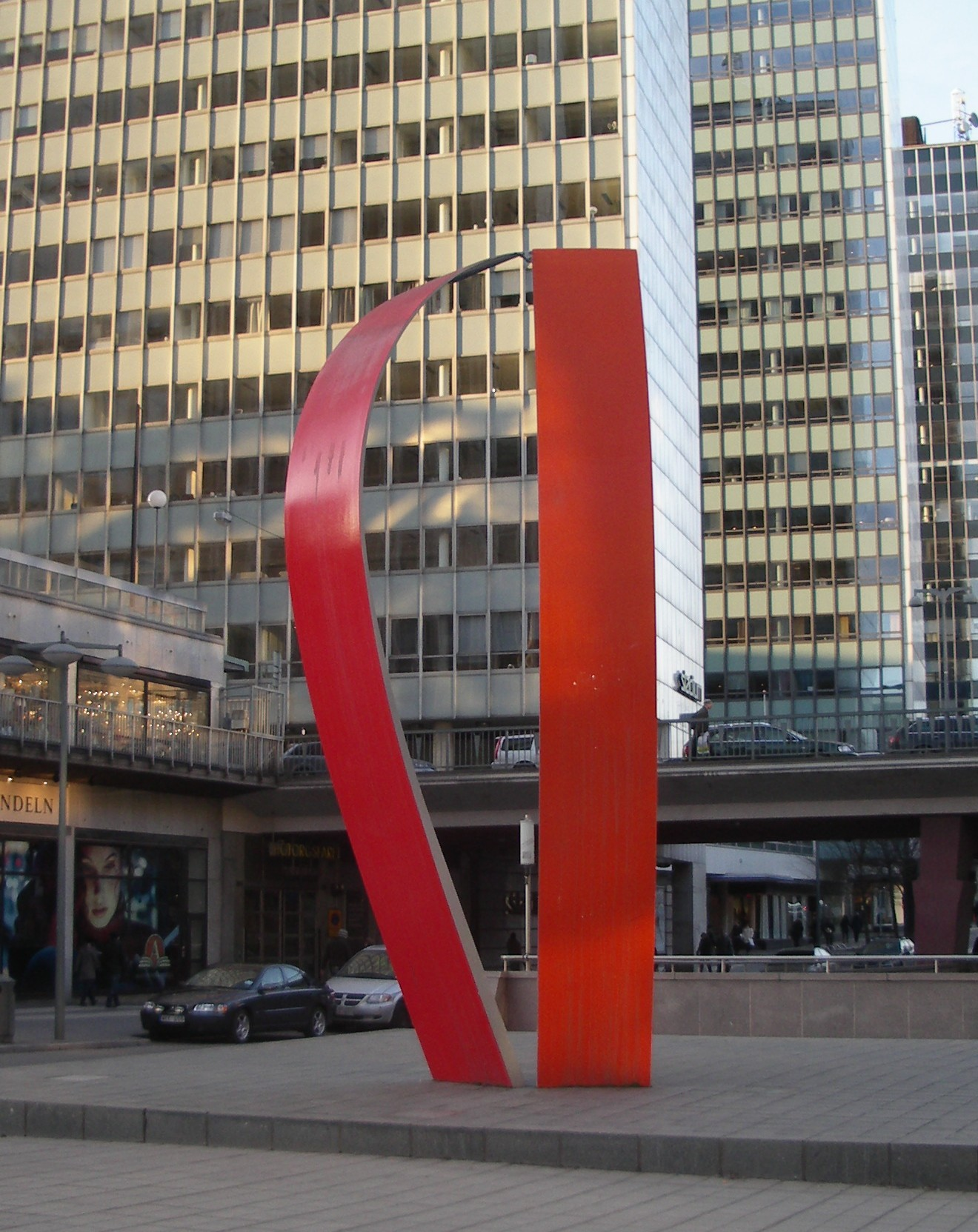
Di-eder, on Sergels Torg in Stockholm (Åke Sandström)

Gert Olof Marcus (1914–2008) was a German-born Swedish painter and sculptor.

== Background and early life ==
He was born 10 November 1914 in the Groß Borstel district of Hamburg, Germany. Marcus’ father was a German Jewish lawyer named Paul Marcus and his mother, Hilda Maria Dahl, was Swedish. The couple had four children: Ingolf, Gert, Holger, and Anna Britta. With the rise of Nazism, the family had to flee Germany in 1933. Ingolf, who was at that time a young pianist, had already moved to Zurich, where he later began a career as a conductor and composer. In 1939, he moved to Los Angeles and took his mother's maiden name, Dahl. Gert Marcus and his brother Holger moved to Sweden in 1933; other family members joined them there.

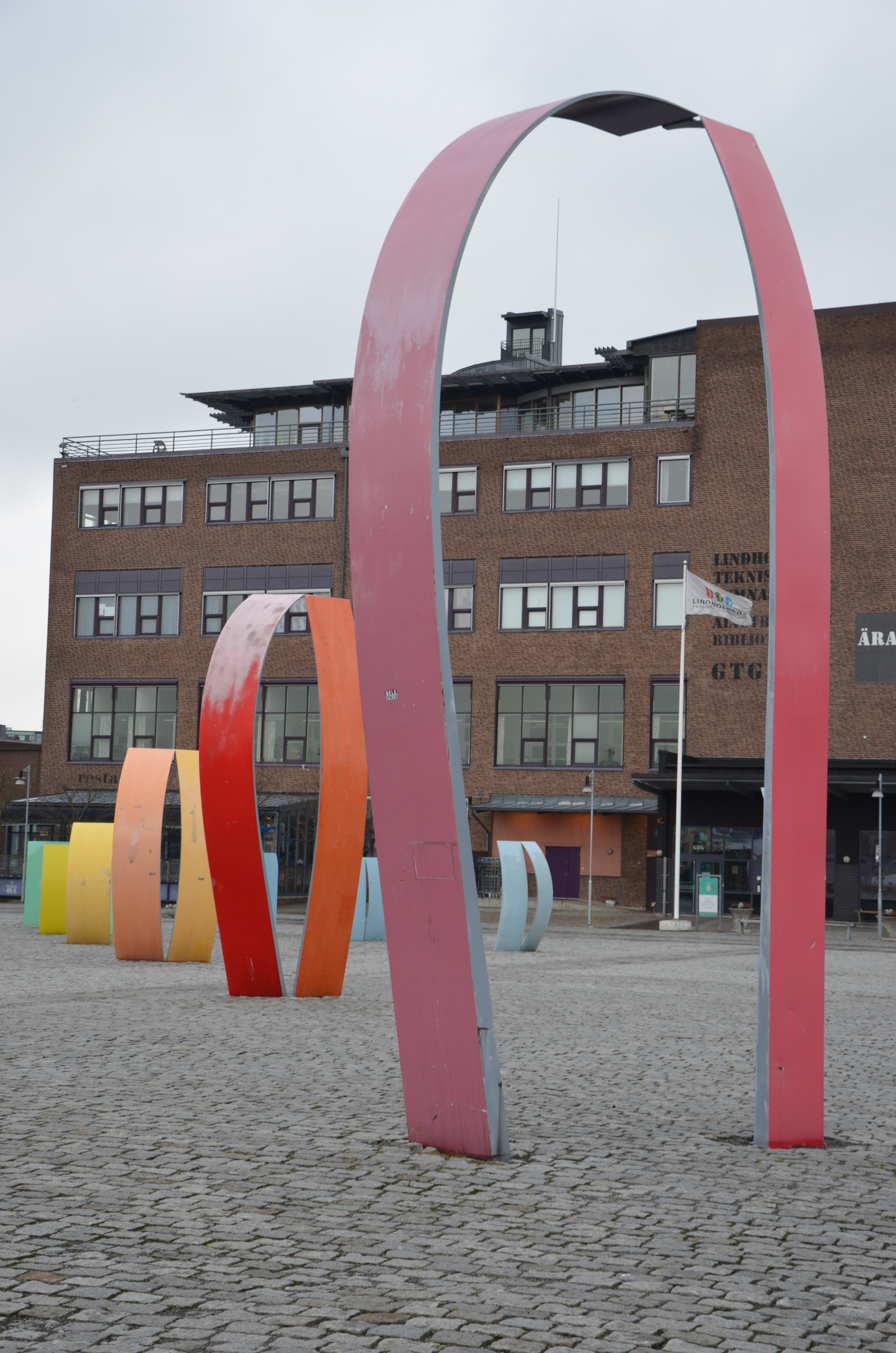
The Sequence of Di-eder, in Lindholmen in Göteborg (Hans Wretling)

Apart from a few months studying at the Otte Skölds målarskola (1936–37) (now Pernby School of Painting) in Stockholm and some months at the Ateneum School in Helsinki, Finland (1937–1938), Gert Marcus was an autodidact. He became one of Sweden's most consistent concretists, even if he distanced himself from all "isms". Marcus lived most of his life in Stockholm but he worked for long periods in France in Menton, L’Esconil (Brittany) and Paris, and in Italy at Massa-Carrara.

Early in his life he was influenced by Paul Cézanne's attempts in determining how to create space and volume without the use of Renaissance perspective. This led to Marcus’ creating a color theory – which he was faithful to during his entire artistic career. Work on volume and color opened for him a road to bas-reliefs and eventually to sculpture. In 1955 he met the artists Michel Seuphor, Nicolas Schöffer, and Georges Vantongerloo in Paris. With the last, Marcus developed a long and profitable friendship.

In the 1950s, Gert Marcus was awarded several commissions, including that for a wall mosaic in Sankt Mikaels kapell in Mora in 1954, another mosaic in Stockholm's polishus in 1957, a choir wall in the church of Vantör in Stockholm, and a wall mosaic in finely crushed glass in Sergelteatern in 1959. Marcus was frequently commissioned to provide sculptural monuments in public spaces in Sweden and even to design the interior of the Bagarmossen metro station in Stockholm.

In 1999 Gert Marcus was awarded the Prince Eugen medal by the King of Sweden for "outstanding artistic achievement."

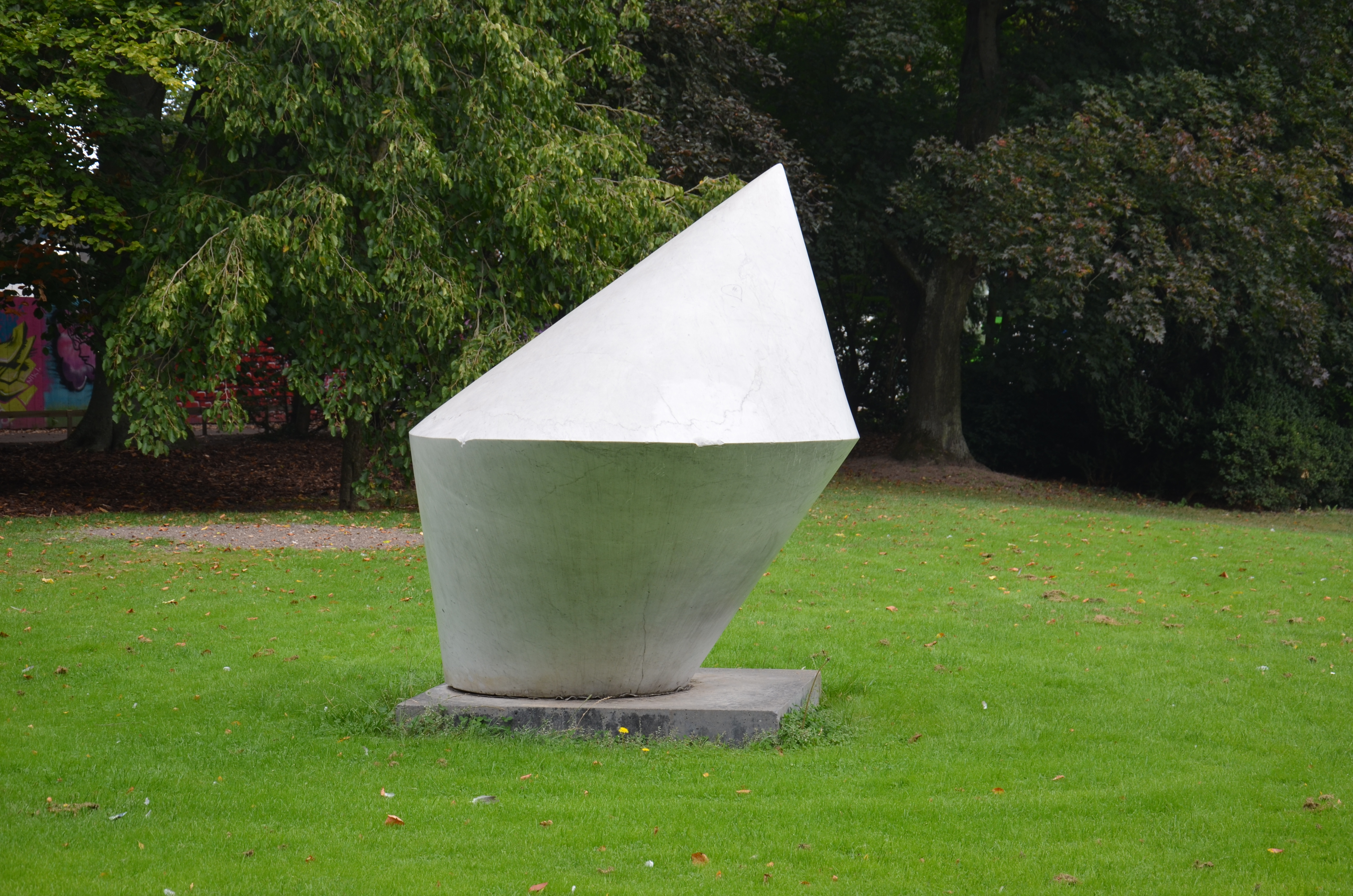
Body and Line, in Lund (Gert Marcus)

Marcus married twice, first to Anne-Marie Söderlund, a marriage that lasted from 1945 to 1970 and produced two children, Anna and Claude and then, in 1977, to fellow sculptor Françoise Ribeyrolles-Marcus, with whom he fathered a second daughter, Aurelia.

He died in Stockholm on 23 December 2008.

== The "Initiative Marcus und Dahl" ==
In 2017 residents of Groß Borstel founded a new society, "Initiative Marcus und Dahl", with the goal of reviving interest in the work of Gert Marcus and Ingolf Dahl as well as other artists living or working, or having lived or worked, in Gross-Borstel. In 2018 a new street near the pre-World War II family home was named "Gert Marcus Strasse".

== Works by Gert Marcus ==
- "Rymdkors vägg", sgraffito, Sankt Mikael Chapel in Mora (Sweden), 1954
- Wall in stone mosaic, east entrance hall at the Police Headquarters, Stockholm (Sweden), 1957
- "Korsmosaik", Vantör Church, Stockholm, 1958–59
- "Homage till Harpo Marx", mosaic of finely crushed glass, foyer of the Sergel Theatre, Stockholm, 1959. The theatre does not exist anymore. The wall has been detached and is now owned by the art dealer Åmells. The wall needs a new location.
- Wall relief in the refectory of KTH Royal Institute of Technology, and two sculptures in concrete by the entrance, Stockholm, 1962
- "Kropp och ytor", 1965, black diabase, sculpture parc, Museum of Sketches, Lund
- "En inre delning", Santa Elena marble and diabase, Karlaplan in Stockholm, 1965–66
- "Sfärisk struktur", 1967, later bought by the city of Borlänge (Sweden).
- "Di-edersekvensen"[4], twelve parts, lackered steel, 1968–69, erected in 1994 on the Lindholmen quay in Gothenburg (Sweden)
- Exteriors of apartment buildings in Västra Flemingsberg, lackered aluminium, Huddinge (Sweden), 1973
- "Kolonnens kvadratur". Has been bought by Pharmacia in Uppsala (Sweden), 1979
- "Kropp och linje", carrara marble, 1982, Stadsparken in Lund (now destroyed)
- "Vitt rår", entrance hall of the District Law Court, Östersund (Sweden), 1983
- "Min kvadratur", carrara marble, 1983–84, Hjelmsjöfabrikens park in Örkelljunga (Sweden)
- "Färgrum och gränslinjer", painted aluminium, 1984, first erected in S:t Görans sjukhus in Stockholm and then moved to the main entry of Karolinska in Huddinge.
- "Cubo centrifugo-centripeto", carrara marble, 1984–85, the sculpture parc of Norrköping Museum
- "Tre Enheter", carrara marble, The Peace Park, Eilat, Israel, 1989
- Bagarmossen subway station in Stockholm, laminated glass and marble floor, 1994
- Di-eder, lackered steel, 1966–68, erected in 1998 at Sergels Torg, Stockholm
- Cirkelns expansion, 1991, carrara marble, Skissernas museum's sculpture parc in Lund, 1999
- Sfera centripeta-centrifuga, 1971, marble, erected in 2000 in Turano Lodigiano, Lombardy, Italy. Does not exist anymore.
- Vertikal enhet, St Sigfrid cemetery, Borås (Sweden), 2005

Examples of work by Gert Marcus can be found at:

- Moderna Museet, Stockholm
- Nationalmuseum, Stockholm
- Konstmuseum, Norrköping
- Konstmuseum, Göteborg
- Skissernas museum, Lund

A selection of solo exhibitions of Marcus work

- Galerie Colette Allendy, Paris, 1956 and 1960
- Liljevachs Konsthall, Stockholm, 1965
- Stockholms Stadsmuseum, 1968
- Galerie Charley Chevalier, Paris, 1975
- Castello Malaspina, retrospective, Massa-Carrara, Italy, 1981
- Norrköpings Konstmuseum, Norrköping, 1984
- Galerie Konstruktiv Tendens, Stockholm, 1986, 1989, 1993,1998, 2005
- Galerie Ars Nova, Göteborg, 1990, 1994
- Moderna Museet, Stockholm, 1986
- Göteborgs Konstmuseum, Gothenburg, 1994
- Galerie Weiller, Stockholm, 1999
- Sofiero Slottspark, Helsingborg, 2002–2003

Posthumous:

- Konstakademien, retrospective, Stockholm, 2013
- Åmells, Stockholm, 2015
