= Michael Benedikt (poet) =

American poet (1935–2007)

Michael Benedikt (May 26, 1935 – February 9, 2007) was an American poet, editor, and literary critic.

== Biography ==
Michael Benedikt was born in 1935 in New York City. He received his B.A. from New York University and earned a master's degree in English & Comparative Literature from Columbia University.

Prior to publishing his first collection of poetry, Benedikt co-edited three anthologies of 20th-Century Poetic Theatre from abroad. His anthology of twentieth-century American plays was issued in 1968. He was also the editor of two landmark anthologies of twentieth-century poetry: The Poetry of Surrealism in 1974; and The Prose Poem: An International Anthology in 1976. Benedikt was Poetry Editor for The Paris Review from 1975 to 1978. His editorial selections are represented in The Paris Review Anthology in 1990. Occasionally active as a critic/journalist, he is also a former Associate Editor of Art News and Art International. His literary criticism has appeared in Poetry and The American Book Review.

Poems as yet uncollected in book form have appeared in the 1990s in such literary magazines as Agni, Iowa Review, Michigan Quarterly Review, The New Republic, The Paris Review, and Partisan Review. Early work appeared in the avant garde little magazine Nomad at the beginning of the 1960s. His honors include a New York State Council for The Arts Grant, a Guggenheim Foundation Fellowship, and an NEA Fellowship. He has taught at Bennington, Sarah Lawrence, Vassar, Hampshire Colleges, and at Boston University.

== Work ==
=== Poetry ===
- Time is a Toy: The Selected Poems of Michael Benedikt (University of Akron Press, 2014)
- The Badminton at Great Barrington; or, Gustave Mahler & The Chattanooga Choo-Choo (University of Pittsburgh Press, 1980)
- Night Cries (prose poems, 1976)
- Mole Notes (prose poems, 1971)
- Sky (1970)
- The Body (1968)

=== Anthologies ===
- Modern French Theatre: The Avant-Garde, Dada, & Surrealism (1964, co-edited with George E. Wellwarth)
- Post-War German Theater (1967)
- Theatre Experiment; An Anthology of American Plays (1968)
- Modern Spanish Theater (1969, co-edited with George E. Wellwarth)
- The Poetry of Surrealism (1974)
- The Prose Poem: An International Anthology (1976)
