= Nomad (magazine) =

American literary magazine

Nomad was an avant-garde literary magazine edited and published in Los Angeles between 1959 and 1962 by Anthony Linick and Donald Factor (the son of Max Factor Jr.). The two were particularly drawn to the poetry and writing style of the Beat Generation, who wrote of their own frequently chaotic lives.

Nomad published work by later famous authors and poets such as:

- John Ashbery
- Michael Benedikt
- Charles Bukowski
- William Burroughs
- Gregory Corso
- Robert Creeley
- Allen Ginsberg
- LeRoi Jones
- Robert Kelly
- Kenneth Koch
- Denise Levertov
- Michael McClure
- Frank O’Hara
- John Perreault
- Paul Raboff
- Gilbert Sorrentino
- Gary Snyder
- Diane Wakoski
- Lew Welch
- Philip Whalen
- Louis Zukofsky

Nomad was an early publisher of Charles Bukowski's work, featuring two of his poems in its inaugural issue, which predated Bukowski's first book, Flower Fist and Bestial Wail (1960). Bukowski's poem So Much for the Knifers, So Much for the Bellowing Dawns was used as a prologue to Nomad's "Manifesto" issue, because the poem epitomized the anti-academic tone that Linick and Factor wanted to feature.

The "Manifesto" issue provided a format for statements of literary philosophy. The issue included one of Bukowski's best-known essays, Manifesto: A Call for Our Own Critics. It also featured, among others, a contribution by William Burroughs, who contributed a selection from Minutes to Go.

In the magazine's last issue, Nomad/New York, a special double issue (10/11, Autumn 1962), Factor wrote one of the first essays on what would become known as pop art, though he did not use the term. The essay, "Four Artists," focused on Roy Lichtenstein, James Rosenquist, Jim Dine, and Claes Oldenburg. At the time, Factor was a collector of the work of these artists and their contemporaries.

The same issue saw John Bernard Myers, co-owner of the Tibor de Nagy Gallery, introduce the phrase "New York School of Poetry" as a genre distinct from the broader "New York Poets." He categorized the common traits of Ashbery, Kenward Elmslie, Barbara Guest, Koch, O'Hara, James Schuyler, and others, as constituting a "New York School".

Linick and Factor had equal responsibility when it came to deciding what to include in the magazine. Factor paid for publication, and the London printers were Villiers Publications, the same firm that printed Lawrence Ferlinghetti's famous City Lights Pocket Poets Series, including Ginsberg's Howl. Linick was responsible for all correspondence and solicited manuscripts from poets that he and Factor liked. They managed subscriptions, proofread, and wrote all editorials within the magazine and contributor section.

Among the authors Nomad published, one stands out for his work in law, not poetry. Charles Black, who had earned a master's degree in "Old and Middle English Literature" from Yale University, wrote a thesis on Percy Bysshe Shelley as a translator of verse, and became a teacher of law at Yale. He is best known for his role in Brown v. Board of Education.

Linick and Factor stopped publishing Nomad after eleven issues. A twelfth issue had been prepared, but was never released.
