= William Dehning =

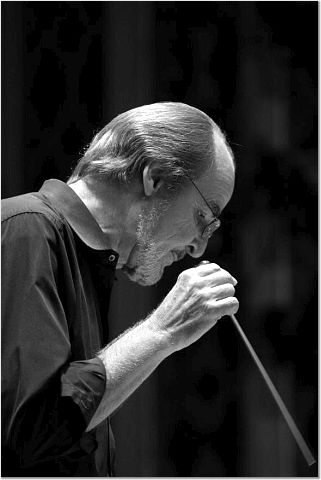

Background information
- Born: William John Dehning; August 13, 1942; Aitkin, Minnesota, United States
- Died: June 23, 2017 Michigan, United States
- Genres: Classical, Choral
- Occupation: Conductor
- Instruments: Trumpet, French Horn
- Years active: 1968-2017
- Formerly of: USC Thornton Chamber Choir, guest conductor
- Website: www.williamdehning.com

Dr. William John Dehning (August 13, 1942 – June 23, 2017) was an American conductor, teacher, and author who spent almost his entire career in the collegiate realm. He was known primarily for his work as conductor of the University of Southern California Thornton Chamber Choir and as author of the book, Chorus Confidential: Decoding the Secrets of the Choral Art, published in 2003. Under his leadership, the Thornton Chamber Choir won seven prizes in international European competitions, including Grand Prizes in Varna, Bulgaria and Tours, France. After winning the choral competition with the USC Chamber Choir in Bulgaria, Dehning was awarded the Judges' Conducting Prize by a panel of ten judges in 1999. During his tenure, the ensemble also appeared at American Choral Directors Association (ACDA) conventions six times, including nationals in 2001 and 2005. They also completed a tour of East Asia in 2006, performing at the National Concert Hall in Taipei. While at Northern Michigan University from 1970 to 1972, Dehning was the founder of the Marquette Choral Society, which is still active. Later, he was from 1985 to 1995 the founder/conductor of the California Choral Company, a semi-professional chamber chorus that attained a reputation in Europe as well as in the United States. As Chairman of the USC Department of Choral Music (now retired), Dehning was awarded the first annual Dean's Faculty Award for Excellence in Teaching, and he was also the 2007 recipient of the Thornton School's Ramo Award. Dehning was one of four founding members of the National Collegiate Choral Organization (NCCO), which held its first national conference in San Antonio in 2006.

== Biography ==
Born in Aitkin, Minnesota, Dehning moved to Los Angeles in 1956 where he attended high school. He was first admitted to UCLA's engineering school, but eventually graduated with a Bachelor of Arts degree in music. At UCLA, Dehning sang with Roger Wagner and Paul Salamunovich. Immediately following, Dehning enrolled at the University of Southern California, where he attained master's and doctoral degrees in church and choral music with highest honors. While there he studied with Charles C. Hirt, James Vail, Ingolf Dahl, Walter Ducloux, and Halsey Stevens. He also taught conducting and founded a chorus as an assistant in the department.

Dehning began his work as a full-time music professor in Marquette, Michigan, having been hired as Director of Choral Activities at Northern Michigan University in 1970. Shortly thereafter, he was hired by the University of the Pacific in Stockton, California, to head their choral program at the Conservatory of Music. He and his family spent twenty years in northern California (1972–1992).

In 1980, Dehning took his first sabbatical in England, where he observed and sang with John Alldis and the London Symphony Chorus and observed the John Alldis Choir. In 1988, Dehning took his second sabbatical in Germany where he lectured at Munich's Hochschule für Musik and spent time observing university and professional choruses in Munich and Stuttgart, including the Bavarian Radio Chorus and Helmuth Rilling's Gächinger Kantorei. Following a performance at an ACDA national convention with the California Choral Company in 1991, Dehning was asked by Morten Lauridsen, famed choral composer and Professor of composition at the University of Southern California, to audition for the position of Chair of Choral Music at USC. He accepted the position and went there in 1992.

His tenure at USC included numerous ACDA convention appearances, tours, and international competitions with the renowned USC Thornton Chamber Choir (originally named the USC Chamber Singers by its founder, Charles C. Hirt). While at USC, he resumed a long-standing relationship with Helmuth Rilling, preparing a number of choruses for Rilling's appearances in Los Angeles. In addition, he also prepared choruses for the Los Angeles Philharmonic and Los Angeles Chamber Orchestra. Dehning became a frequent visitor to South Korea—a country that cherishes choral music—where he has appeared often as guest conductor of professional choruses and clinician with numerous universities. In addition to appearances with professional choruses in Korea–including the National Chorus, the Bucheon City Chorus and the award-winning Pilgrim Mission Choir–he also worked as guest conductor of the Karlovy Vary Symphony in the Czech Republic.

Dehning retired as Chair of the Choral Music department at the University of Southern California in 2007 after fifteen years there. In recent years, the graduate student body grew under his leadership. He recruited colleagues such as Dr. Magen Solomon and Dr. Nicolas Strimple to aid in the instruction of the students. Although a versatile conductor of both choirs and orchestras, Dehning also established a reputation with his students as an effective teacher. After his retirement, he continued to do clinics, workshops, and master-classes, and to make appearances as guest conductor in the U.S. and abroad. In 2012, he was diagnosed with Foix-Alajouanine Syndrome - an arteriovenous malformation of the spinal cord affecting the lower half of the thoracic spine, causing him to commit to fewer guest conducting engagements. Until his death, he lived in Marquette, MI, with his wife, Erin Colwitz, a former student. She is currently the Director of Choirs at Northern Michigan University.

Dehning died on June 23, 2017, in Marquette, Michigan. He was 74 years old.

== Publications ==
- A Matter of Choice: Interpreting Choral Music; CreateSpace Independent Publishing Platform, 2012;
- Chorus Confidential: Decoding the Secrets of the Choral Art; Pavane Publishing, 2003;
- "Rehearsal: Profane Commandments for the Sacred Process", Tactus, Fall, 1987; reprints, 1988–2004;
- "Charles Hirt: A Matter of Style", Tactus, Fall, 1998;
- Monteverdi: Lagrime dell' Amato all' sepulchro dell' Amata, Alliance Music (performing edition), 1998;
- "Broadside", The Choral Journal, December, 1997

== Recordings ==
- Madrigal, compact disc, USC Chamber Choir, 1998
