= Anthony Linick =

American educator and author (born 1938)

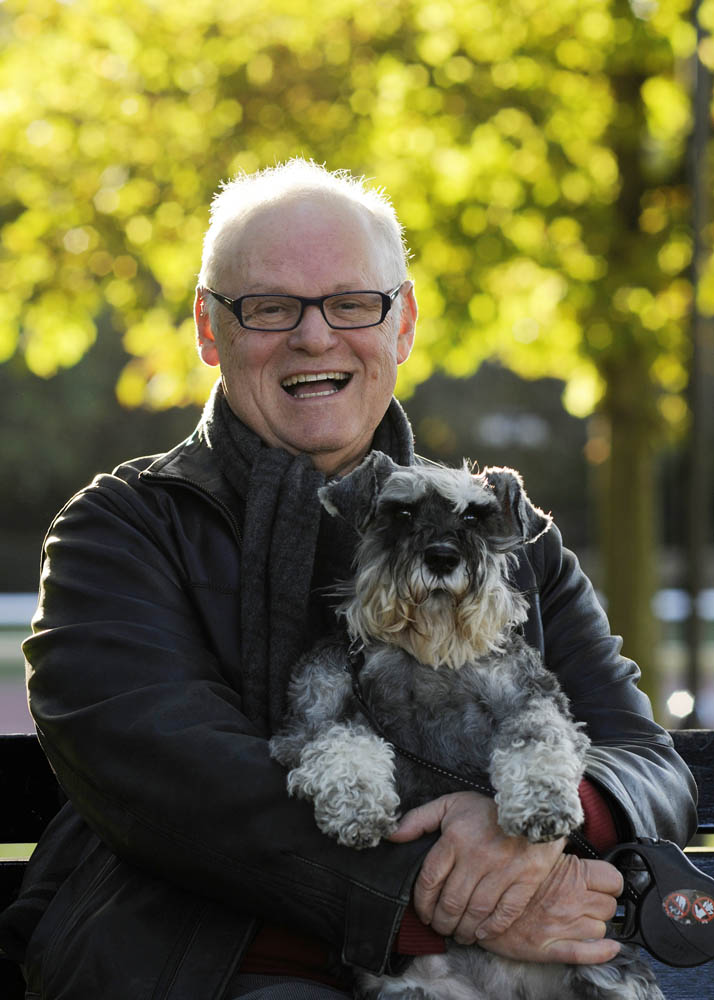
- Linick with Fritz, 2010
- Born: January 6, 1938 (age 88); Los Angeles, California, U.S.
- Occupation: Retired academic
- Spouse: Dorothy Judith Goldstone Linick (1940-2007)
- Writing career
- Language: English
- Genres: Biography, diarist, and other non-fiction
- Notable work: The Lives of Ingolf Dahl

Anthony Linick (born January 6, 1938) is an American educator and author.

== Early years ==
Linick was born in Los Angeles on January 6, 1938. His father, Leroy M. Linick, a screen story analyst at Metro-Goldwyn-Mayer, and his mother, née Etta Gordon, separated soon thereafter. Linick grew up in the household of his mother and her new husband, the composer and conductor Ingolf Dahl. Linick attended a number of public schools in Los Angeles, including Alexander Hamilton High School, and in 1955 he began a ten-year experience on the campus of University of California, Los Angeles (UCLA) in Westwood. In 1959 he received his B.A. in history and the following year he earned a general secondary teaching credential. In 1964 he completed a Ph.D. in history. He spent a final year in Los Angeles as an instructor in the UCLA history department.

== Editorship of Nomad ==
While an undergraduate Linick launched an American "little magazine", Nomad, working with his co-editor, Donald Factor (the son of Max Factor, Jr.), on a number of issues, including the 1962 finale, Nomad/New York. Linick had enjoyed a great interest in the burgeoning poetry scene for a number of years. Nomad offered a home to the early work of Charles Bukowski. Nomad's inaugural issue in 1959 featured several of Bukowski's poems. A year later, Nomad published one of Bukowski's best known essays, Manifesto: A Call for Own Critics.

Because of Nomad and his connections to avant garde poetry, Linick was present during the 1957 Howl trial in San Francisco. During summers spent in New York he also got to know many of the authors who dominated the anthologies in subsequent years. Knowing of his interest in such affairs, his mentor at UCLA, George Mowry, suggested he choose a dissertation topic from this world. The result was A History of the American Literary Avant-Garde Since World War II. In 2017 Linick published in Beat Scene magazine some of the original research for this dissertation, including responses to a questionnaire returned to him by Jack Kerouac, Allen Ginsberg, Gregory Corso, and Charles Bukowsky. The event was of particular interest to Beat scholar James Campbell, who wrote about Linick's article in The Times Literary Supplement.

== Academic life ==
In 1964 Linick married Dorothy Goldstone, another recent B.A. in history at UCLA, and the following year they moved to East Lansing, Michigan, where Linick had accepted an appointment as an assistant professor of humanities at Michigan State University (MSU). He was promoted to associate professor in 1970 and to Professor in 1975, and enjoyed many and varied teaching opportunities. Linick taught the basic year-long western civilization course, one combining history, literature, religion, philosophy and the arts–a year-long offering that was then required of every MSU student–as well as courses in literature for MSU's Justin Morrill College and courses in contemporary and Jewish culture. He led MSU's first overseas study program in Israel in 1977.

Increasingly, Linick's scholarly activities were concentrated in the field of popular culture, particularly television, then a new academic discipline, and he and Dorothy were participants in the first convention of the Popular Culture Association. Linick contributed two articles to the Journal of Popular Culture in the 1970s and made several additional presentations at Popular Cultural Association conventions thereafter. The focus of his research was on British popular culture, which he and his wife were able to experience first-hand with almost annual visits to London. Linick led an overseas study program there in 1970 and enjoyed two sabbatical leaves in London, one in 1973 and one in 1979–1980. In 1981 the couple moved to the U.K.

In 1982 Linick began a twenty-year tenure as a member of the faculty of the American School in London (ASL) in St John's Wood. There he taught courses for both the social studies and the English departments, moving permanently to the latter in 1988 and serving as its chair for the last eight years of his teaching career, 1994–2002. At ASL Linick specialized in courses in literature, American and European, and in writing. He served as the sponsor of the school newspaper for fourteen years and of the student council for a dozen years and worked on a number of occasions with the school's program of out-of-classroom activities, Alternatives. Dorothy Linick coordinated this program for a number of years as well and also taught film studies at ASL. Earlier she had served as student services director at the American College in London. She died in 2007, leaving behind a great deal of unpublished fiction. With the collaboration of her sister, Naomi Goldstone Tschoegl, Linick was able in 2017 to include on his website Dorothy's novel, Sight / Bites.

== Author ==
Following his retirement in 2002, Linick pursued a number of additional interests and to devote more time to writing. The Linicks had purchased their first Miniature Schnauzer, Bertie, in 1983 and their third, Fritz, in 2003. Finding himself a part of a lively dog scene in the park across the street (Maida Vale's Paddington Recreation Ground), he began to keep a daily journal of the activities of these dogs and their owners in 2004 – and in 2007 he published the first in a series entitled Life Among the Dog People of Paddington Rec. The series was still active as of 2015, earning its author an epithet as "The Pepys of Pups". In 2011 BBC Radio London, twice interviewed him on this project.

Linick also completed a lengthy biography of his stepfather, The Lives of Ingolf Dahl, which was published in 2008. He wrote the liner notes for Michael Tilson Thomas' anthology recording, Defining Dahl in 1995, and in 2011 he was asked to update the Dahl entry in the Grove Dictionary of American Music. Linick was also able to offer assistance to the musicologist Dorothy L. Crawford in her two books on the Los Angeles musical world.

A second passion, one that traces back to the inspiration offered by Dahl to the young Linick and his school friends, was for the footpath. As early as 1974 Linick began a long series of walks on the extensive network of paths in England, the Channel Islands, Scotland, Wales, and Ireland. Here too he kept a detailed daily journal and these served as the source for A Walker's Alphabet: Adventures on the Long-distance footpaths of Great Britain (2010).

After publishing four volumes in the Paddington Rec cycle, Linick decided in 2013 to offer subsequent editions on his own web site. He also posted entries and photographs there covering the almost 5000 miles of walks he has completed in Britain and Ireland.

== Interests ==
He lives in London and maintains his walking and park journals. He is a member of the South West Way and the Offa's Dyke Path Associations, the Rambler's Association, the Long Distance Walkers Association, and the National Trust, and he is a supporter of the Dogs Trust and a friend of both the Royal Academy and the Tate Gallery.

== Editorial work and articles ==
- Co-editor (with Donald Factor), Nomad, Numbers 1 through 10/11 (1959–1962)
- Editor, Nomad/New York, an anthology of the New York avant-garde poets (London: Villiers Publications, 1962)
- “Principles of a Humanities Orientation to Literary Instruction,” The Humanities Journal, Vol. III, No. 4 (Spring, 1970)
- “Magic and Identity in Television Programming,” Journal of Popular Culture, Vol. III, No. 4 (Spring, 1970). First published online in 2004.
- “Britannia Rules The Airwaves: Television Programming in Transatlantic Perspective,” Journal of Popular Culture, Vol. VIII, No. 4 (Spring, 1974). First published online in 2004.
- "Interview with the avant-garde", Beat Scene (Winter 2017), #88, pp. 11–25.
- Co-author, “The American Issues Forum, A Rural Perspective” (Washington, D.C., The National Grange, 1975).
- “Strong Opinions: the Modern British Guidebook,” Landscape, Vol. 23, No, 2 (1979).
- “The Music of Ingolf Dahl,” liner notes for Defining Dahl, The music of Ingolf Dahl, Decca Record Company, 1995.
- “Power, Glory and the King James Bible,” Accents, The Magazine of the American School in London, Fall, 2005
- “The Dogs of Paddington Rec,” London Dog Tails, March/April 2008.
- "Interview with the avant-garde", Beat Scene (Winter 2017), #88, pp. 11–25.
- "The long road north", Beat Scene (Spring 2018), #89, pp. 29–30.
- "Dennis Hopper – Poet", Beat Scene (Spring 2021), #100, pp. 10–13.
- "A Nomad in New York." Beat Scene(Late Summer 2022), #105, pp. 35–39.

== Books ==
- The Lives of Ingolf Dahl (Bloomington: AuthorHouse, 2008) ISBN 978-1-4389-1401-5 (hc); ISBN 978-1-4343-8003-6 (sc)
- A Walker’s Alphabet: Adventures on the long-distance footpaths of Great Britain (Bloomington: AuthorHouse, 2010) ISBN 978-1-4520-7299-9 (sc)

The dogs of Paddington Rec series

- Strictly Come Barking (Bloomington: AuthorHouse, 2008) ISBN 978-1-4343-0644-9 (sc); ISBN 978-1-4343-0645-6 (hc)
- Have I Got Dogs For You! (Bloomington: AuthorHouse, 2010) ISBN 978-1-4490-6319-1 (sc)
- DSI: Dog Scene Investigation (Bloomington: AuthorHouse, 2011) ISBN 978-1-4567-8069-2 (sc); ISBN 978-1-4567-8070-8 (ebk)
- A Doggy Day in London Town (Bloomington: AuthorHouse, 2012) ISBN 978-1-4772-2606-3 (sc); ISBN 978-1-4772-2607-0 (e)
