= Frustberg House =

Coordinates: 53.6094°N 9.9729°E

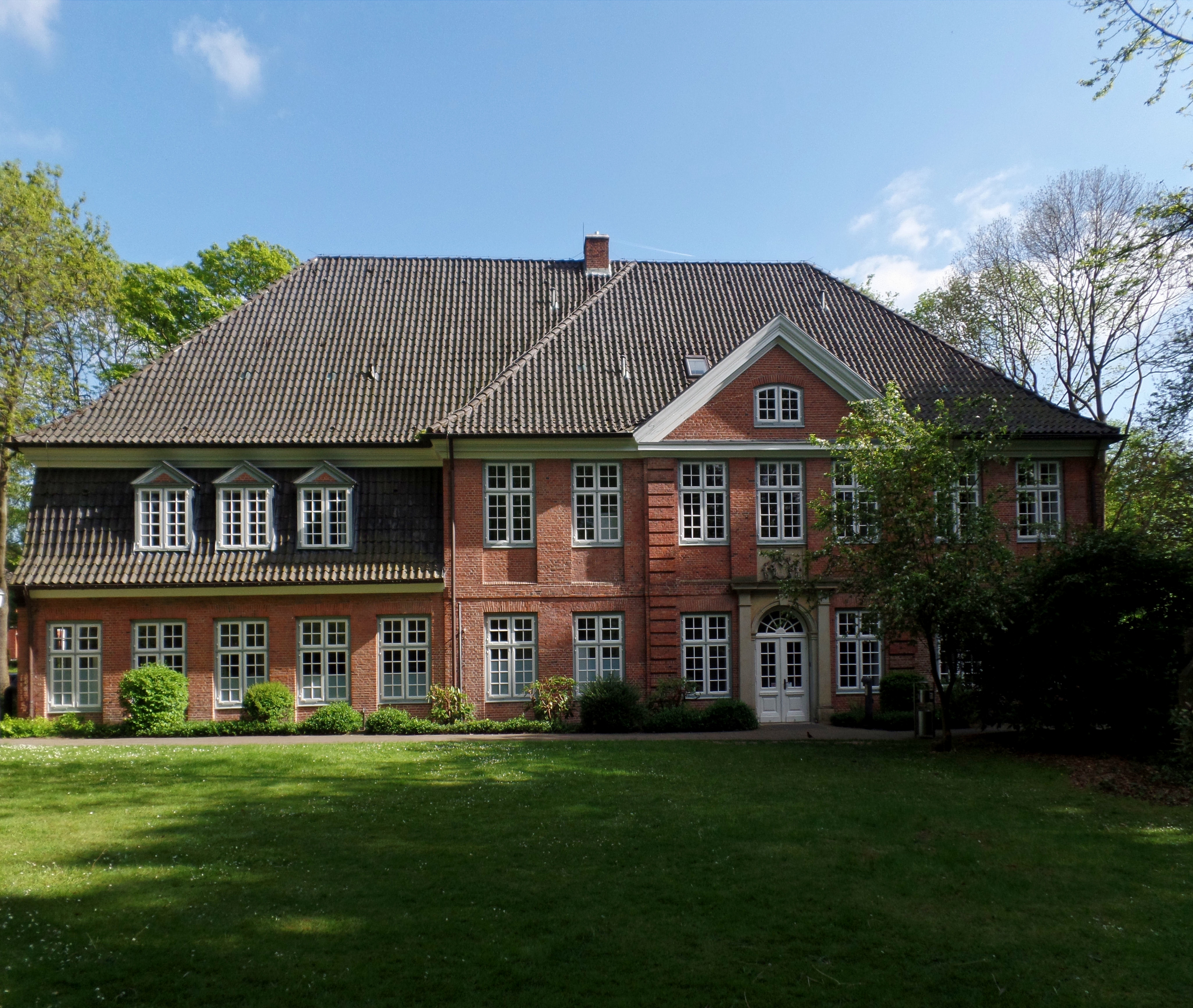
The Frustberg manor house, built in 1703

The Frustberg House, also known as the Tiefbrunn House, is a former property and a baroque brick manor house at Frustberg in the Hamburg borough of Groß Borstel. The property became a summer residence for wealthy Hamburg citizens from 1651. The current house was built in the early 18th century by the cloth merchant Eybert Tiefbrunn, and his coat of arms is still found over the main entrance door, with the year 1703 inscribed. The building is a rare example of a baroque brick building from the era. In the 19th century, the property included an estate of 605 hectare (6050 decare) land, and the manor house was surrounded by 7 hectare (70 decare) park.

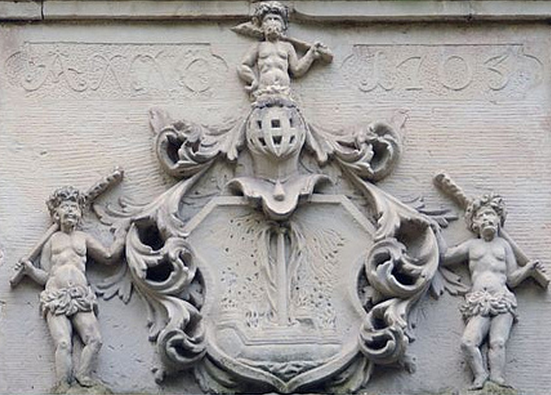
Coat of arms of Eybert Tiefbrunn over the main entrance

From 1793 to 1823, the manor house was owned by the Berenberg/Gossler banking family and was well known as a meeting place of Hamburg high society with many famous regular guests such as Gebhard Leberecht von Blücher and Philipp Otto Runge. It served as the summer residence of Elisabeth Gossler née Berenberg, the matriarch of the family. Her, at that time deceased, husband was Johann Hinrich Gossler, a great-grandson of Eybert Tiefbrunn, for whom the house was built a century earlier.

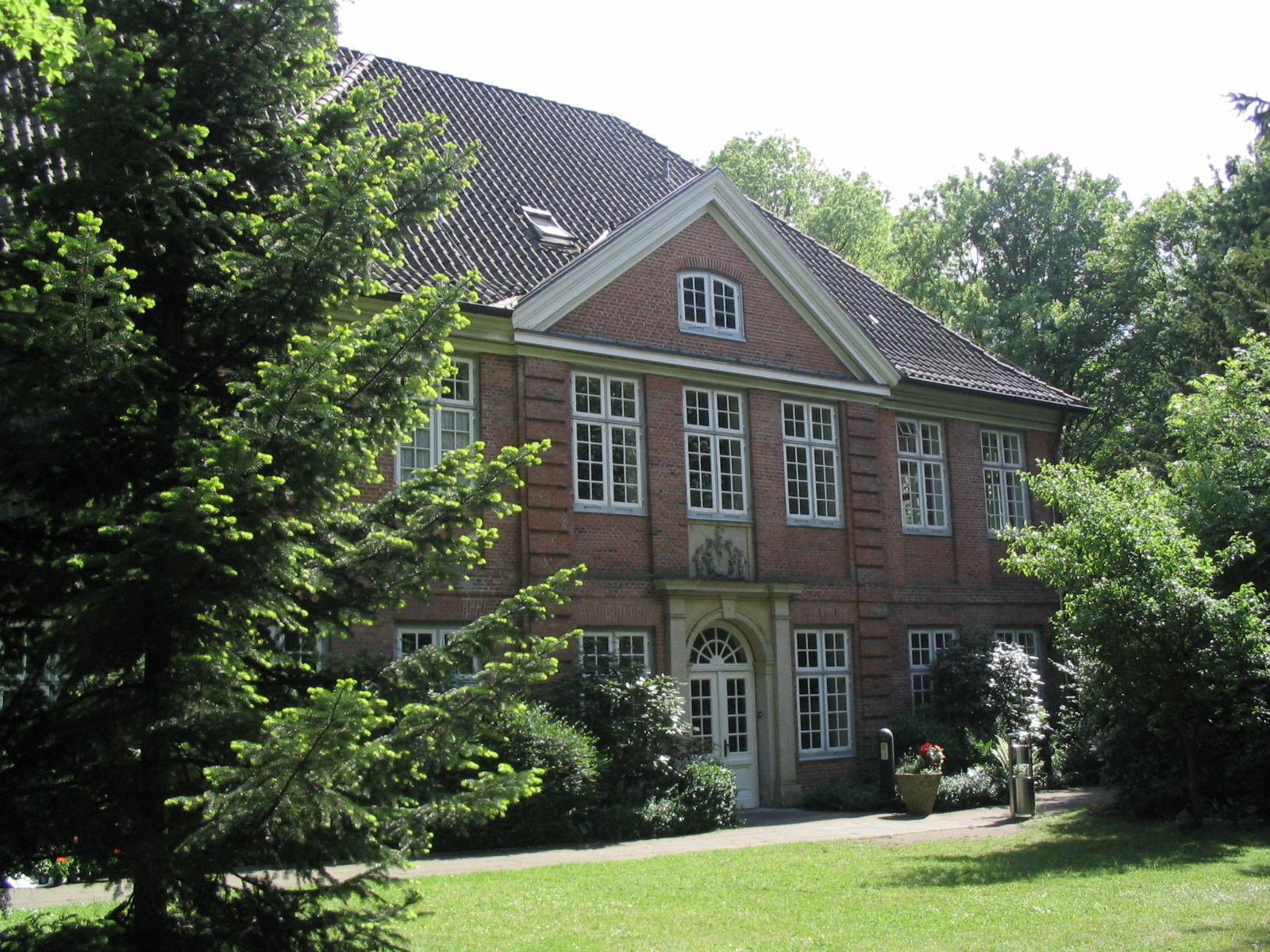
The Frustberg manor house

In 1823, the Gossler family sold the property to Wilhelm Schröder, who was married to Salomon Heine's eldest daughter Fanny. Their grandson Otto Nanne owned the property from 1872 to 1906, when he sold it to the factory owner August Herbst. Due to financial difficulties, Herbst sold the property to the Hamburg government in 1928–29. Since 1937, the manor house has been listed as a cultural heritage site. The park had by 1957 been reduced to 4800 m^{2}. The manor house is traditionally known as the Frustberg House. The house was officially given the name Stavenhagenhaus in honour of the poet Fritz Stavenhagen in 1962, with a ceremony presided over by Helmut Schmidt. However, Stavenhagen has no association with the house's history and the building is also referred to as the Frustberg House or as the Tiefbrunn House. The name Gossler House has also been used. The building is used for cultural events such as concerts.
