= Groß Borstel =

- Quarter of Hamburg
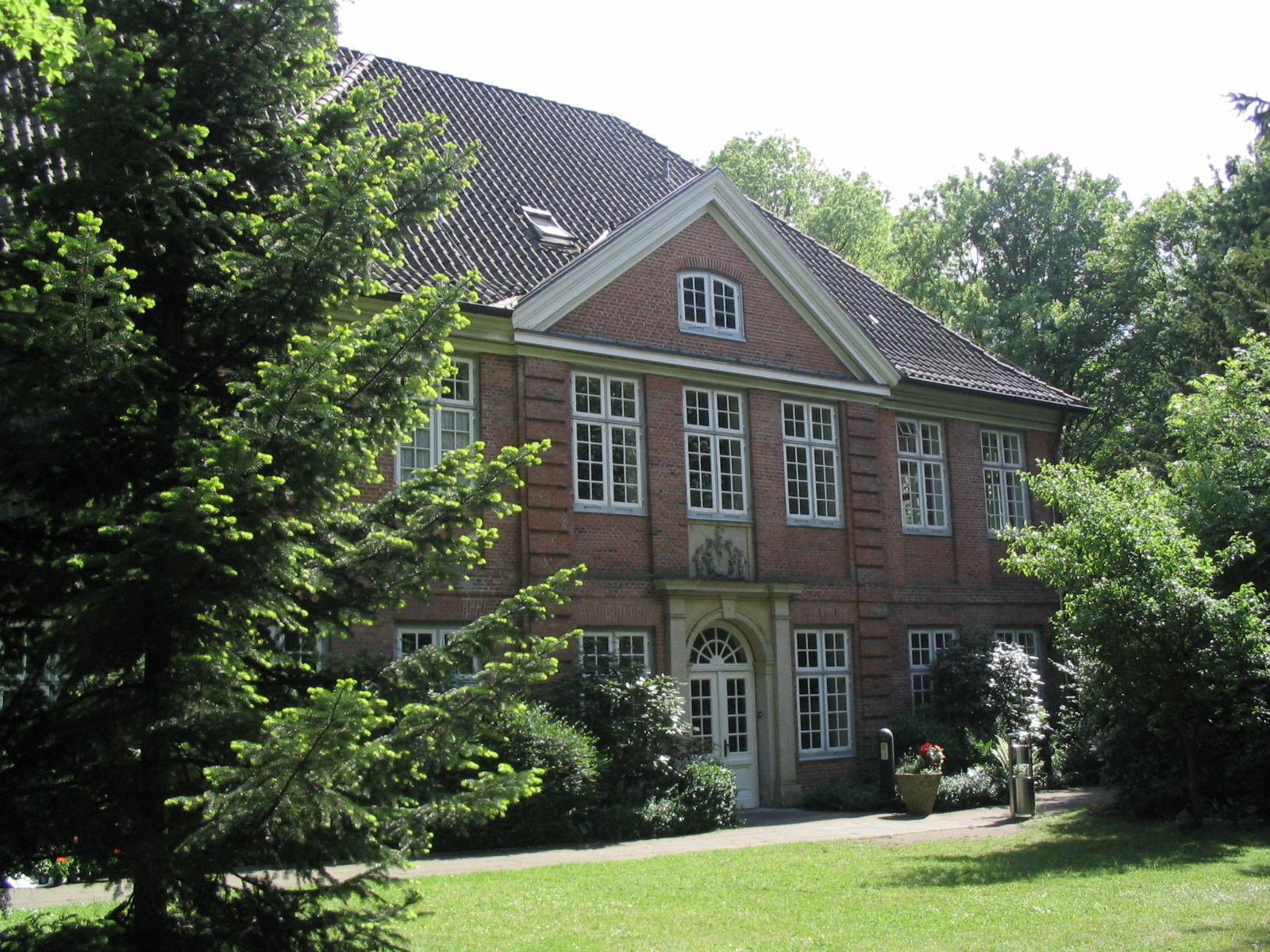
- Manor house of Stavenhagenhaus

- Location of Groß Borstel in Hamburg
- Interactive map of Groß Borstel
- Location within Germany Location within Hamburg
- Coordinates: 53.61366°N 9.98259°E
- Country: Germany
- State: Hamburg
- City: Hamburg
- Borough: Hamburg-Nord

Area
  - Total: 4.5 km^{2} (1.7 sq mi)

Population (2024-12-31)
  - Total: 10,939
  - Density: 2,400/km^{2} (6,300/sq mi)
- Time zone: UTC+01:00 (CET)
  - Summer (DST): UTC+02:00 (CEST)
- Dialling codes: 040
- Vehicle registration: HH

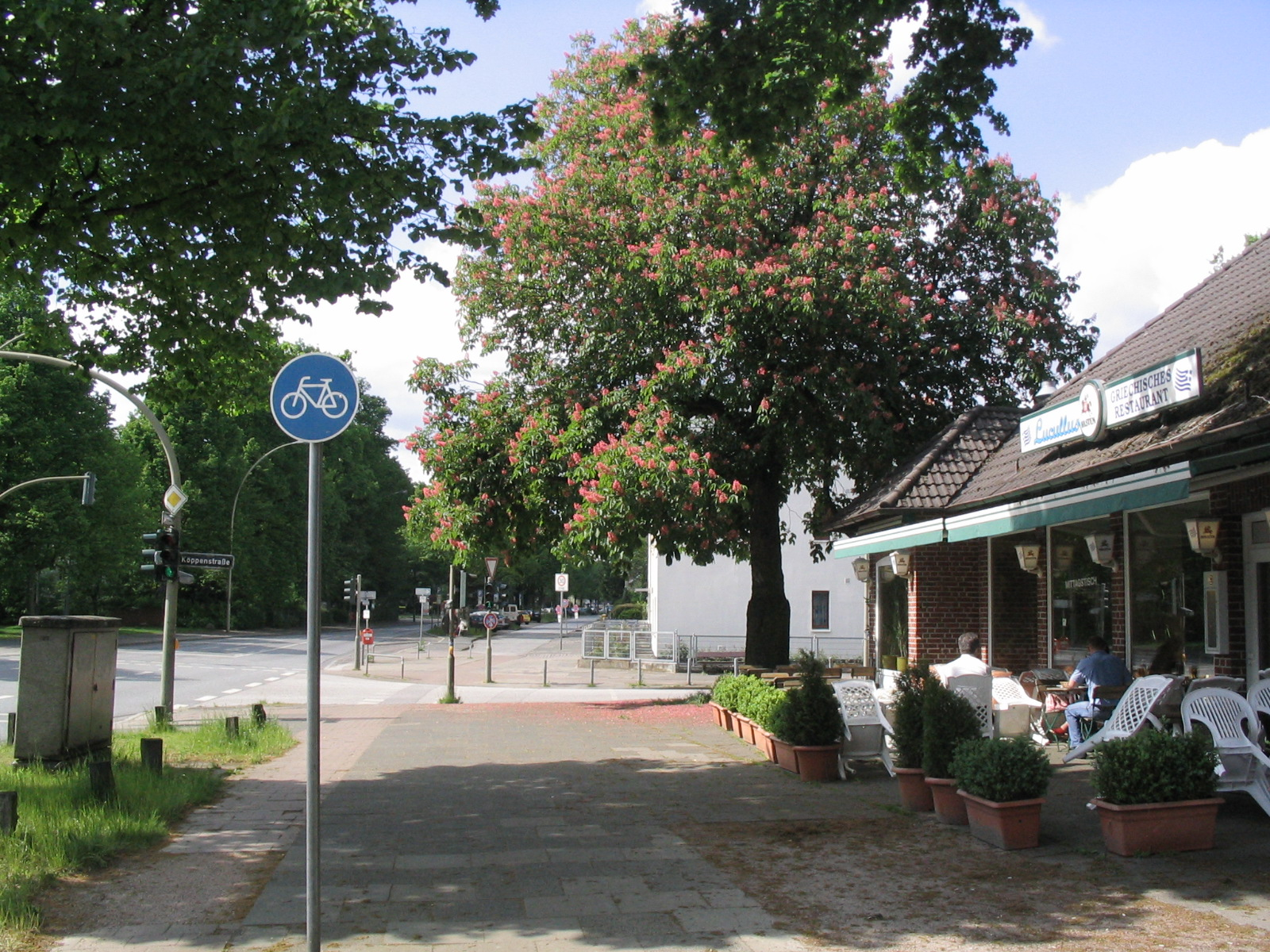
Borsteler Chaussee, a main street of the quarter

Groß Borstel (German pronunciation: [ˌɡʁoːs ˈbɔʁstl̩], lit. 'Great Borstel') is a quarter of Hamburg, Germany, in the borough of Hamburg-Nord. It is located north of the Eppendorf quarter and south of Hamburg Airport. Near Groß Borstel, the neighbourhood of Klein Borstel, which is not an official quarter, can be found.

== Geography ==
Groß Borstel borders the quarters of Fuhlsbüttel, Ohlsdorf, Alsterdorf, Lokstedt and Niendorf. The Tarpenbek stream flows through Groß Borstel and, in the Hamburg quarter of Eppendorf, into River Alster. The swamp of Eppendorfer Moor is located in the quarter.

== History ==
Groß Borstel was first recorded in the 11th century. The former village can also be found on maps and in documents as Burstolde, Burstelde, Borstel, Bossel, Calebostel and Kahle Borstel. The name derives from Bur, meaning house, and stel, meaning place.

The early 18th century Frustberg House, today known as Stavenhagenhaus, is located in the quarter.

Groß Borstel was incorporated into Hamburg in 1913.

In March 2023, seven people including the gunman were killed and eight others injured in a mass shooting at a Jehovah's Witnesses center on Deelböge street.

== Politics ==
These are the results of Groß Borstel in the Hamburg state election:

Election	SPD	Greens	CDU	Left	AfD	FDP	Others
2020	39,2 %	27,0 %	9,3 %	8,7 %	5,2 %	4,8 %	5,8 %
2015	48,3 %	12,8 %	14,0 %	8,0 %	5,5 %	7,5 %	3,9 %
2011	52,2 %	11,5 %	18,8 %	6,7 %	–	6,6 %	4,3 %
2008	34,6 %	9,8 %	42,1 %	5,9 %	–	5,2 %	2,4 %
