= Timeline of Hamburg =

Coordinates: 53.565278°N 10.001389°E

The following is a timeline of the history of the city of Hamburg, Germany.

== Prehistory and early settlement ==
- c. 13,000 BCE – People are living in the area of present-day Hamburg by the end of the Paleolithic period.
- 4th–3rd millennium BCE – Neolithic farming communities sometimes settle on the higher ground between the Alster and Elbe rivers; pottery and a stone axe from this period have been found at present-day Domplatz.
- 7th–8th century CE – A Saxon settlement develops on this higher ground, up to 15 m (49 ft) above the surrounding lowlands.
- 8th century CE – The settlement is fortified with a defensive ditch and wooden barrier.

== Early medieval Hamburg ==
- Early 9th century – The fortified settlement develops into the Hammaburg, with a settlement of craftspeople and merchants and an early harbour.
- 831–834 – Hamburg becomes the seat of a Christian diocese and a base for missions into northern Europe. Ansgar, a Benedictine monk and missionary, becomes its first bishop.
- 845 – Vikings attack Hamburg, destroying the settlement, its fortifications and church. Ansgar and other residents flee.
- c. 900 – A new and larger fortification is built at the Hammaburg site, and the settlement and harbour continue to develop.
- 10th century – The new Hammaburg grows to about 130 m (430 ft) across, with a population of only a few hundred people.
- 1021–1023 – The Neue Burg is built southwest of the Hammaburg near the present-day Nikolaifleet, becoming a new fortified centre. Excavated timbers from its walls allow its construction to be dated to between 1021 and 1023.
- Early 11th century – The Hammaburg is abandoned as the Neue Burg becomes the main fortified centre. A new defensive earthwork, the Heidenwall, is built across the eastern side of the settlement.

== High medieval Hamburg ==
- 1072 – Hamburg is attacked and badly damaged during an uprising by the Obotrites, a Slavic people living east of the city.
- Early 12th century – New residents arrive as Hamburg recovers. Political control passes to the counts of Schauenburg and Holstein.
- 1188 – Count Adolf III of Schauenburg establishes the Neustadt, or "new town", beside the older settlement. Merchants and craftspeople are encouraged to settle there with trading, market and tax privileges, helping Hamburg develop as a port and trading centre.
- 1189 – A charter dated 7 May and attributed to Frederick Barbarossa grants Hamburg important trading rights, including freedom from customs duties on the lower Elbe. The surviving charter is a 13th-century forgery made to record and expand Hamburg's claimed privileges. Its date is still used to mark the traditional birthday of the Port of Hamburg.

== Prior to 16th century ==
- 1189 - St. Peter's Church built (approximate date).
- 1190 – Alster dam installed.
- 1201 – Hamburg occupied by forces of Valdemar II of Denmark.
- 1223 – Archbishopric relocated from Hamburg to Bremen.
- 1241 – Lübeck-Hamburg alliance established.
- 1248 – Fire.
- 1256 – St. Catherine's Church active (approximate date).
- 1284 – 5 August: Fire.
- 1286 – 24 April: acquires rights to maintain permanent fire on Neuwerk.
- 1299 – 1 November: allowed to build a fortified tower, the new work (Neuwerk).
- 1310 – completion of the Great Tower Neuwerk.
- 1329 – St. Mary's Cathedral consecrated.
- 1350 – Black Death.
- 1356 – Matthiae-Mahlzeit (feast) begins.
- 1375 – Grocers' Guild formed.
- 1390 – Public clock installed (approximate date).
- 1410 – Constitution of Hamburg established.
- 1412 – 1412 Unterelbe flood.
- 1418 – St. Peter's Church rebuilt (approximate date).
- 1479 – Staats- und Universitätsbibliothek Hamburg (public library) established in the Town Hall.
- 1491 – Printing press in operation.
- 1500 – City expands its borders.

== 16th–18th centuries ==
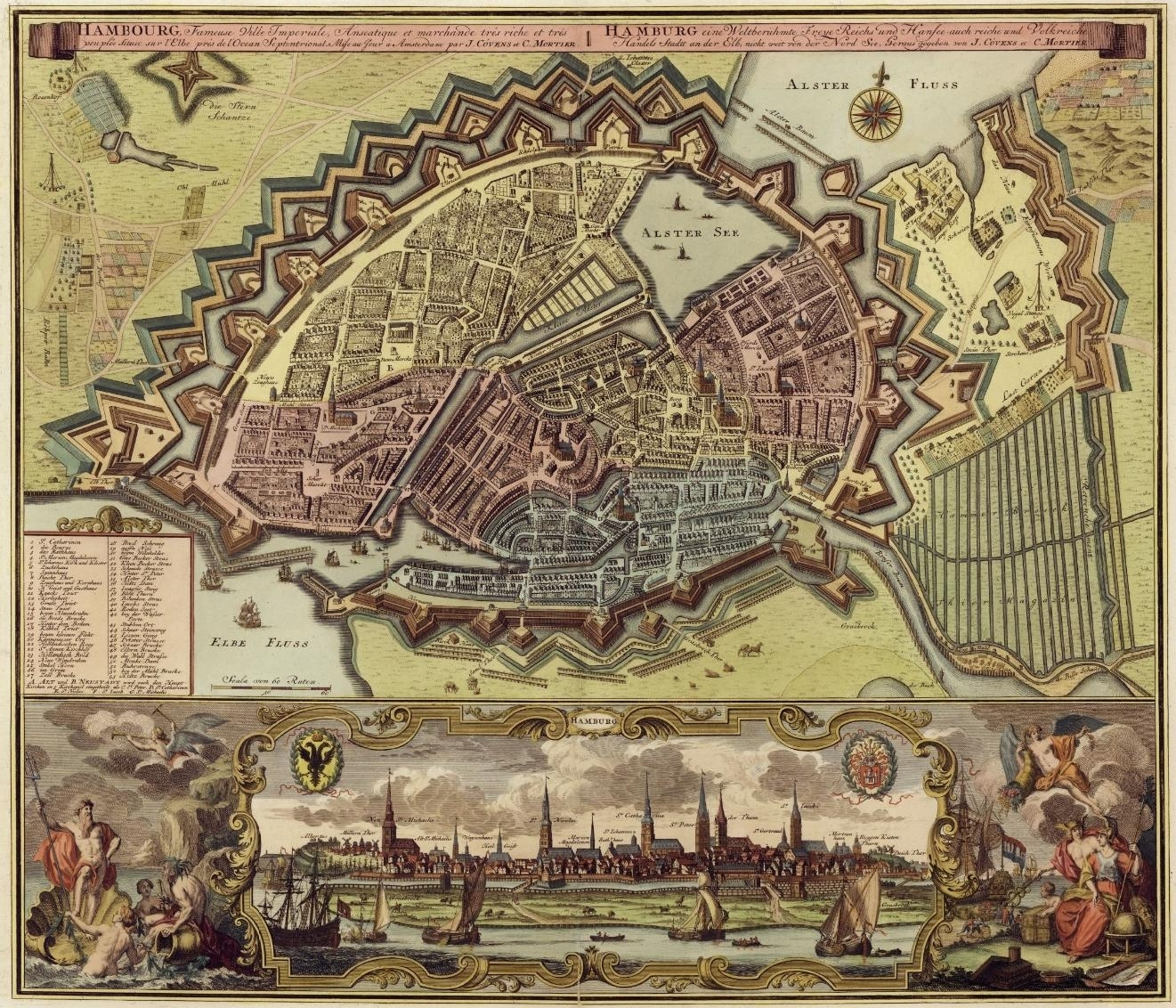
Hamburg, 1730

- 1510 – Hamburg becomes an imperial city of the Holy Roman Empire.
- 1529
  - Protestant Reformation.
  - Council of citizens established.
  - Johanneum (college) founded.
- 1536 – Hamburg joins Schmalkaldic League.
- 1558 – Hamburg Stock Exchange established.
- 1567 – Trade with the Company of Merchant Adventurers of London established.
- 1590 – Berenberg Bank founded.
- 1615 – City walls extended around Hamburg-Neustadt.
- 1619 – Bank of Hamburg founded.
- 1630 – Bremen–Lübeck–Hamburg defensive alliance formed.
- 1654 – Synagoge Neuer Steinweg in use.
- 1663 – Erbauliche Monaths Unterredungen magazine begins publication.
- 1665 – Hamburg Chamber of Commerce founded.
- 1669
  - St. Michael's Church built.
  - Wapen von Hamburg (1669) (ship) launched.
- 1678 – Oper am Gänsemarkt (opera house) opens; premiere of Theile's opera Adam und Eva.
- 1679 – Coffee house in business.
- 1705 – Premiere of Handel's opera Almira.
- 1710 – Hamburg City Archives established.
- 1712 – Plague.
- 1735 – Commerzbibliothek (business library) founded.
- 1762
  - City occupied by Danish forces.
  - St. Michael's Church built.
- 1765
  - Hamburgische Gesellschaft zur Beförderung der Künste und nützlichen Gewerbe (arts society) and Patriotic Club founded.
  - Komödienhaus (theatre) built.
- 1767 – Hamburgische Entreprise (theatre) established.
- 1778 – Hamburger Ersparungskasse (bank) established.
- 1787 – City directory published.
- 1789 – Clubbs der Freundschaft founded.
- 1790 – United States consulate established.
- 1792 – Hamburger Jakobinerklub formed.
- 1799 – H. J. Merck & Co. in business.

== 19th century ==
=== 1800s–1840s ===
- 1805 – Gesellschaft der Freunde des vaterländischen Schul- und Erziehungswesens (education society) founded.
- 1806 – 19 November: French occupation of city begins.
- 1810 – Hoffmann und Campe publisher in business.
- 1811
  - 9th French-Polish Uhlan Regiment founded in Hamburg.
  - City becomes capital of the French Bouches-de-l'Elbe department.
- 1813
  - Siege of Hamburg.
  - Hamburg Women's Association established.
- 1814 – Hamburg Citizen Militia and Hamburg Police formed.
- 1815 – 8 June: City becomes a member state of the German Confederation.
- 1821 – Lehmann's botanical garden established.
- 1823
  - Hospital built in St. George.
  - Altona Observatory founded by Heinrich Christian Schumacher.
- 1825 – February flood of 1825.
- 1827 – City Theatre opens.
- 1828 – Hamburg Philharmonic Society formed.
- 1833 – Rauhes Haus founded.
- 1834 – Johanneum building constructed.
- 1835 – Coat of arms of Hamburg redesigned.
- 1838 – English Church built.
- 1839 – Verein für Hamburgische Geschichte (local history society) founded.
- 1840
  - Gymnasium founded.
  - Population: 136,956.
- 1841 – Circus Gymnasticus opens.
- 1842
  - Exchange built.
  - 5–8 May: Great Fire of Hamburg.
- 1843
  - Thalía Theatre built.
  - Naturhistorisches Museum Hamburg established.
- 1845 – Sillem's Bazar shopping arcade built.
- 1846 – Berliner Railway Station established.
- 1847
  - Hamburg America Line in business.
  - Patriotic Club building constructed.
  - Pestalozzi-Stiftung Hamburg founded
- 1848 – Otto Meissner (publisher) in business.
- 1849
  - Hamburger Nachtrichten newspaper begins publication.
  - St. Peter's Church rebuilt again.

=== 1850s–1890s ===
- 1850 – Kunsthalle (art gallery) opens.
- 1855 – January: Flood.
- 1856 – North German Bank and Union Bank established.
- 1859
  - Synagoge Kohlhöfen built.
  - Hamburg Frauenchor (women's choir) founded.
- 1861
  - Museum Godeffroy opens.
  - Population: 178,841.
- 1863
  - Hamburger Fremdenblatt newspaper in publication.
  - Zoological Garden of Hamburg opens.
  - Rebuilt St. Nicholas' Church dedicated.
- 1865
  - Lübeck–Hamburg railway begins operating; Lübecker Railway Station established.
  - Lombardsbrücke (bridge) built.
- 1866
  - Horsecar tram begins operating.
  - Bahnhof Hamburg Klosterthor (railway station) established.
  - 21 August: City becomes part of the North German Confederation.
- 1867 – Trabrennbahn Bahrenfeld (horse racetrack) built.
- 1868 – St. Georg becomes part of city.
- 1869 – Horner Rennbahn (horse racetrack) and Kunsthalle built.
- 1871
  - City becomes part of the German Empire.
  - Population: 240,251.
  - Gesellschaft für Verbreitung von Volksbildung (education society) branch established.
- 1872 – Venloer Railway Station established.
- 1873
  - Photographic Society founded.
  - Frei Hafen bridge constructed.
- 1874 – Hagenbeck's zoo opens.
- 1877
  - Ohlsdorf Cemetery established near city.
  - Blohm + Voss shipbuilders in business near city.
- 1878 – Museum for Art and Industry founded.
- 1879
  - Hanseatic High Court of Appeal headquartered in Hamburg.
  - Holsten Brewery in business.
- 1880 – Steinway & Sons piano factory in operation.
- 1883 – Speicherstadt (warehouse district) construction begins in the Port of Hamburg.
- 1887
  - Hamburger Echo newspaper begins publication.
  - Sport-Club Germania Hamburg founded.
  - Central post office built.
- 1888
  - Hamburg joins German Customs Union.
  - Harbourworks and iron bridge constructed.
  - Free Port opens.
- 1889 – 15 May: Exhibition of Trade and Industry opens.
- 1890
  - German East Africa Line (shipping company) in business.
  - May: Gas-worker strike.
  - Population: 323,923.
- 1891 – Natural History Museum built.
- 1892
  - 1892 Germany cholera outbreak.
  - German Open Tennis Championships begin.
  - Hamburger Dom (funfair) relocated to Heiligengeistfeld fair ground.
- 1894 – St. Pauli becomes part of city.
- 1896
  - November: Dockworker strike.
  - Fischauktionshalle (Hamburg-Altona) (fish market) rebuilt.
- 1897 – Hamburg Rathaus (city hall) built.
- 1898 – Hamburg-Altona railway station opens.
- 1899 – Hamburger Öffentliche Bücherhallen (library) founded.
- 1900
  - Institute for Maritime and Tropical Diseases opens.
  - Shipbuilding school founded.

== 20th century ==
=== 1900–1945 ===
- 1901 – Civil law courts built.
- 1904 – American Businessmen's Club of Hamburg founded.
- 1905 – Population: 802,793.
- 1906
  - Hamburg Hauptbahnhof (railway station) opens.
  - Altona-Hamburg railway begins operating.
- 1907
  - Tierpark Hagenbeck (zoo) established.
  - Stadion Hoheluft (stadium) opens.
- 1908
  - Hamburg Colonial Institute established.
  - Music Hall inaugurated.
  - Simplo Fullfeder pen company relocates to Hamburg.
- 1909 – Hotel Atlantic in business.
- 1910 – Sportplatz at Rothenbaum opens.
- 1911 – Hamburg Airport and Elbe Tunnel open.
- 1912
  - Hamburg U-Bahn begins operating.
  - Hamburg-Bergedorf Observatory dedicated.
  - Hamburg-Mannheimer Insurance Corporation in business.
- 1913
  - 3 April: Vaterland passenger ship launched.
  - Gewerkschaftlich-Genossenschaftliche Versicherungsaktiengesellschaft (insurance firm) in business.
- 1914 – Hamburg Stadtpark (park) opens.
- 1918
  - Hamburg Kammerspiele (theatre) founded.
  - Hamburger Volkszeitung newspaper begins publication.
- 1919 – University of Hamburg and Hamburger Sport-Verein established.
- 1921 – Consulate of Poland founded.
- 1922 – Museum of Hamburg History opens.
- 1923 – Labour and Socialist International founded in Hamburg.
- 1924
  - Nordische Rundfunk radio begins broadcasting.
  - Chilehaus built.
- 1925
  - Helms-Museum and Hamburg School of Astrology established.
  - Population: 1,079,126.
- 1926 – Botanischer Sondergarten Wandsbek (garden) established.
- 1930
  - Planten un Blomen (park) created.
  - Population: 1,145,124.
- 1933
  - Nazis seize control of the city and Carl Vincent Krogmann becomes mayor.
  - Hamburger Flugzeugbau (aircraft company) in business.
  - Fuhlsbüttel concentration camp founded.
- 1934
  - Bürgerschaft abolished.
  - Gau Hamburg established.
  - Transmitter Hamburg-Billstedt begins operating.
- 1937
  - major expansion of the land of Hamburg per the Greater Hamburg Act:
    - the cities Altona, Wandsbek, and Harburg-Wilhelmsburg join
    - and the cities Geesthacht and Cuxhaven (including Neuwerk) leave the territory of the Land Hamburg.
- 1938 – Neuengamme concentration camp established by SS.
- 1939 – Bombing of Hamburg in World War II begins.
- October 1940 – The Kinderlandverschickung begins evacuating Hamburg schoolchildren, often together with their teachers, to areas considered safer from air raids. About 150,000 Hamburg children take part in the programme between 1940 and 1945.
- 1940 – April: Oflag X-D prisoner-of-war camp for Allied officers established.
- 1943
  - May: Langer Morgen forced labour camp for men established.
  - 7 August: Main base of the 2nd SS construction brigade (forced labour camp) relocated from Bremen to Hamburg.
- 1944
  - April: 2nd SS construction brigade relocated to Berlin.
  - 8 June: Hamburg-Wandsbek subcamp of the Ravensbrück concentration camp established. The prisoners were mostly Polish and Soviet women.
  - July: Hamburg-Veddel subcamp of the Neuengamme concentration camp established. The prisoners were Jewish women.
  - 1 September: Hamburg-Wandsbek subcamp of Ravensbrück reorganized into a subcamp of the Neuengamme concentration camp.
  - 12 September: Hamburg-Langenhorn subcamp of the Neuengamme concentration camp established. The prisoners were Jewish women.
  - 13 September: Hamburg-Neugraben and Hamburg-Sasel subcamps of the Neuengamme concentration camp established. The prisoners were Jewish women.
  - 13 September: Women prisoners of the Hamburg-Veddel subcamp moved to other subcamps in Hamburg and Wedel.
  - 15 September: 2,000 male prisoners deported to the Hamburg-Veddel subcamp of Neuengamme.
  - 27 September: Hamburg-Eidelstedt subcamp of the Neuengamme concentration camp established. The prisoners were Jewish women.
  - October: Hamburg-Finkenwerder subcamp of the Neuengamme concentration camp established. The prisoners were mostly Soviet, Polish, Belgian, French and Danish men.
  - November: Subcamp of the Neuengamme concentration camp established by the SS at the Spaldingstraße for men of various nationalities.
  - L'Obstinée masonic lodge established by Belgian POWs in the Oflag X-D POW camp.
- 1945
  - 8 February: Hamburg-Neugraben subcamp of Neuengamme dissolved and Hamburg-Tiefstack subcamp founded. Surviving prisoners moved from the Hamburg-Neugraben to the Hamburg-Tiefstack subcamp.
  - March: 250 Romani and Sinti women deported to the Hamburg-Langenhorn subcamp of Neuengamme from the Ravensbrück concentration camp.
  - March: Hamburg-Finkenwerder subcamp of Neuengamme dissolved.
  - 22 March: Langer Morgen forced labour camp dissolved.
  - 7 April: Hamburg-Tiefstack subcamp of Neuengamme dissolved, surviving prisoners deported to Bergen-Belsen.
  - 14 April: Hamburg-Veddel subcamp of Neuengamme dissolved, surviving prisoners deported to Sandbostel.
  - 17 April: Subcamp of Neuengamme at Spaldingstraße dissolved, surviving prisoners deported to Sandbostel.
  - 30 April: Hamburg-Wandsbek subcamp of Neuengamme dissolved.
  - 3 May: Hamburg-Langenhorn subcamp of Neuengamme dissolved, surviving prisoners deported to the Hamburg-Eidelstedt subcamp.
  - 3 May: Oflag X-D POW camp liberated by the British.
  - 4–5 May: Hamburg-Sasel subcamp of Neuengamme liberated by the British.
  - 5 May: Hamburg-Eidelstedt subcamp of Neuengamme liberated by the British.
  - Bombing of Hamburg in World War II ends.
  - Hamburg in the British occupation zone.
  - Rudolf Petersen appointed mayor by British authorities.
  - Eppendorf (company) founded.
  - Population: 1,350,278.

=== 1946–1990s ===
- 1946
  - 5 December: Hamburg Ravensbrück trials for war crimes begin at the Curiohaus.
  - Max Brauer becomes mayor.
- 1948
  - Hamburger Abendblatt newspaper and Stern news magazine begin publication.
  - Population: 1,518,900.
- 1949 – Hamburger Morgenpost newspaper begins publication.
- 1950 – Public University of Music established.
- 1951 – Institut français Hamburg founded.
- 1952
  - Der Spiegel news magazine headquartered in city.
  - Bild newspaper begins publication.
  - Constitution of Hamburg ratified.
  - UNESCO Institute for Lifelong Learning headquartered in city.
- 1953
  - Volksparkstadion (stadium) opens.
  - International garden show held.
- 1955 – Hamburg State Opera building opens.
- 1957
  - Fazle Omar Mosque built.
  - Streit's Haus Filmtheater opens.
  - British Army School and Hamburg Symphony Orchestra established.
- 1958 – Hamburg Atlantic Line in business.
- 1959 – Kaiserkeller night club opens.
- 1960 – August: English rock band The Beatles begin performing in Hamburg.
- 1961 – Population: 1,840,543.
- 1962
  - Spiegel scandal.
  - North Sea flood of 1962.
- 1963
  - Millerntor-Stadion (stadium) opens.
  - St. James' Church restored.
  - Alter Botanischer Garten Hamburg greenhouses built.
- 1964 - Deutsches Übersee-Institut headquartered in Hamburg.
- 1965
  - Gruner + Jahr publisher in business.
  - Hamburg Transport Association established.
  - Imam Ali Mosque built.
  - NDR Fernsehen (television) headquartered in city.
- 1967 – Eros Center brothel in business on the Reeperbahn.
- 1968
  - Cherry Blossom Festival begins.
  - Alsterdorfer Sporthalle and Gruenspan music club open.
- 1969 – waived older rights on harbour estate in Cuxhaven in favour of Neuwerk and Scharhörn to build an offshore harbour.
- 1970
  - Hamburg University of Applied Sciences founded.
  - Population: 1,793,640.
- 1971 – Institute for Peace Research and Security Policy and Fabrik cultural centre founded.
- 1973
  - Congress Center Hamburg opens.
  - University of the German Federal Armed Forces and Neumeier's Hamburg Ballet established.
  - Kattwykbrücke (bridge) built.
- 1974
  - Köhlbrand Bridge built.
  - Hans-Ulrich Klose becomes mayor.
- 1975 – New Elbe Tunnel opens.
- 1976 – Die Motte youth centre founded in Ottensen.
- 1978
  - July: City hosts the 1978 World Fencing Championships.
  - Technical University of Hamburg founded.
- 1979
  - Botanischer Garten Hamburg (garden) opens.
  - Werkstatt 3 co-operative founded in Ottensen.
- 1980 – Stadtteilarchiv Ottensen (archive) founded.
- 1981
  - Protest against proposed Brokdorf Nuclear Power Plant.
  - Klaus von Dohnányi becomes mayor.
  - Squat on Hafenstraße begins.
- 1982 – Kampnagel (cultural space) established.
- 1984
  - Chaos Communication Congress begins.
  - Hamburg Institute for Social Research founded.
- 1985
  - Birdland jazz club opens.
  - Museum der Arbeit established.
- 1986
  - Chaos Computer Club headquartered in city.
  - Radio Hamburg begins broadcasting.
  - Hamburg Marathon begins.
  - Brokdorf Nuclear Power Plant commissioned near city.
- 1988
  - Center for Science and International Security at the University of Hamburg founded.
  - Henning Voscherau becomes mayor.
  - Population: 1,603,070.
- 1989
  - Deichtorhallen art centre opens.
  - Hamburg Center for Film Research founded.
- 1990 – GoodMills Deutschland headquartered in city.
- 1992 – Filmfest Hamburg begins.
- 1994 – Film and Television Museum Hamburg and Roman Catholic Archdiocese of Hamburg established.
- 1996 – City website online (approximate date).
- 1997 – Ortwin Runde becomes mayor.
- 1998
  - Afghan Museum established.
  - Am Rothenbaum (sport venue) built.
- 2000
  - Bucerius Law School established.
  - International Tribunal for the Law of the Sea headquartered in city.

== 21st century ==
- 2001
  - Long Night of Museums begins.
  - Container Terminal Altenwerder opens.
  - Ole von Beust becomes mayor.
- 2002
  - 4 November: Bambule eviction.
  - O2 World arena opens.
  - Bucerius Kunst Forum (art gallery) founded.
- 2003 – Hamburg Pride founded.
- 2004
  - Hamburg Summit: China meets Europe begins.
  - Major Records in business.
- 2005 – eVendi Arena (for American football) built.
- 2006 – German Institute of Global and Area Studies established.
- 2007
  - World Future Council and Hamburg Schleswig-Holstein Film Promotion headquartered in city.
  - 29 May: Anti-globalization protest.
  - Dockville music festival.
  - Elbphilharmonie construction begins.
- 2008
  - HafenCity district and Foundation for Historic Museums of Hamburg established.
  - Lange Nacht der Industrie (industrial public relations event) begins.
  - Museum für Kunst und Kultur an der Elbe opens in Jenisch House.
- 2009
  - International Chamber Music Competition Hamburg begins.
  - Student protest for education reform.
- 2010 – Christoph Ahlhaus becomes mayor.
- 2011
  - Olaf Scholz (SPD) becomes mayor.
  - European Union, Latin America and the Caribbean Foundation headquartered in city.
- 2012 – Population: 1,813,587.
- 2013 – December: 2013–14 Hamburg demonstrations begin.
- 2015 – 2015 Hamburg Olympics referendum.
- 2016 – 31 October: Elbphilharmonie concert hall is officially completed.
- 2017
  - 7 July: G20 summit meeting held.
  - December: City hosts the 2017 World Women's Handball Championship.
- 2018 - Peter Tschentscher (SPD) becomes mayor.
- 2023 – Shooting.

== See also ==
- History of Hamburg
- List of mayors of Hamburg
- List of museums and cultural institutions in Hamburg

== Bibliography ==
=== in English ===
published in 17th–18th centuries

- Thomas Nugent (1749), "Hamburg", The Grand Tour, vol. 2: Germany and Holland, London: S. Birt, hdl:2027/mdp.39015030762572
- Joseph Marshall (1772), "Hamburgh (etc.)", Travels through Holland, Flanders, Germany, Denmark, Sweden, Lapland, Russia, the Ukraine, and Poland, in the years 1768, 1769, and 1770, London: Printed for J. Almon, OCLC 3354484
- Richard Brookes (1786), "Hamburg", The General Gazetteer (6th ed.), London: J.F.C. Rivington

published in 19th century

- Jedidiah Morse; Richard C. Morse (1823), "Hamburgh", New Universal Gazetteer (4th ed.), New Haven: S. Converse
- David Brewster, ed. (1830). "Hamburgh". Edinburgh Encyclopædia. Edinburgh: William Blackwood.
- Edward Augustus Domeier (1830), "Hamburg", Descriptive Road-Book of Germany, London: Samuel Leigh, hdl:2027/hvd.hx167e
- Robert Baird (1842), "Hamburg", Visit to Northern Europe, New York: John S. Taylor & Co., OCLC 8052123
- Theodore Alois Buckley (1862), "Hamburgh", Great Cities of the Middle Ages (2nd ed.), London: Routledge, Warne, & Routledge
- Charles Knight, ed. (1866). "Hamburg". Geography. English Cyclopaedia. Vol. 3. London: Bradbury, Evans, & Co. hdl:2027/nyp.33433000064802.
- "Hamburg", Northern Germany (5th ed.), Coblenz: Karl Baedeker, 1873, OCLC 5947482
- "Hamburg", Bradshaw's Illustrated Hand-book to Germany, London: W.J. Adams & Sons, 1873
- "Hamburg", Appletons' European Guide Book, New York: D. Appleton & Co., 1888
- Murat Halstead (November 1892). "City of Hamburg". The Cosmopolitan. New York.

published in 20th century

- "Hamburg", Northern Germany (15th ed.), Leipzig: Karl Baedeker, 1910, OCLC 78390379
- Chisholm, Hugh, ed. (1911). "Hamburg (city)" . Encyclopædia Britannica. Vol. 12 (11th ed.). Cambridge University Press. pp. 871–875. "a seaport of Germany"
- Chisholm, Hugh, ed. (1911). "Hamburg (state)" . Encyclopædia Britannica. Vol. 12 (11th ed.). Cambridge University Press. p. 871. "a state of the German empire"
- Nathaniel Newnham Davis (1911), "Hamburg", The Gourmet's Guide to Europe (3rd ed.), London: Grant Richards
- Esther Singleton (1913), "City of Hamburg", Great Cities of Europe, Garden City, N.Y.: Doubleday, Page
- Wilson King (1914), Chronicles of Three Free Cities: Hamburg Bremen, Lübeck, London: Dent, OL 6568866M
- Joachim Joesten (1960), This is Hamburg in 1960, New Germany Reports, Gt. Barrington, Massachusetts, US: J. Joesten
- Philippe Dollinger (1970). The German Hansa. Stanford University Press. ISBN 978-0-8047-0742-8.
- Madeleine Hurd (1996). "Education, Morality, and the Politics of Class in Hamburg and Stockholm, 1870–1914". Journal of Contemporary History. 31 (4): 619–650. doi:10.1177/002200949603100402. JSTOR 261041. S2CID 144894036.

published in 21st century

- John M. Jeep, ed. (2001). "Hamburg". Medieval Germany: an Encyclopedia. Garland Publishing. ISBN 0-8240-7644-3.
- Clemens Wischermann (2002). "Changes in population development, urban structures, and living conditions in nineteenth-century Hamburg". In Richard Lawton; W. Robert Lee (eds.). Population and Society in Western European Port Cities, c.1650-1939. Liverpool University Press. ISBN 978-0-85323-435-7.
- Peter Uwe Hohendahl, ed. (2003), Patriotism, Cosmopolitanism, and National Culture: Public Culture in Hamburg, 1700–1933, Rodopi, ISBN 9789042011854
- Maiken Umbach (2005). "A Tale of Second Cities: Autonomy, Culture, and the Law in Hamburg and Barcelona in the Late Nineteenth Century". American Historical Review. 110 (3): 659–692. doi:10.1086/ahr.110.3.659.

=== in German ===
- Zeiller, Martin (1653). "Hamburg". Topographia Saxoniae Inferioris. Topographia Germaniae (in German). Frankfurt. p. 125+.
- Gottfried Schütze (1776). Die Geschichte von Hamburg (in German). Hamburg: J.G. Fritsch. v.2
- J. J. Ropelius (1832). Chronik oder Geschichte von Hamburg [Chronicle or History of Hamburg] (in German). J.L.H. Wichers und Sohn.
- W. L. Meeder (1838–1839). Geschichte von Hamburg [History of Hamburg] (in German). Hamburg.
- Johann Gustav Gallois (1853–1856), Geschichte der Stadt Hamburg (in German), Hamburg: Tramburg's Erben, OCLC 6894187
- Architectonischen Verein (1868). Hamburg: historisch-topographische und baugeschichtliche Mittheilungen (in German). Hamburg: Otto Meissner.
- Gaedechens (1880). Historische Topographie der Freien und Hanse-Stadt Hamburg (in German).
- Carl Mönckeberg (1885), Geschichte der Freien und Hansestadt Hamburg (in German), Persiehl, OCLC 13436239, OL 23438002M
- Fabian Landau (1907). Denksteine aus der Geschichte von Hamburg und Altona [Monuments from the history of Hamburg and Altona] (in German). Hamburg: Knackstedt & Näther.
- Hamburg. Griebens Reiseführer (in German). A. Goldschmidt. 1912.
- P. Krauss und E. Uetrecht, ed. (1913). "Hamburg". Meyers Deutscher Städteatlas [Meyer's Atlas of German Cities] (in German). Leipzig: Bibliographisches Institut.
