= Carl Heinz Illies =

German merchant (1935–1995)

Carl Heinz Illies (1 April 1935 – 16 January 1995) was an Hamburger merchant (C. Illies & Co.) and, from 1981 to 1986, President of the Hamburg Chamber of Commerce.

== Origin, education and profession ==
Born in Tokyo, Illies was heir of a Hamburg merchant family as the son of Carl Jürgen Illies. His great-grandfather Carl Illies senior (1840-1910) had taken over the oldest German-Japanese trading house Louis Kniffler & Co. in 1880 founded in Nagasaki in 1859 and renamed it Carl Illies & Co.

In Hamburg, Illies attended the Gelehrtenschule des Johanneums, completed an apprenticeship at the Berenberg Bank after his Abitur and then studied economics in the USA. After a traineeship with an American shipping company, he joined his father's company in 1958 and took over the management in 1966. Illies expanded the activities of the trading house to selected cities in Africa and the China network with eight additional office locations. Illies died at only 59 years of age and left the company to his son Carl Michael Illies, who is now the 5th generation to run the trading house.

== Honorary office ==
From 1981 to 1986, he was President of the Hamburg Chamber of Commerce and from 1986 Vice-President of the Association of German Chambers of Industry and Commerce. He was Vice-President of the Ostasiatischer Verein, which his great-grandfather had co-founded in 1900, and for many years Chairman of the country committees Japan, Korea and Taiwan of the central associations of the German economy BDI and DIHK.

From 1988 to 1991, he was President of the Übersee-Club.

The Carl-Heinz Illies scholarship at the Deutsche Stiftung Musikleben is named after him.

He also distinguished himself through numerous publications.
