= Illies =

Illies can refer to:

- C. Illies & Co., German company
- Illies, Nord, a commune in the Nord department in northern France
- Henning Illies, a German geologist
