= Hamburg Chamber of Commerce =

Organization

- Handelskammer Hamburg
- Formation: 19 January 1665; 361 years ago
- Type: chamber of commerce
- Legal status: K. d. ö. R.
- Location(s): Adolphsplatz 1; 20457 Hamburg, Germany
- Coordinates: 53°32′59″N 9°59′27″E
- Region served: Hamburg
- Members: 150,000 (2015)
- Official language: German
- President: Norbert Aust
- Subsidiaries: Commerzbibliothek; Hamburg School of Business Administration (HSBA)
- Staff: 288
- Website: Official website

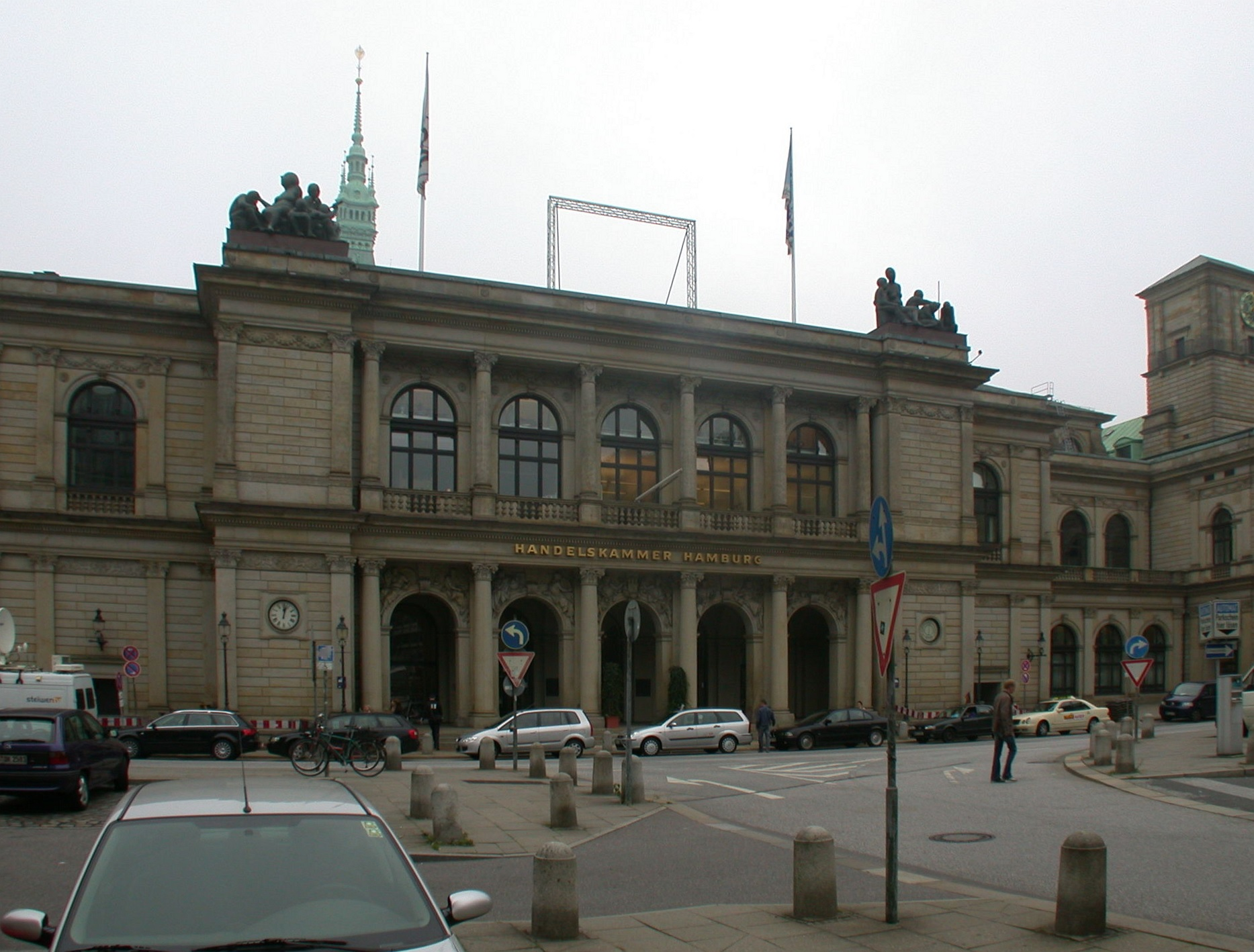
The chamber's main building (2006)

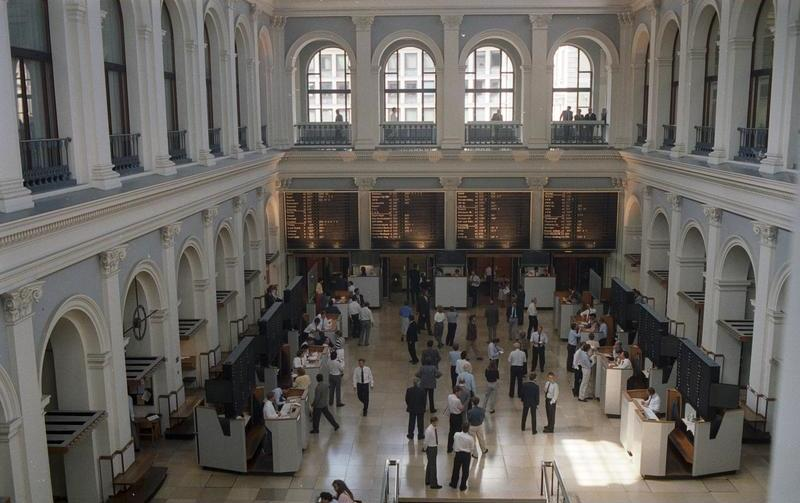
Floor of the Hamburg Stock Exchange (Börse), inside the Chamber of Commerce.

The Hamburg Chamber of Commerce (Handelskammer Hamburg), originally named the Commercial Deputation (Commerz-Deputation), is the chamber of commerce for the city state of Hamburg, and was founded in 1665. Hamburg has for centuries been a commercial centre of Northern Europe, and the Hamburg Chamber of Commerce currently has 160,000 companies as its members. It was traditionally one of the three main political bodies of Hamburg.

== Role ==
The chamber has several official responsibilities. The Hamburg Stock Exchange (founded in 1558) is owned by and subordinate to the Hamburg Chamber of Commerce. The chamber has its offices in the old stock exchange building.

The Commercial Deputation, founded in 1665, originally consisted of seven members, elected among the city's "honourable merchants." Each member became President of the Commercial Deputation during his last year in office. The Commercial Deputation was officially recognised by the Hamburg council (senate) in 1674 as the representation of the city's merchants. From 1710, all the seven members of the Commercial Deputation were also ex officio members of the Erbgesessene Bürgerschaft (the Hamburg Parliament). The Commercial Deputation was, along with council/senate and Bürgerschaft, one of the most important political bodies of Hamburg.

In 1735, the Commerzbibliothek (Library of Commerce) was founded, and is the oldest library of its kind. In 1867, the Commercial Deputation was transformed into the Hamburg Chamber of Commerce.

Since 2004 the Chamber of Commerce organizes the bi-annual Hamburg Summit: China meets Europe.

== Presidents of the Hamburg Commercial Deputation and Chamber of Commerce since 1665 ==
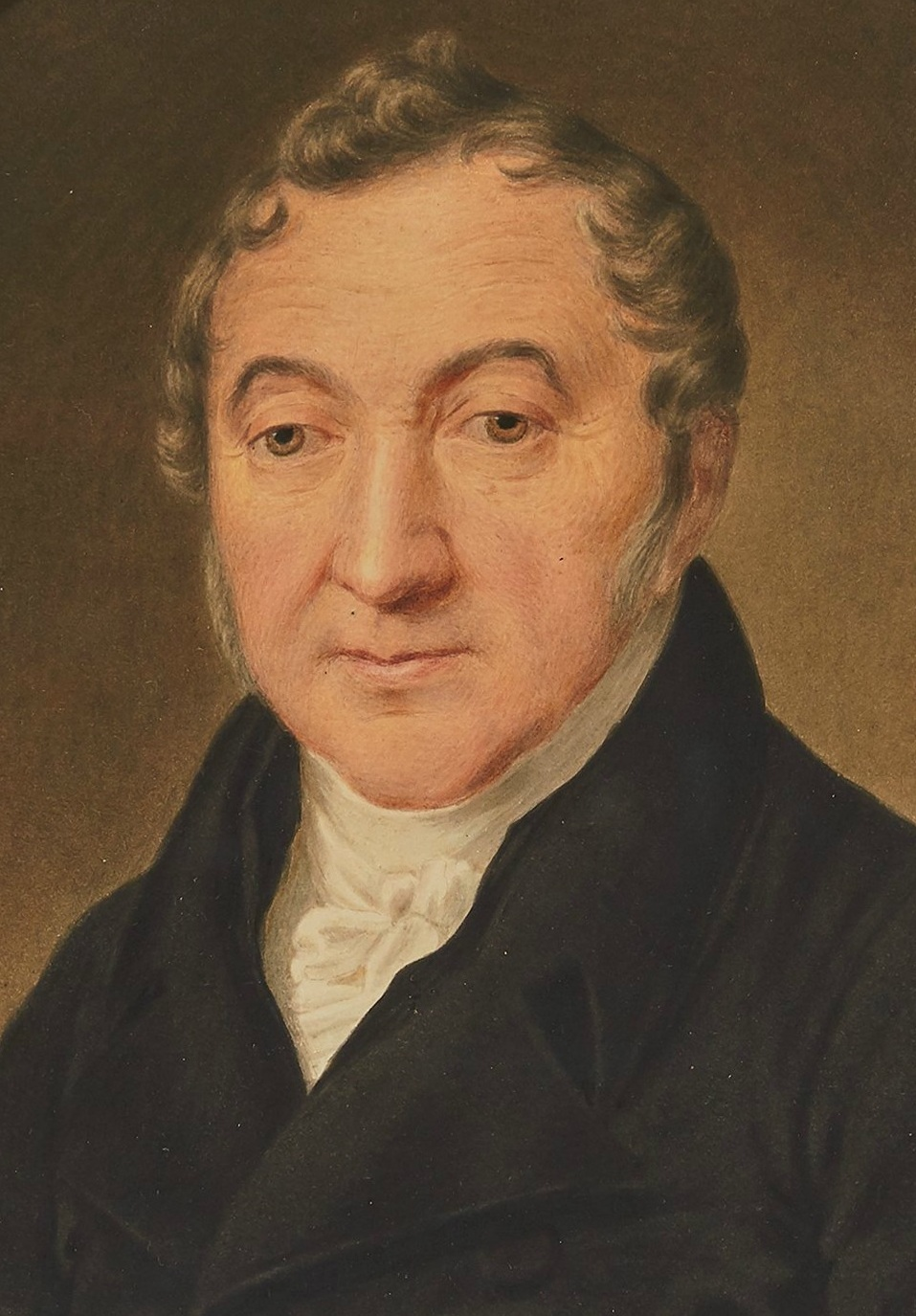
Ludwig Erdwin Seyler, an influential politician in Hamburg during the Napoleonic Wars who served as a member of the Commercial Deputation from 1813 and as its President 1817–1818

- Michael Heusch (January 1665-February 1667)
- Daniel Le Conte (February 1667–March 1668)
- Hinrich Busch (March 1668–February 1669)
- Johan Gull (Guhl, Guhle) (February 1669–November 1671)
- Frans von Bremen (November 1671–April 1674)
- Frans Schloyer (April 1674–August 1675)
- Barthold Jencquel (August 1675–September 1676)
- Johan Jacob von Huebner (September 1676–February 1678)
- Frans de la Camp (February 1678–March 1678)
- Hinrich Witte (March 1678–April 1679)
- Simon Fock (April 1679–March 1681)
- Johan Cordes (March 1681–December 1683)
- Jochim Jarchau (January 1684–April 1686)
- Hinrich de Dobbeler (September 1686–May 1687)
- Peter Burmester (May 1687–May 1689)
- Hinrich Kronenburg (May 1689–May 1690 )
- Herman Harbart (May 1690–May 1691)
- Herman Krochman (May 1691–May 1692)
- Adrian Boon (May 1692–May 1693)
- Paul (Rudolfs) Amsinck (May 1693–May 1694)
- Walter Beckhoff (May 1694–July 1695)
- Hinrich von Som (Sum) (July 1695–May 1696 )
- Jacob Brommer (May 1696–September 1696)
- Johan Schulte (October 1696–May 1697)
- Thomas Dreyer (May 1697–May 1699)
- Hermann Luis (May 1699–September 1700)
- Hans Hinrich von Dort (September 1700–March 1702)
- Jacob Greve (March 1702–August 1703)
- Johan Wischoff (August 1703–June 1704)
- Michael Wilckens (June 1704–June 1705)
- Joris Tamm (June 1705–June 1706)
- David Geismer (June 1706–June 1707)
- Hinrich Peter Kentzler (June 1707–June 1708)
- Adam Hübener (June 1708–June 1709)
- Joachim Boetefeur (June 1709–July 1710)
- Jürgen Greve (July 1710–October 1711)
- Matthias Schmid (October 1711–July 1712)
- Gerd Sops (July 1712–March 1713)
- Jacob Vockmann (March 1713–April 1714)
- Joh. Adrian Boon (April 1714–March 1715)
- Georg Jencquel (March 1715–May 1716)
- Frans Mente (May 1716–June 1717)
- Gerd Burmester (June 1717–June 1718)
- Johan Caspar Weber (June 1718–June 1719)
- Lorenz Thiele (June 1719–June 1720)
- Hinrich Thorlade (June 1720–June 1721)
- Jacob Martens (June 1721–August 1722)
- Johann Berenberg (August 1722–September 1723)
- David Doormann (September 1723–October 1724)
- Philipp Boon (October 1724–December 1725)
- Hinrich Jencquel (December 1725–September 1726)
- Albert Schulte (September 1726–June 1727)
- Andreas Beckhoff (June 1727–September 1728)
- Rudolf Bereberg (October 1728–December 1729)
- Raetje Richters (December 1729–December 1730)
- Otto Hinrich (December 1730–January 1732)
- Nicolaus Jante (January 1732–March 1733)
- Johann Glöde (March 1733–April 1734)
- Rodrigo Voss (April 1734–March 1735)
- Peter Voigt (March 1735–February 1736)
- Johan Ludewig Hübener (February 1736–June 1737)
- Johan Diederich Beckhoff (June 1737–May 1738)
- Peter Greve (May 1738–September 1738)
- Johan Diederich Cordes (September 1738–August 1739)
- Bartold Schlebusch (August 1739–July 1740)
- Christian Hollmer (July 1740–August 1741)
- Hieronymus Burmester (August 1741–April 1742)
- Paul Paulsen (April 1742–April 1743)
- Rudolph Kentzler (April 1743–May 1744)
- Johann Arnold Ellermann (May 1744–May 1745)
- Rudolph Michael Ridel (May 1745–March 1746)
- Samuel Diederich Mutzenbecher (March 1746–April 1747)
- Cornelius Jacob Berenberg (April 1747–August 1748)
- David Friedrich Klug (August 1748–July 1749)
- Simon Tamm (July 1749–May 1750)
- Johann Hinrich Martens (May 1750–September 1751)
- Paridom Colldorf (September 1751–June 1752)
- Johann Georg Poppe (June 1752–November 1753)
- Johann Paul Dimpfel (November 1753–December 1754)
- Heinrich Hancker (December 1754–November 1755)
- Caspar Voght (November 1755–November 1756)
- Hieronymus Matthiessen (November 1756–October 1757)
- Jacob Jencquel (October 1757–April 1758)
- Frantz Nicolaus Lütjens (April 1758–May 1759)
- Jürgen Schultz (May 1759–May 1760)
- Paul Berenberg (May 1760–June 1761)
- Gotthelf Bagge (June 1761–January 1763)
- Johann Hinrich Dimpfel (January 1763–January 1764)
- Hinrich Christoph Lienau (January 1764–February 1765)
- Andreas Schütt (February 1765–February 1766)
- Frans Poppe (February 1766–February 1767)
- Johann Gottlieb Gerhard (February 1767–March 1768)
- Johann Conrad Klinck (April 1768–March 1769)
- Johann Friederich Tonnies (March 1769–April 1770)
- Johannes Schuback (May 1770–May 1771)
- Nicolaus Anton Johann Kirchhoff (May 1771–July 1772)
- Paridom Daniel Kern (July 1772–July 1773)
- Georg Heinrich Eimbcke (July 1773–June 1774)
- Johann Jacob Böhl (July 1774–March 1775)
- Hinrich Petersen (March 1775–March 1776)
- Johann Siegmund Westphalen (March 1776–March 1777)
- Jürgen von Spreckelsen (March 1777–April 1778)
- Friedrich Justus (April 1778–March 1779)
- Johann Ludewig Wibel (March 1779–April 1780)
- Johann Bernhard Paschen (May 1780–September 1781)
- Johann Gerhard Greve (September 1781–September 1782)
- Franz Lorenz Gries (September 1782–August 1783)
- Martin Hieronymus Ohmann (August 1783–August 1784)
- Johann Daniel Klefeker (August 1784–July 1785)
- Christian Matthias Schröder (July 1785–July 1786)
- Frans Klefeker (July 1786–August 1787)
- Johann Gabe (August 1787–February 1789)
- Johann Ludewig Barthold Heise (February 1789–March 1790)
- Hinrich Claus Sonntag (April 1790–February 1791)
- Georg Heinrich Sieveking (February 1791–March 1792)
- Johann Daniel Koch (March 1792–April 1793)
- Johann Diederich Luis (April 1793–March 1794)
- Johann Valentin Meyer (March 1794–July 1795)
- Heinrich Wilhelm Christian Eimbcke (July 1795–May 1796)
- Johann Hinrich Rücker (May 1796–March 1797)
- David Hinrich Rowohl (March 1797–April 1798)
- Martin Johann Jenisch (April 1798–April 1798)
- Luer Anthon Prösch (April 1798–March 1799)
- Johann Friederich Mohn (April 1799–April 1800)
- Johann Ernst Friedrich Westphalen (April 1800–July 1801)
- Carl Wilhelm Pistorius (July 1801–May 1802)
- Jacob Hinrich Jencquel (June 1802–June 1803)
- Georg Wortmann (July 1803–March 1805)
- Nicolaus Bernhard Eybe (April 1805–March 1806)
- Hans Peter Moenck (April 1806–May 1807)
- Johann Conrad Sievert (June 1807–April 1808)
- Carsten Wilhelm Soltau (May 1808–April 1809)
- Lüer Nicolaus Lütkens (May 1809–May 1810)
- Hieronymus Sillem (May 1810–June 1811)
- Johann Georg Hasche (June 1811–April 1812)
- Martin Garlieb Sillem (March 1813–August 1814)
- Frans Detlof Bieber (September 1814–April 1816)
- Jacob Albers (April 1816–April 1817)
- Ludwig Erdwin Seyler (May 1817–July 1818)
- Richard Parish (September 1818–June 1819)
- Henrich Droop (July 1819–June 1820)
- Peter Keetman (n) (July 1820–September 1821)
- Siegfried Reinhard Baumeister (September 1821–May 1822)
- Martin Joseph Haller (May 1822–May 1823)
- Anton Diederich Schröder (June 1823–May 1824)
- Christian Jacob Johns (June 1824–May 1825)
- Johan Andreas Prell (June 1825–May 1826)
- Franz Matthias Mutzenbecher (June 1826–May 1827)
- Johann Diederich Stoppel (June 1827–May 1828)
- Nicolaus Bernhard Eybe (June 1828–May 1829)
- Johann Christian Hinsch (June 1829–May 1830)
- Jacob Heinrich de Chapeaurouge (June 1830–June 1831)
- Peter Godeffroy (June 1831–June 1832)
- Georg Heinrich Kaemmerer (June 1832–June 1833)
- Ascan Wilhelm Lutteroth-Legat (June 1833–June 1834)
- Johann Siemsen (June 1834–May 1835)
- Gottfried Geffcken (May 1835–June 1836)
- Carl Wilhelm Schröder (June 1836–June 1837)
- Johann Georg Maack (May 1837–May 1838)
- Ernst Heinrich Jacob Michahelles (May 1838–May 1839)
- Johann Heinrich Carl Höber (June 1839–June 1840)
- Georg Friedrich Vorwerk (June 1840–June 1841)
- Georg Hinrich Büsch (June 1840 –December 1841)
- Octavio Rudolph Schröder (January 1842–December 1842)
- Adolph Eduard Vidal (January 1843–December 1843)
- Heinrich Geffcken (January 1844–December 1844)
- Johan Cesar Godeffroy (January 1845–December 1845)
- Theodor Dill (January 1846–December 1846)
- Justus Carl Wilhelm Ruperti (January 1847–December 1847)
- Adolph Jacob Hertz (January 1848–December 1848)
- Wilhelm Theodor Schiller (January 1849–December 1849)
- Anton Daniel Pehmöller (1850–1851)
- Robert Flor (1851)
- August Joseph Schön (1852)
- Wilhelm Gossler (1853)
- Johann Friedrich Carl Refardt, sen. (1854)
- Carl Ludwig Meister (1855)
- Robert Kayser (1856)
- Peter Franz Biancone (1857)
- Adolph Godeffroy (1858)
- August Sanders (1859)
- Claes Christian Crasemann (1860)
- Ferdinand Jacobson (1861)
- Edgar Daniel Roß (1862)
- Johann Georg Trautmann (1863)
- Heinrich Amsinck (1864)
- Peter Anton Rodatz (1865)
- Adolph Ferdinand Hertz (1866)
- Johann Conrad Warnecke (1867)
- Gustav Adolf Schön (1868–1869)
- Carl Johannes Koyemann (1870–1871)
- Johann Friedrich Thomas Stahmer (1872)
- Marcus Wolf Hinrichsen (1873)
- Carl Wilhelm Ludwig Jacob (1874)
- Alexander August Borgnis (1875)
- Heinrich August Müller (1876)
- Johan Cesar Godeffroy (1877)
- Daniel Roß (1878)
- Ernst Gossler (1879)
- Arthur Lutteroth (1879 –1882)
- Johann Friedrich Carl Refardt, Juni (1883 –1884)
- Adolph Woermann (1884 –1885)
- Robert Eduard Julius Mestern (1885–1888)
- Siegmund Hinrichsen (1889–1891)
- Gustav August Rudolph Crasemann (1891–1895)
- Carl Ferdinand Laeisz (1895–1898)
- Adolph Woermann (1899–1903)
- Heinrich Alfred Michahelles (1903–1907)
- Max von Schinckel (1907–1910)
- Heinrich Edmund Bohlen (1911–1914)
- Gustav August Rudolph Crasemann (1915–1917)
- Friedrich Carl Hermann Heye (1917–1918)
- Franz Heinrich Witthoefft (1919–1923)
- Hermann Rudolf Münchmeyer (1923 –1927)
- Anton Cornelius Hübbe (1927–1931)
- Carl Ludwig Nottebohm (1931–1933)
- Hermann Victor Hugo Hübbe (1933–1937)
- Otto Joachim de la Camp (1937–1945)
- Max Mörck (1945)
- Johann Jacob Paul Wirtz (1945–1946)
- Albert Schäfer (1946–1956)
- Alwin Münchmeyer der Jüngere (1956–1959)
- Hans Rudolph von Schröder (1960–1963)
- Rolf Stödter (1964–1968)
- Herbert Westerich (1969–1974)
- Rudolf Schlenker (1975–1980)
- Carl Heinz Illies (1981–1986)
- Peter Möhrle (1987–1990)
- Klaus Asche (1990–1996)
- Nikolaus W. Schües (1996–2002)
- Karl-Joachim Dreyer (2002–2008)
- Frank Horch (2008-2011)
- Fritz Horst Melsheimer (2011-2017)
- Tobias Bergmann (2017-2018)
