= History of Hamburg =

Hamburg was founded in the 9th century. Since the Middle Ages, it has been an important trading center in Europe. The convenient location of the port and its independence as a city and state for centuries strengthened this position.

The city was a member of the medieval Hanseatic trading league and a free imperial city of the Holy Roman Empire. From 1815 until 1866 Hamburg was an independent and sovereign state of the German Confederation, then the North German Confederation (1866–71), the German Empire (1871–1918) and during the period of the Weimar Republic (1918–33). In Nazi Germany Hamburg was a city-state and a Gau from 1934 until 1945. After the Second World War Hamburg was in the British Zone of Occupation and became a state in the western part of Germany in the Federal Republic of Germany (since 1949).

== Etymology ==
According to Ptolemy, the settlement's first name was Treva. A fortress there was named Hammaburg (burg means "fortress"). In Old High German, hamma means 'angle' and hamme means 'pastureland', but the meaning of hamma in this context is unknown. The language spoken was not Old High German, as Low Saxon was spoken there. Other theories hold that the castle was named for the word of a surrounding vast forest, hammen. Hamm as a place name occurs a number of times in Germany, but its meaning is equally uncertain. It could be related to "heim" and Hamburg could have been placed in the territory of the ancient Chamavi. However, a derivation of "home city" is perhaps too direct, as the city was named after the castle. Another theory is that Hamburg comes from ham which is Old Saxon for '(grassy) river bank' or 'meadow/pasture (by a river)'.

== First steps until 1189 AD ==
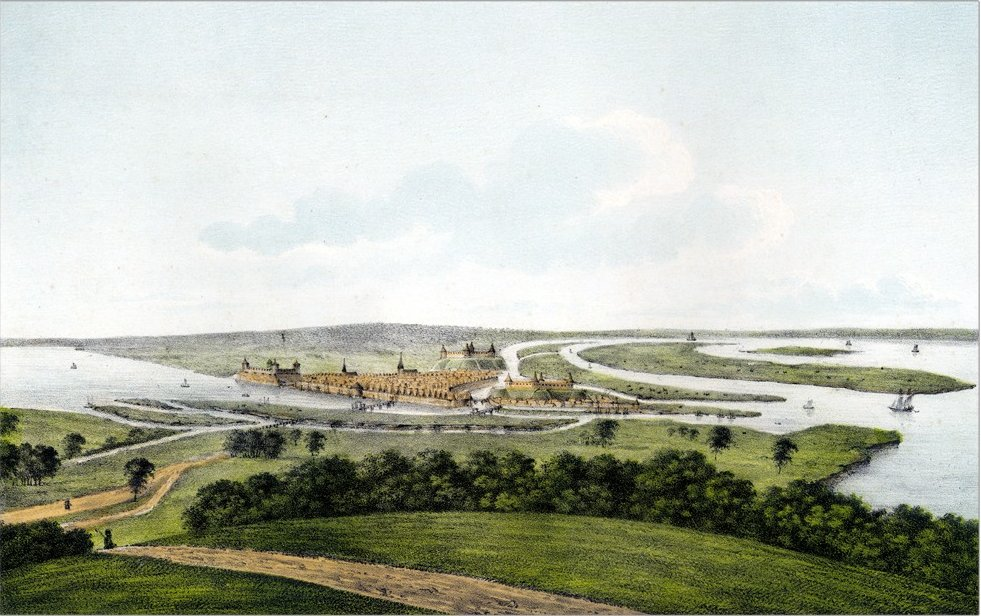
Hamburg in 1150, a 19th-century visualization

The first settlers in the area were a hunting and gathering society in the late Upper Paleolithic and Neolithic, which has several archaeological documented records in the areas of Wellingsbüttel, Meiendorf and Rahlstedt from 20,000 to 8000 BC. In 4000 BC, the first permanent settlements are recorded in the area of Fischbeker Heide. The culture of hunters is named Hamburg culture.

In 808 AD, Emperor Charlemagne ordered a castle built, as a defense against Slavic and Viking intrusions. Charlemagne's son Louis built this castle in 810 on the old trading path from Hedeby in the North to Magdeburg and Bardowick. On 25 December 831, Ansgar was consecrated as the archbishop for the Hammaburg. Ansgar became later known as the Apostle of the North. Ebbo, Archbishop of Reims claimed to have built a baptistery in a small village in this area and this village, Ebbodorp, Eppendorp or Eppendorf, was named after him.

Vikings came up the River Elbe in 845 and destroyed Hamburg, which at that time was a town of around 500 inhabitants. Two years later, Hamburg was united with Bremen as the Bishopric of Hamburg-Bremen. Hamburg was destroyed again in 880, this time by Slavic and Danish soldiers. In 964, Pope Benedict V was deposed and carried off to Hamburg. He died in 965 and was buried in the St. Mary's Cathedral. In 983, the town was destroyed by King Mstivoj of the Obodrites.

There are four famous castles linked to Hamburg in the 11th century. The bishopric castle also known as Bischofsturm was built around 1037 by Bezelin. The Wiedenburg was built in 1043 by Adalbert. The Alsterburg, that never really existed and the Neue Burg built in 1023. After further raids by the Obodrites in 1066, the bishop Adalbert permanently moved to Bremen.

In 1188 Hamburg adopted the Lübeck law (Lübsches Recht), a code of rights superseded in some areas in 1900 by the civil code of Germany (Bürgerliches Gesetzbuch). It is disputed if the law in Hamburg originated from its own law.

== On the way: 1189–1529 ==
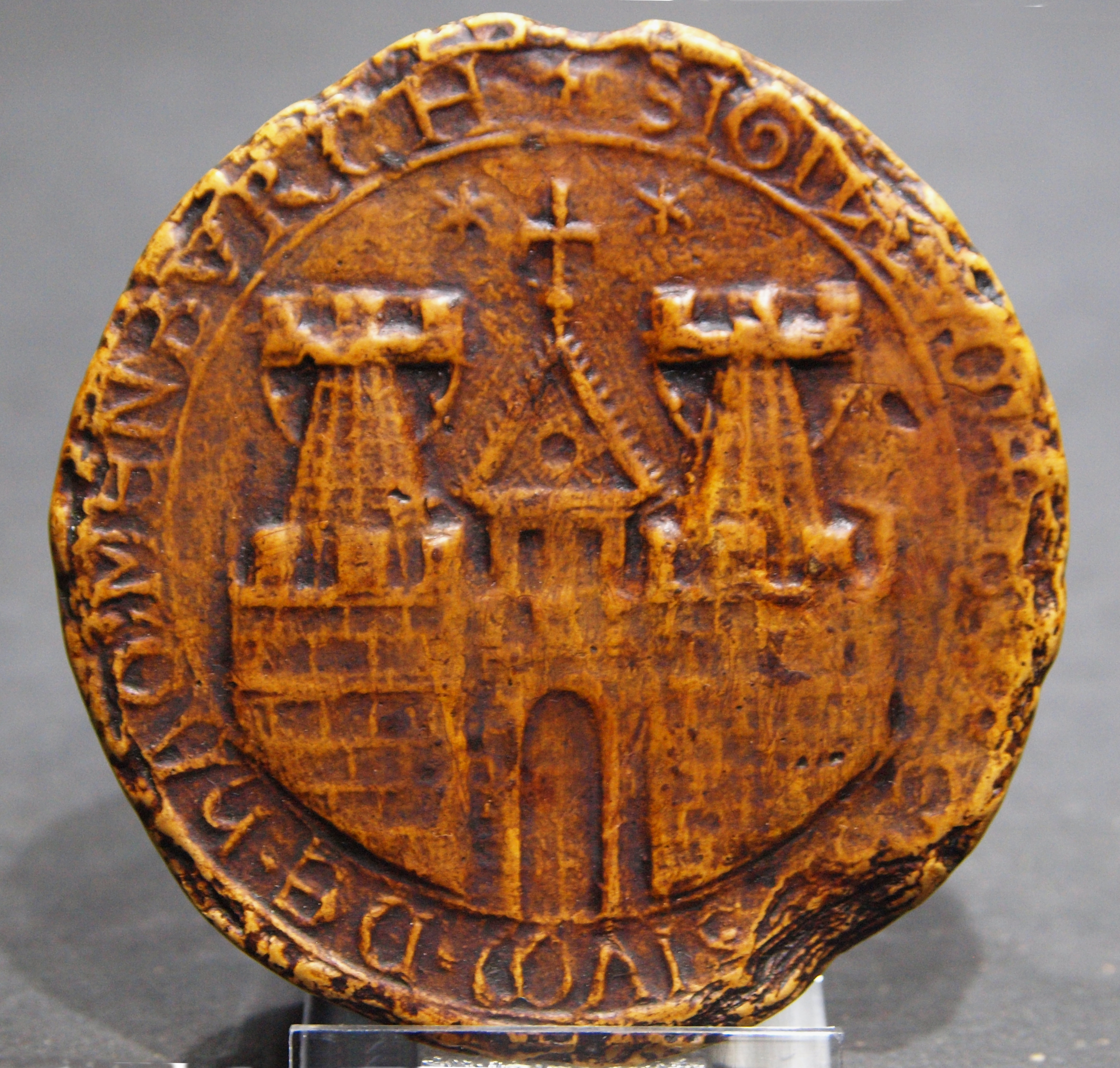
Seal of 1241 (replica)

A charter in 1189 from Frederick I, Holy Roman Emperor granted Hamburg the status of a free imperial city, tax-free access up the Lower Elbe into the North Sea, and the rights to fish, to cut trees and the freedom of military service. The charter was given orally for Hamburg's backing of Frederick's crusades, and in 1265 a letter, in all probability forged, was presented to or by the Rath of Hamburg.

In 1190 the bishop's old city and the count's new city created a noble council (Rath). Valdemar II of Denmark raided and occupied Hamburg in 1201 and in 1214 Frederick II, Holy Roman Emperor, declined all claims of property northern of the river Elbe. Hamburg was controlled by Denmark. The Danish governor united the new and the old parts of Hamburg under one law, town hall and court. A series of Danish defeats culminating in the Battle of Bornhöved on 22 July 1227 cemented the loss of Denmark's northern German territories and liberated Hamburg. Hamburg submitted to Adolf IV of Holstein. Starting in 1230, a new fortification was built. Its layout and names can be found in 2008, e.g. Millerntor-Stadion, named after the western city gate Mildradistor or Mildertor. The park Planten un Blomen is built on the old fortification.

On 5 August 1284 a great fire destroyed all but one residential house in Hamburg. The first description of civil, criminal and procedural law for a city in Germany in German language, the Ordeelbook (Ordeel: sentence) was written by the solicitor of the senate Jordan von Boitzenburg in 1270. In 1350 the Black Death, one of the deadliest pandemics in human history, killed more than 6,000 in Hamburg, half of the city's population.

=== Hanseatic League ===
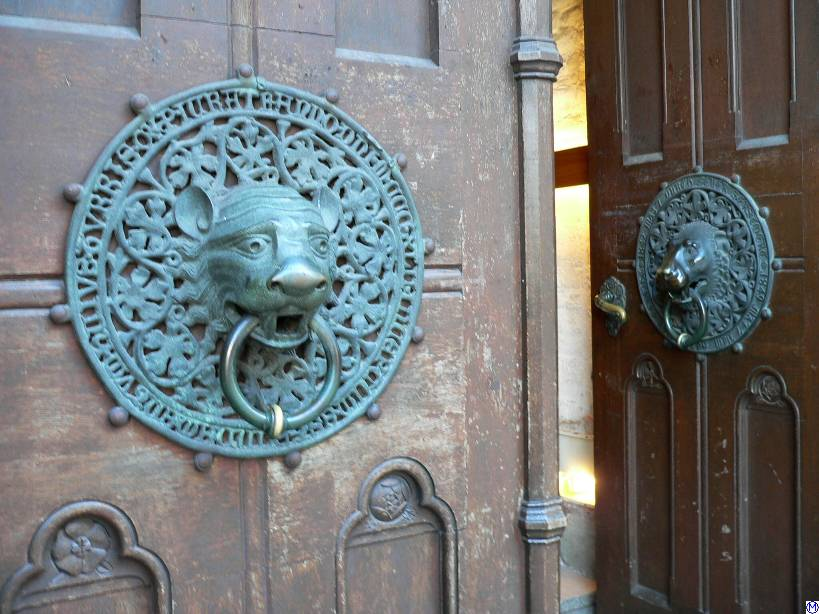
The lion head door handles of Hauptkirche St. Petri date to the late 1300s.

Two contracts between Hamburg and Lübeck in 1241 mark the origin of the powerful Hanseatic League of trading cities. The first contract stated that both cities would defend their freedom and privileges together. The second contract stated that the road between the two cities would be secured against bandits and that deported émigrés would not find shelter in the other city. In 1264 the east–west route for commerce was cobbled in Hamburg. It was the third cobbled road in northern Europe and called Steinstraße, which is still the name of a street in Hamburg.

On 8 November 1266 a contract between Henry III and Hamburg's traders allowed them to establish a hanse in London. This was the first time in history the word hanse was used in connection with the Hanseatic League trading guild. In May 1368 a fleet of 37 ships and 2,000 armed men, including two cogs and 200 men from Hamburg, conquered Copenhagen and razed it to the ground. In 1377 a new currency, the Mark, was established by the Wendischer Münzverein (Wend currency association). The cities Hamburg, Lübeck, Luneburg, Wismar and Rostock formed this association. Hamburg's most important export article was beer. Three tonnes of beer cost one mark. At this time Hamburg's population was 14,000. Hamburg was the third–largest city in the Hanseatic League, after Lübeck and Cologne.

Pirates were a problem for Hamburg and the League. On 21 October 1401 the pirate Klaus Störtebeker was executed in Hamburg, although pirates were often thrown overboard to drown or decapitated shortly after their capture. In 1433 Simon van Utrecht defeated the pirates and conquered Emden. Bremen started a war of capturing ships against Hamburg, Lübeck, Lüneburg and the Netherlands in 1438.

=== First constitution ===
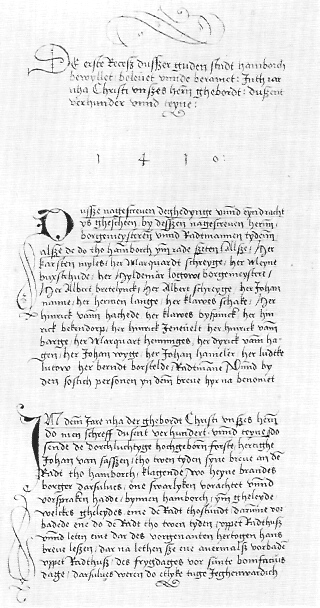
The first Rezeß of 1410

The first constitution of Hamburg was established on 10 August 1410. A civil commotion led to a compromise (German:Rezeß, literally meaning: withdrawal). A citizen, Hein Brandt, had met the duke Johannes IV of Saxe-Lauenburg, who owed Brandt money. Brandt took the duke to task and insulted him. The duke complained to the senate. The senate cited Brandt, who confessed and was arrested. This caused an uproar and citizens formed a council. At this time the senate was formed by the richest citizens, without election, and the senate did not need to provide account for its decisions. The situation in Hamburg was especially unstable because in 1408, members of the senate of Lübeck had found asylum in Hamburg after they were expelled by the citizens of Lübeck.

The formed Council of the Sixty (German: der Sechzigerrat) demanded to free Brandt and to enter into negotiations. The mayor, Kersten Miles, and the senate freed Brandt and agreed after four days of negotiations to a compromise of 20 points. These points included:

- Article 1. No citizen, poor or rich, is to be arrested without a hearing at the senate or a court.
- Article 6. The senate is not allowed to begin a war without a hearing of the citizens.
- Article 10. The senate cannot grant safe conduct for a person who owes a citizen of Hamburg.
- Article 13. When there are disputes between the senate and the citizens, these disputes need to be corrected immediately and are not to be delayed by jurists.
- Article 15. Disloyal public servants need to be discharged.

It is considered to be the first constitution of Hamburg.

== The Lutheran church law and its consequences ==
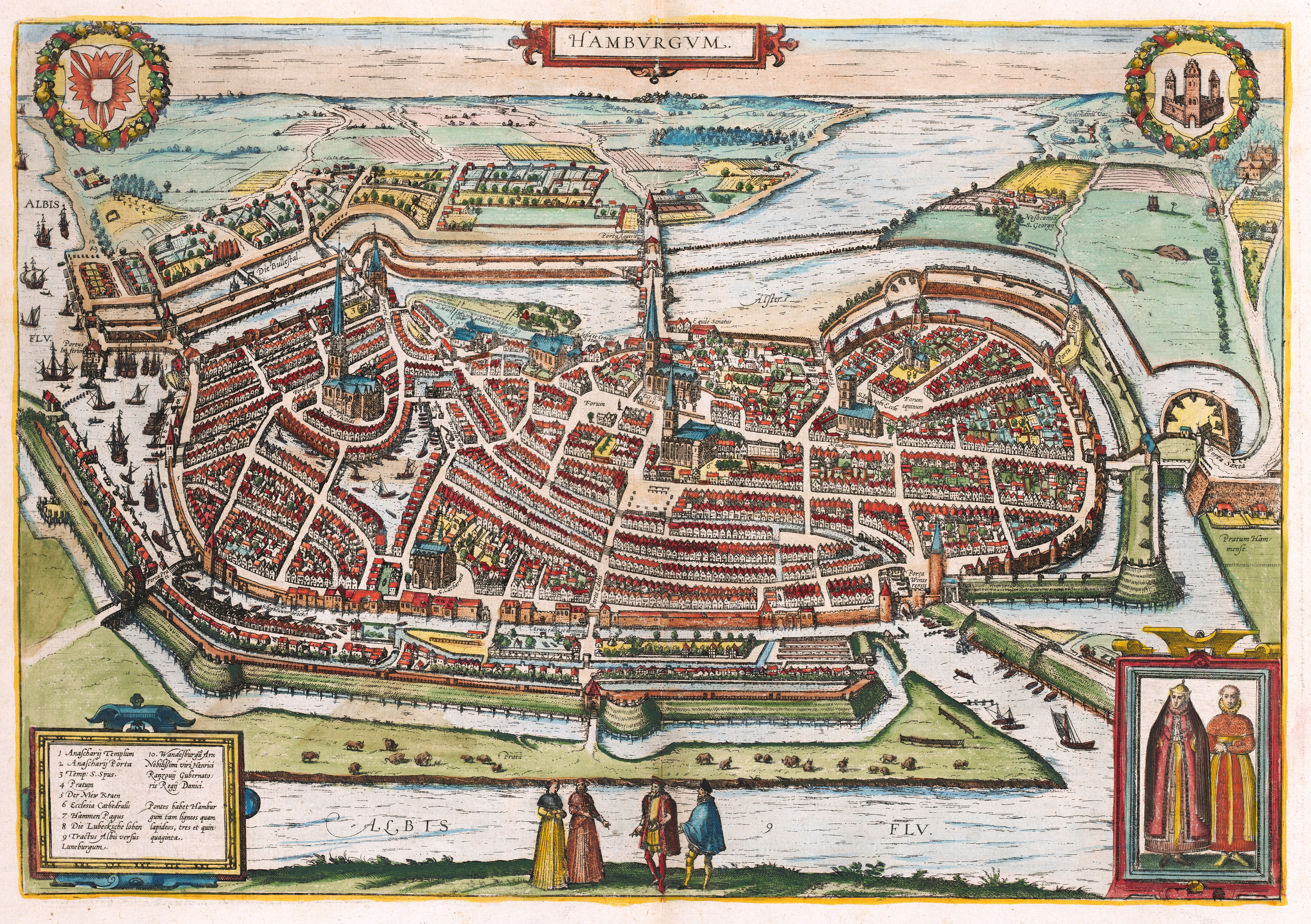
Hamburg by Georg Braun and Franz Hogenberg (1588)

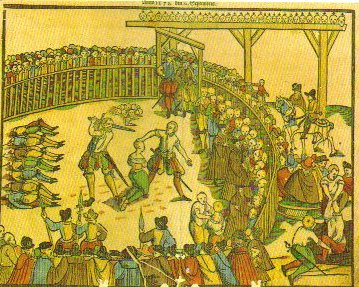
The 1573 execution of pirate Klein Henszlein and his crew, captured by a fleet from Hamburg after 13 years of active piracy in the North Sea

On 15 May 1529 the city embraced Lutheranism. The senate of Hamburg had asked Martin Luther to send his friend and colleague Johannes Bugenhagen to create a new church order. Bugenhagen's work created a state church for Hamburg. The service was held in Low German and the parishes elected their own pastors. There was no iconoclasm in Hamburg mostly because of Johannes Aepinus, the new pastor of St. Petri, who stated the statues of false gods and lying pictures needed to be removed from the churches instantly. He took them down and stored them, so that altarpieces by Meister Bertram and others survived, and are now in the city's museums. At the same time on 24 February, the long compromise (German: Langer Rezeß) reorganized the political system. The senate, now 24 aldermen, held the executive and judicial authority. But without the council of the citizens, no laws could be enacted. The councils were elected by the 4 parishes. The parishes were now also administrative divisions of the city. In May 1531 the cathedral chapter closed the Catholic cathedral, it only reopened as Lutheran proto-cathedral in 1540. Roman Catholics lost their citizenship and were challenged to leave the city, although remaining Catholics could practice their religion in the small chapels of the diplomatic missions of the Holy Roman Empire. Not until 1785 did the senate acknowledge a small community.

In 1558 the Hamburg stock market was founded. In 1567 Hamburg asked a group of English traders to settle in the city. This was in conflict with the rules of the Hanseatic League, but Hamburg used the taxes to downsize the public debt. The cause of this debt was Hamburg's contribution to the Schmalkaldic War (1546–1552) between the Lutheran dukes and cities and the emperor.

== Modern history ==
=== 17th and 18th centuries ===
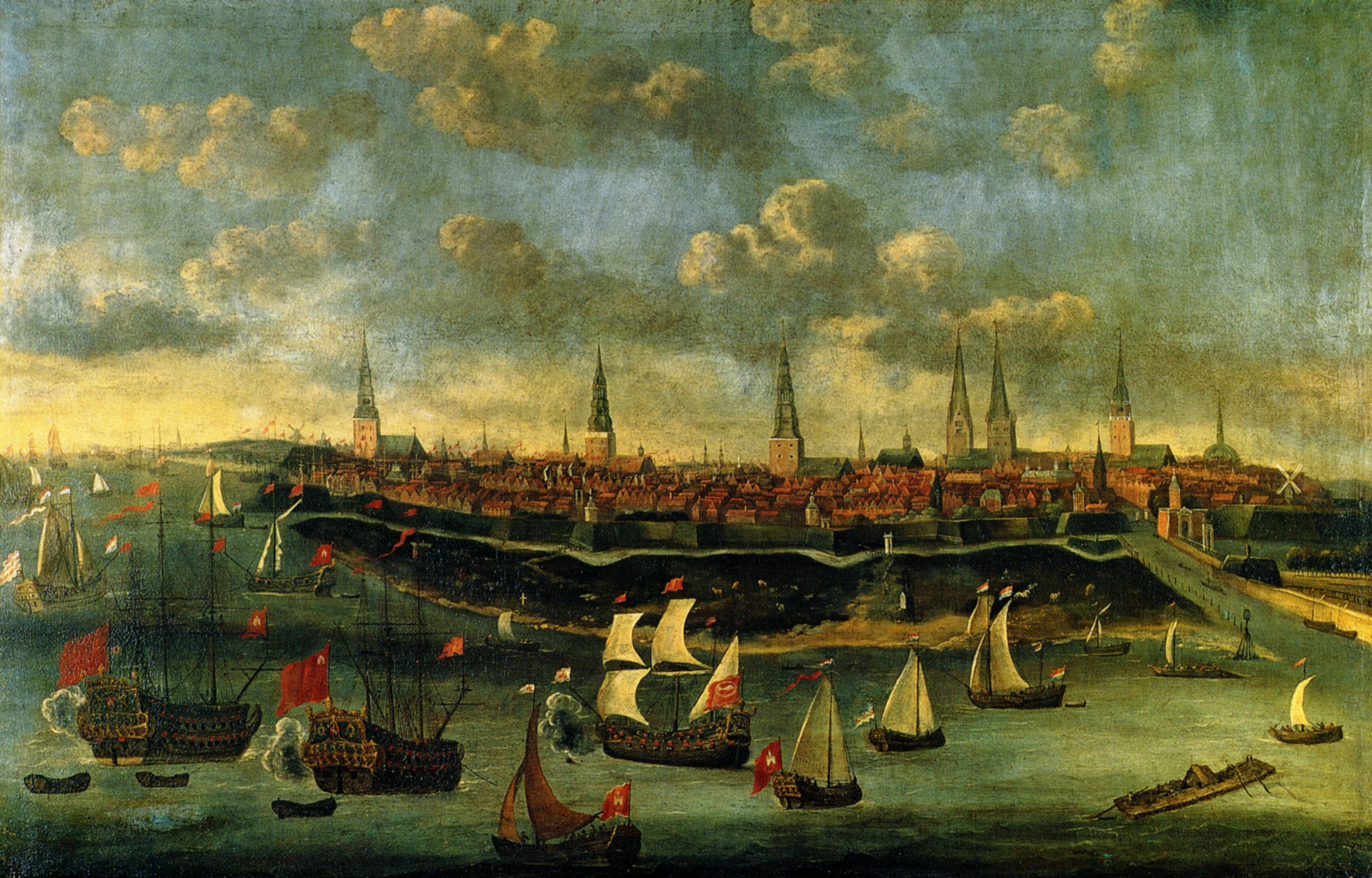
Hamburg in 1680

When the Senate commissioned Jan van Valckenborgh to build a second layer to the city's fortifications to protect against the Thirty Years War (1618–1648), Hamburg was also extended by the newly created "New Town" (Neustadt). Some of these street names still date from the grid system of roads he introduced. In the late 1580s, the first Sephardi Jews arrived—fleeing from Portugal—and built a Portuguese Jewish community in Hamburg. In 1610, official lists of the senate counted about 100 Jewish families. Lutheran theologians preached against them, especially the "schools of Satan"—meaning the synagogues—and in 1611 the senate had to ask the Lutheran theological faculties of Jena and Frankfort for their opinions. The faculties attested to the senate that the Jews should be tolerated in the town as strangers. The safety in person was granted; however, several assaults, often triggered by Christian homilies, against individual Jews took place. The community was not to be allowed to practise its religion publicly, but small private praying rooms were overlooked. Not until 1660 could the first small synagogue be built.

In 1664 the senate of Hamburg enacted a law to protect the swans of the city. Hard punishments would be given if a swan was beaten to death, insulted, shot or eaten. A popular belief (omen) is that Hamburg will be free and Hanseatic so long as swans are living on the Alster river.

In 1712/13, the plague raged in Hamburg and Altona. The latter was burned down by a trespassing Swedish army (Altona was not part of Hamburg at the time); Sweden's adversaries retaliated by burning down Wolgast in Swedish Pomerania.

In 1762 the city was briefly occupied by Danish forces who were trying to raise money to fight a coming war with Russia.

=== 19th century ===
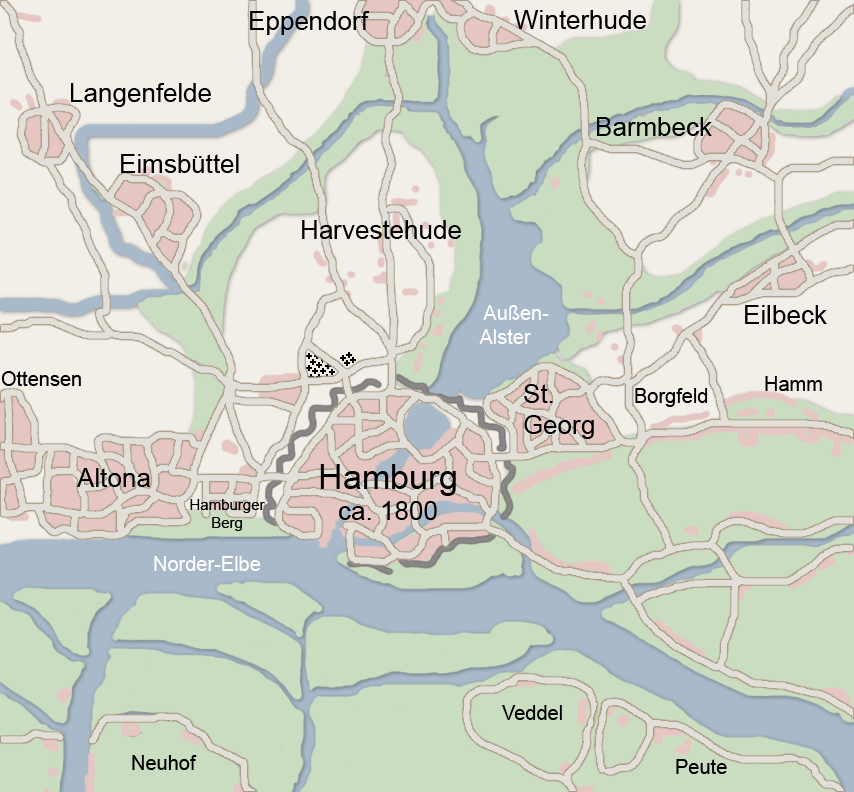
Hamburg in 1800

Briefly annexed by Napoleon I (1810–14), Hamburg, with a population of about 100 000, was the capital of the department Bouches-de-l'Elbe, with Amandus Augustus Abendroth as the new mayor. Hamburg suffered severely during the Continental Blockade and Napoleon's last campaign in Germany but managed to raise two forces to fight against him, the Hamburg Citizen Militia and Hanseatic Legion. The city was besieged for over a year by Allied forces (mostly Russian, Swedish and German). Russian forces under General Bennigsen finally freed the city in 1814. In addition to stimulating German nationalism, the war had a major impact in mobilizing a civic spirit in numerous volunteer activities. Many volunteer militias and civic associations were formed, and collaborated with churches, and the press to support local and state armies, patriotic wartime mobilization, humanitarian relief and postwar commemorative practices and rituals.

City state of Hamburg in 1890

Hamburg was a member of the 39-state German Confederation from 1814 to 1866 and, as the other member-states, enjoyed full sovereignty. After periodic political unrest, particularly in 1848, the self-ruling city-state adopted a democratic constitution in 1860 that provided for the election of the Senate, the governing body of the city-state, by adult taxpaying males. Other innovations were the separation of powers, the separation of Church and State, freedom of the press, of assembly and association. Hamburg became a member of the North German Confederation (1866–71), the German Empire (1871–1918), while in 1888 it was one of the last two states to join the German Customs Union (along with Bremen) and was to maintain its self-ruling status during the Weimar Republic (1919–33).

During the first half of the 19th century a patron goddess with Hamburg's Latin name Hammonia emerged, mostly in romantic and poetic references, and although she has no mythology to call her own, Hammonia became the symbol of the city's spirit during this time.

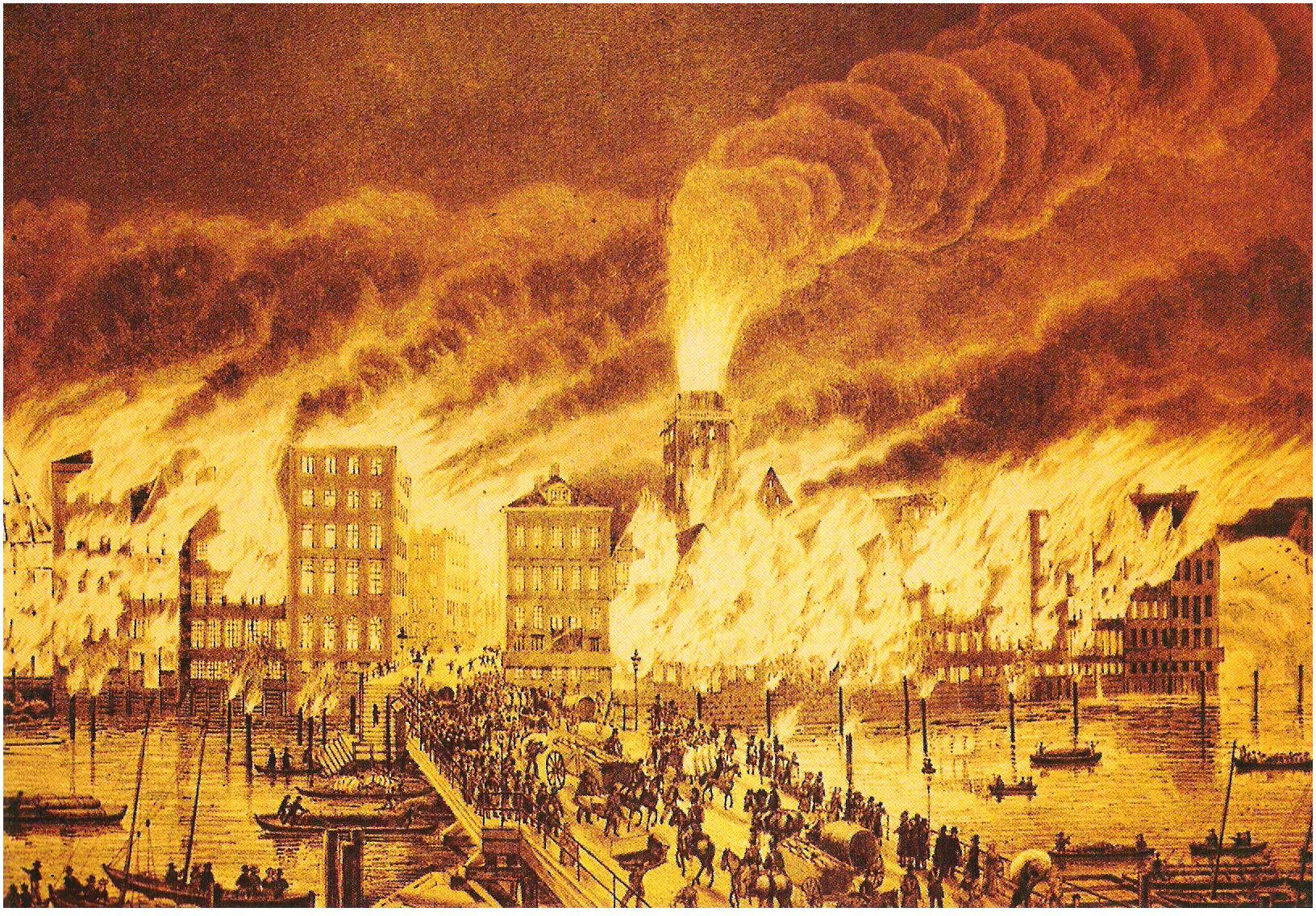
The great fire 1842, by Peter Suhr, 1842

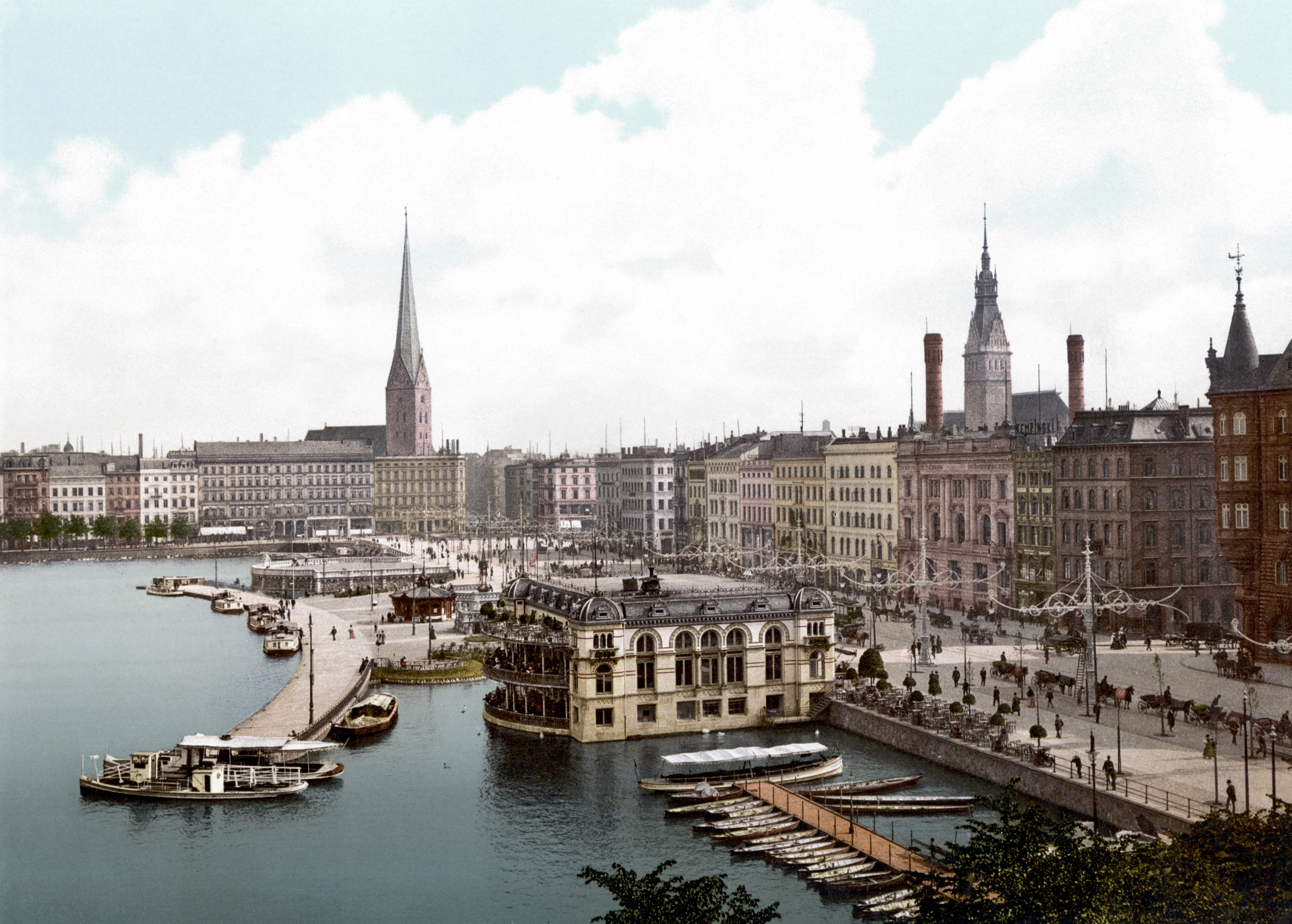
Hamburg's central promenade Jungfernstieg on River Alster in 1900

In 1842, about a third of the city was destroyed in the "Great Fire". This fire started on the night of 4 May 1842 and was extinguished on 8 May. It destroyed three churches, the town hall, and countless other buildings. It killed 51 people, and left an estimated 20,000 homeless. Reconstruction took more than 40 years. As part of the reconstruction, the first large modern sanitation system in Europe was built in Hamburg.

Hamburg experienced its fastest growth during the second half of the 19th century, when its population more than quadrupled to 800,000 as the growth of the city's Atlantic trade helped make it Europe's third-largest port. Construction of the port lead to the disappearance of several of the smaller of Hamburg's many rivers and channels, such as the Dradenau.

A major outbreak of cholera in 1892 was very badly handled by the city government, which still retained an unusual degree of independence for a German city at the time. About 8,600 died in the largest German epidemic of the late 19th century, and the last major cholera epidemic in an important city in the Western world. The Hamburg water supply from the Elbe did not meet modern standards, and the authorities long continued to deny there was an epidemic, or implement the new understanding of the germ theory of disease. The imperial government used the scandal to greatly reduce the powers of the city authorities.

=== 20th century ===
With Albert Ballin as its director the Hamburg-America Line became the world's largest transatlantic shipping company around the start of the 20th century, and Hamburg was also home to shipping companies to South America, Africa, India and East Asia. Hamburg became a cosmopolitan metropolis based on worldwide trade. Hamburg was the port for most Germans and Eastern Europeans to leave for the New World and became home to trading communities from all over the world (like a small Chinatown in Altona, Hamburg).

In 1903, the world's first organised club for social and family nudism, Freilichtpark (Open-air Park) was opened in Hamburg. It was located on a lake formed by the Alster River in the southern part of the city, adjoining a bathing beach. After World War I Germany lost her colonies and Hamburg lost many of its trade routes.

=== Weimar Republic ===
In early November 1918, during the first days of the German revolution of 1918–1919, revolutionary workers and soldiers took over Hamburg's government with minimal violence or loss of life. They held a free, equal and universal election in March 1919 for a new Bürgerschaft (parliament) that was to write a republican constitution for the city-state. Despite its revolutionary nature, the new Bürgerschaft chose to leave much of the city's administration intact and some of the members of the pre-war Senate in their posts. The new constitution kept a large part of the external form of the oligarchic pre-war Hamburg government while making it republican in function. The Bürgerschaft was freely elected by the full adult citizenry of Hamburg, and the 16-member Senate, chosen by the Bürgerschaft, acted as the state ministry dependent on the confidence of the Bürgerschaft. The willingness of the moderate socialists and bourgeoisie to work together contributed to Hamburg's stability during the Weimar Republic. The only major incident of violence occurred on 23 October 1923. In the Hamburg Uprising, communists attempted to take over the city as part of the larger German October centered in central Germany, but they lacked broad support, and the insurrection was quickly quashed by Hamburg's police force; about 100 people, many of them bystanders, lost their lives.

Until after the Nazi seizure of power in January 1933, the Hamburg government was dominated by the parties of the moderate left to moderate right. Especially between 1924 and 1929, it made democratic reforms in such areas as working conditions, housing, education, work training and social welfare. The Great Depression, which began in 1929, hit Hamburg hard, especially its shipbuilding. The percentage of unemployed residents rose to 40% by June 1933. As in the rest of the Weimar Republic, the communists and Nazi Party benefitted most from the crisis, with the two together taking 47% of the vote in the 1932 Bürgerschaft election. Due to a parliamentary deadlock, however, the centrist coalition that had governed Hamburg since 1928 remained in office on a caretaker basis until 8 March 1933.

=== Nazi Germany ===
Following their seizure of power at the national level, the Nazi government embarked on a policy of Gleichschaltung (coordination) by which they intended to eliminate any potential sources of opposition in the states. On 3 March 1933, the Nazi Interior Minister, Wilhelm Frick demanded that the Hamburg Senate suppress the Social Democratic newspaper in Hamburg. When the Senate acquiesced, the three Social Democratic members of the Senate resigned, including the Police Senator. The next day, the Senate President also handed in his resignation. Further demands for the appointment of a Nazi Party member to head the police were refused by the remaining senators, and public disturbances led by the SA stormtroopers and Nazi members of the police broke out. Taking advantage of the chaos, Frick used the authority of the Reichstag Fire Decree on 5 March to appoint an SA officer to take direct control of the police to restore order.

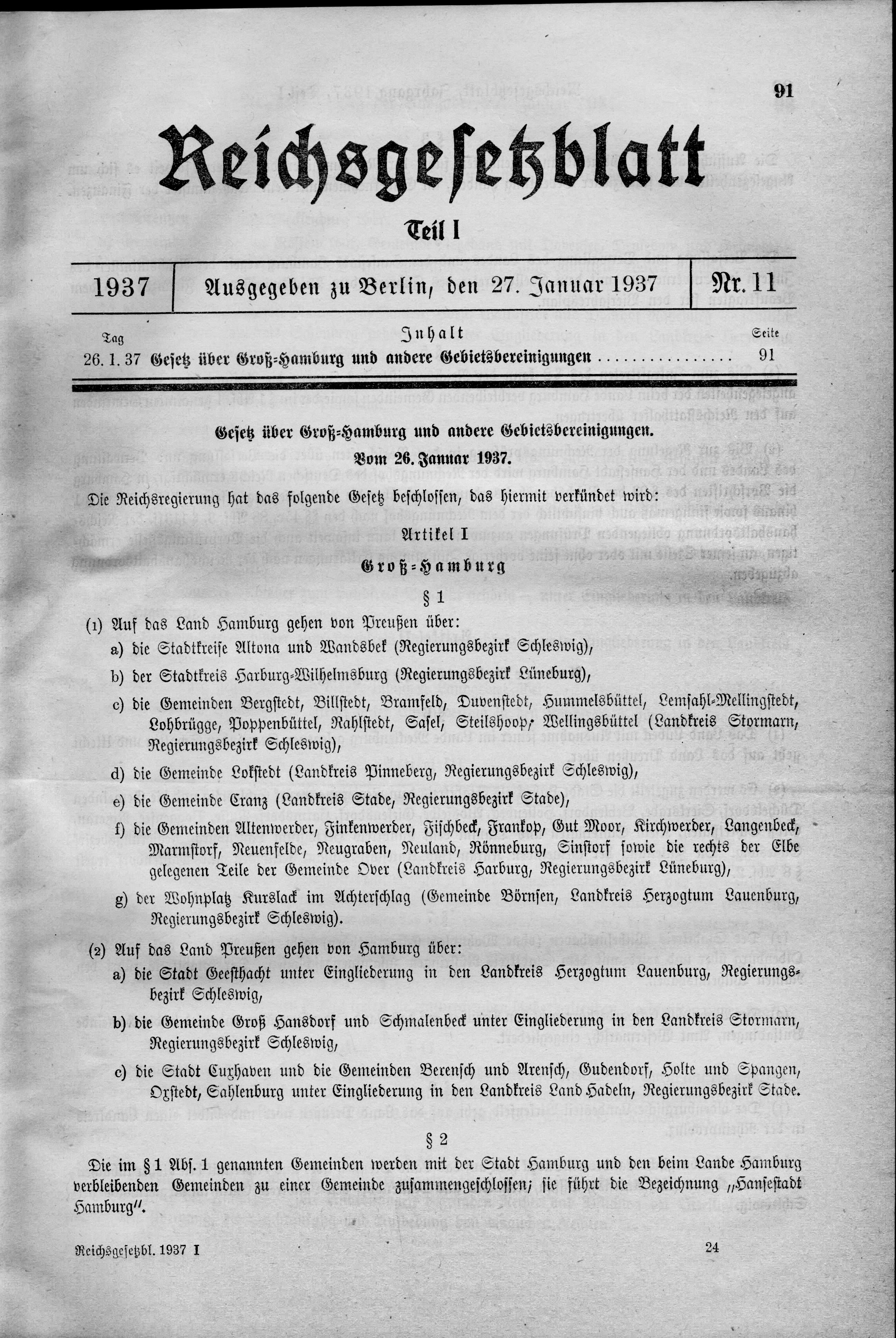
Promulgation of the Greater Hamburg Act in the Reichsgesetzblatt of 27 January 1937

On 8 March 1933, the Bürgerschaft (state parliament) elected Carl Vincent Krogmann as President of the Senate and Bürgermeister (mayor), and he formed a coalition administration dominated by Nazis but also containing members of the bourgeois parties. From 18 May 1933, he bore the official title of Regierender Bürgermeister (Governing Mayor). On 7 April, the Reich government enacted the "Second Law on the Coordination of the States with the Reich" that established more direct control over the states by means of the new powerful position of Reichsstatthalter (Reich Governor). Karl Kaufmann, the Nazi Party Gauleiter for Hamburg, was installed in this new post on 16 May. Under the provisions of the "Law on the Reconstruction of the Reich" of 30 January 1934, the Bürgerschaft was abolished altogether and all the state's sovereign powers passed to the central government. The state government continued de jure but it was de facto a mere administrative unit of the Reich. A bitter rivalry existed between Krogmann and Kaufmann over jurisdiction of the city-state. On 29 July 1936, this was resolved in Kaufmann's favor when Hitler granted him the title of Führer der Landesregierung (Leader of the State Government).

Effective 1 April 1937, the "Greater Hamburg Act" (26 January 1937) greatly extended the city boundaries to incorporate the Prussian cities of Altona, Harburg-Wilhelmsburg and Wandsbek, in addition to over two dozen smaller rural towns and villages. In return, Hamburg ceded a few exclaves, including Cuxhaven. Hamburg was named Hansestadt Hamburg (Hanseatic City of Hamburg). Effective 1 April 1938, the Constitution of Hamburg was altered through the "Law of the Constitution and Administration of Hamburg" (9 December 1937). This formalized the division of Hamburg into separate state and municipal administrations. Kaufmann remained in charge of the state government and received the lion's share of the power and authority. The Hamburg Senate and the position of Governing Mayor of Hamburg were abolished. Krogmann's title was downgraded to Mayor and he was left with only municipal administration.

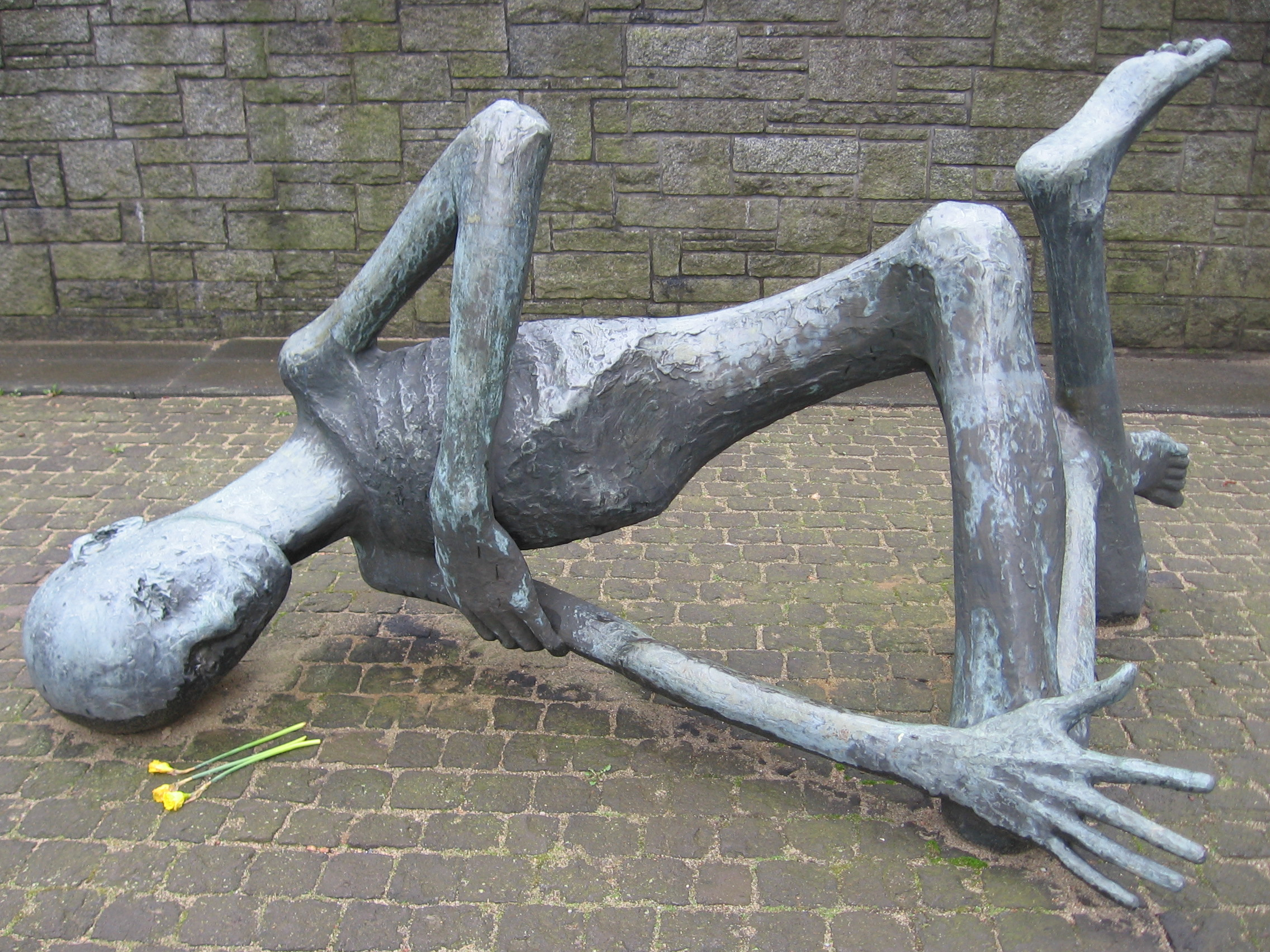
The sculpture „Der sterbende Häftling“ (The Dying Prisoner) at the memorial site of the Neuengamme concentration camp. The camp operated from 1938 to 1945 in the Neuengamme neighbourhood of Hamburg.

During World War II Hamburg suffered a series of devastating air raids which killed 42,000 German civilians. British bombers dropped 23,000 tons of bombs, the Americans dropped 16,000 tons. As the bombings continued more and more people moved out. By May 1945 half a million people (35%) had fled.

Through this, and the new zoning guidelines of the 1960s, the inner city lost much of its architectural past. From 1938 until 1945 a concentration camp was established in the Neuengamme quarter of Hamburg, the Neuengamme concentration camp, some of the buildings have been preserved and as of 2008 serve as a memorial. From 1939 until 1945 more than 500,000 men, women and children — including prisoners of war — were forced to work at more than 900 companies, living in more than 1,200 camps all over Hamburg. Some of these camps held only 7 inmates, others were known for more than 1,500 inmates.

=== After the Second World War ===
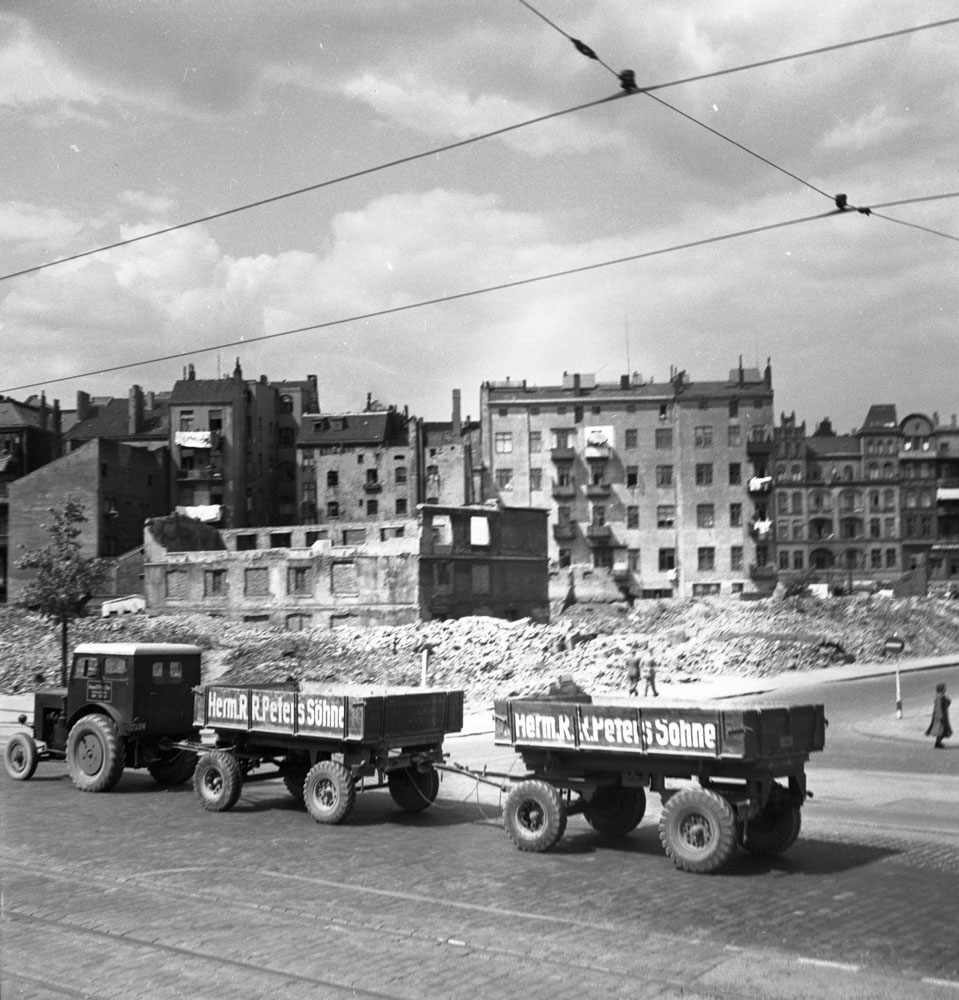
Buildings ruined by air raids

After the end of the Second World War until the end of the Besatzungsstatut, Hamburg was a British-occupied city from 1945 to 1949. Specially George Ayscough Armytage and Governor Henry V. Berry identified with the city and worked through the indirect rule, asking prospective Hamburg inhabitants to resume office in the administration. Denazification and rebuilding of the society proceeded, e.g. in Hamburg were the important trials for war crimes (Hamburg Ravensbrück Trials) held at the Curio house in Rotherbaum quarter, and Radio Hamburg, a public broadcasting radio station, was established on 4 May 1945, even before the capitulation.

The Iron Curtain — only 50 kilometres (30 mi) east of Hamburg — separated the city from most of its hinterland and further reduced Hamburg's global trade. On 16 February 1962 a severe storm caused the Elbe to rise to an all-time high, inundating one fifth of Hamburg and killing more than 300 people.

=== Since the 2000s ===
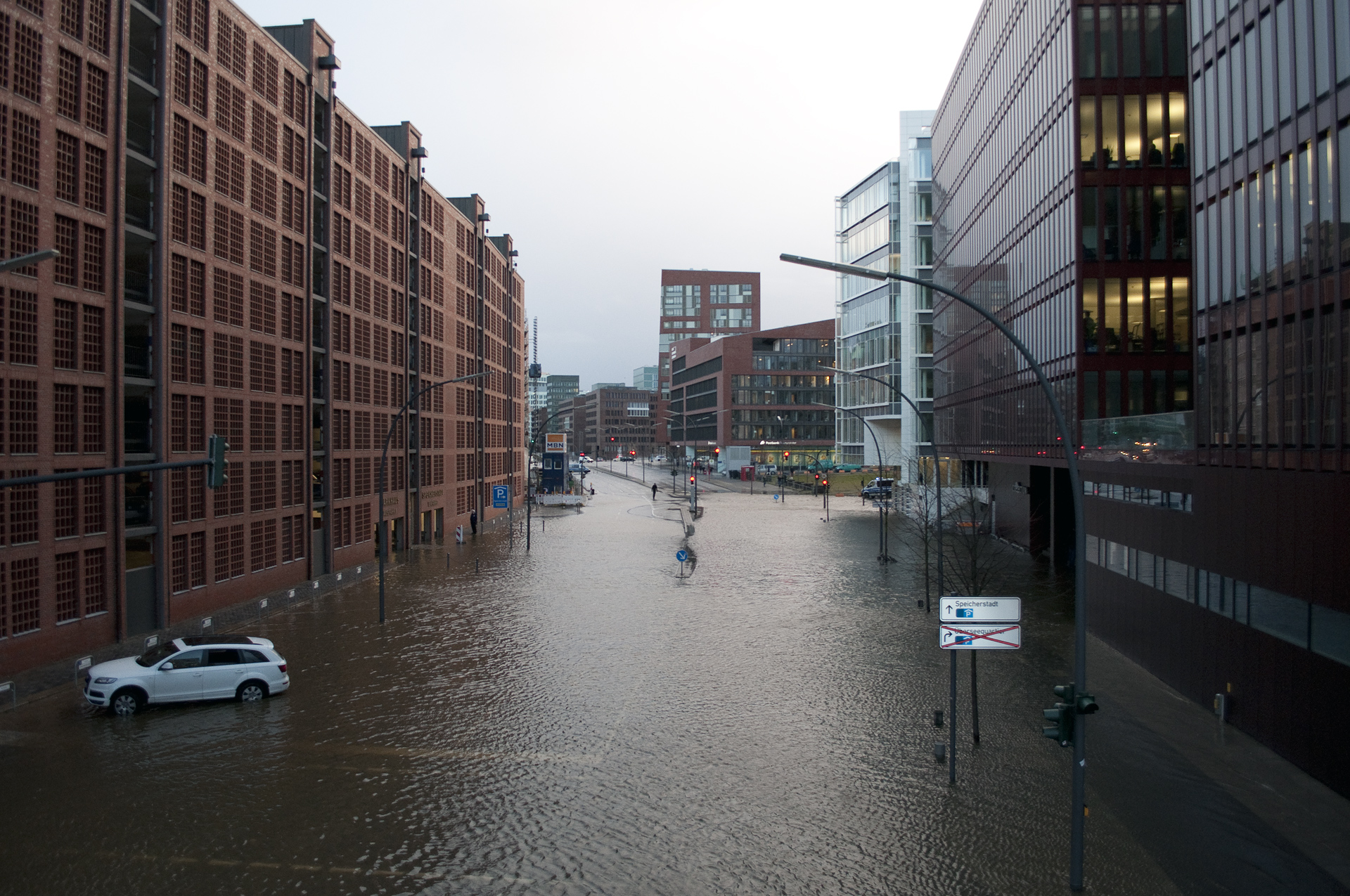
Floods caused by Cyclone Xaver in HafenCity on 6 December 2013

After German reunification in 1990, and the accession of some Eastern European and Baltic States into the EU in 2004, Hamburg Harbour and Hamburg have ambitions for regaining their positions as the region's largest deep-sea port for container shipping and its major commercial and trading centre.

In 2008, started the conversion of a section of the old Port of Hamburg facilities in the Elbe river island of Grasbrook into a mixed-used development called HafenCity. The project includes modern office space, housing blocks, parks, and the flagship building Elbphilharmonie, designed by Swiss architects Herzog & de Meuron and inaugurated in January 2017. The landscape projects in the redevelopment included open spaces designed by EMBT Architects (see Benedeta Taglibue) and the flood-protection and river promenade designed by Zaha Hadid.

In 2015, a section to the north of the HafenCity called Speicherstadt was granted the UNESCO World Heritage Site status with the adjacent Kontorhausviertel.

On 7 and 8 July 2017, the G20 summit took place in Hamburg, accompanied by protests and riots.

== See also ==
- Postage stamps and postal history of Hamburg
- Timeline of Hamburg history (extended version)
