= Neue Burg (Hamburg) =

One of the four famous castles in medieval Hamburg

Coordinates: 53°32′52″N 9°59′27″E

The New Castle (Hamburg) or Neue Burg was a medieval saxonian castle in the town of Hamburg and is the successor to the Hammaburg. In the 11th century it was the biggest castle in northern Germany and the last one built in the traditional saxonian style, only consisting of wood and earth.

== Location and surroundings ==
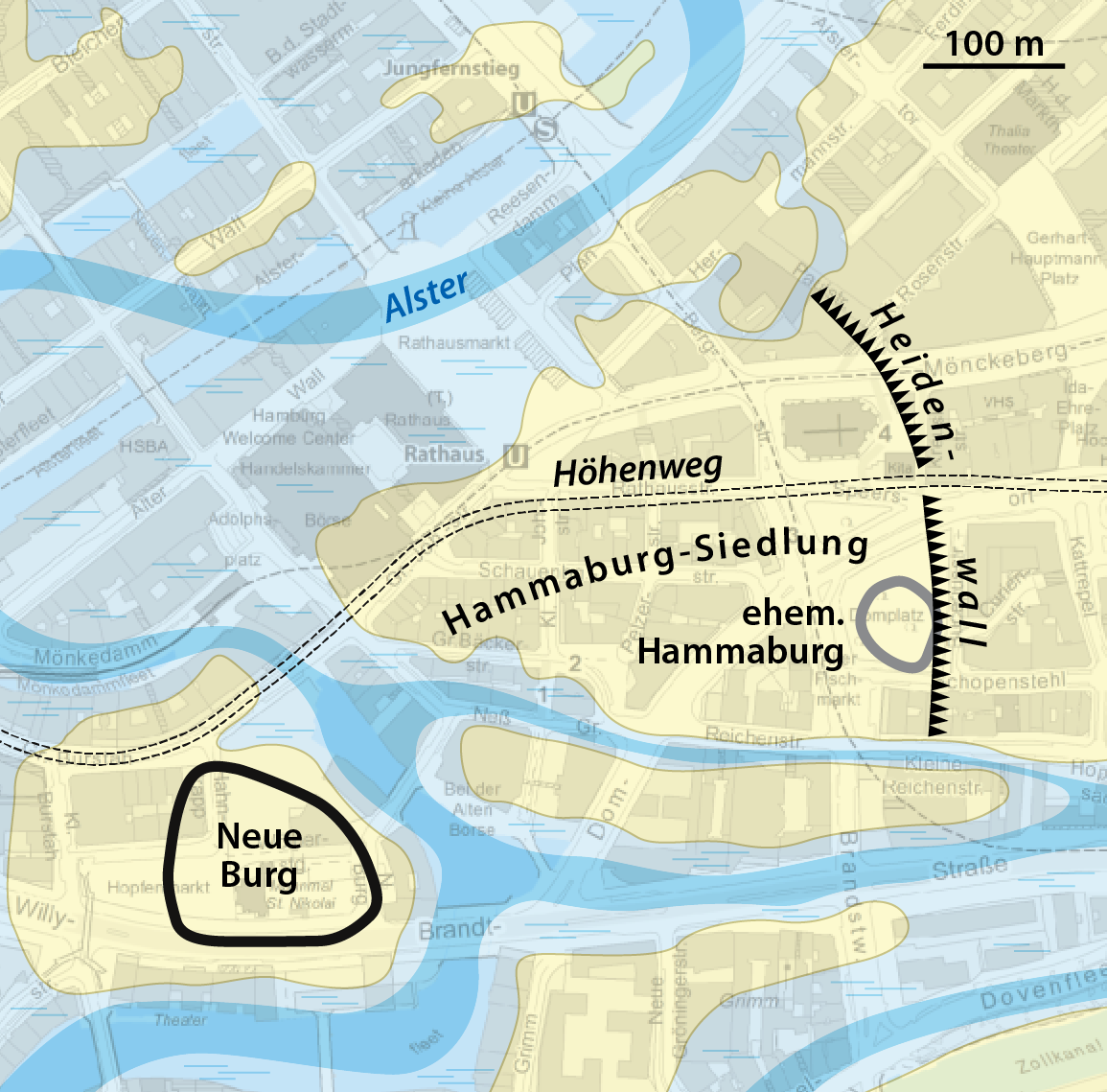
Map of Hamburg showing the Hammaburg and its successor the New Castle

The castle was located between Alster and Elbe, near what is now called the Nikolaifleet canal. It had two ports, one in the north opening up to an old trade route and one in the east that led to the harbor. The trade route in the north is the same that passed the old Hammaburg. It leads to the Ochsenweg, which was the main traffic artery through what is now Schleswig-Holstein and the Danish peninsula Jylland.

The shape of the castle is nearly oval. An irregularity lies in the south-west, where it becomes rectangular. It is unknown if the Neue Burg was located on an island, or if there was access from the west. If the latter, a moat at the west-wall is to be anticipated.

== Construction ==
The structure of its defense wall is capable of holding back the high tides and is therefore built like a typical dam. The wall had a tree containing core, shaped like two camel humps filled up with earth in the middle and topped with earth and turf. The castle was 171 meters in width and 156 meters in lengths. The wall surrounded an area of 7800 m^{2} and is estimated to have been 36 meters in width. A palisade is thought to be on the wall. This theory is based on excavations of similar saxonian castles.

Although the Neue Burg was the biggest fortification of northern Germany at its time, other castles consisting of wood and earth, built some hundred kilometers to the north, outsized it by a lot. It is tiny in comparison to the Danish king Harald Bluetooth' Aggersborg built forty years earlier, which was nearly as big as the settlement of Hamburg.

Its construction is also quiet similar to medieval slawik castles, only that its Wall contains significantly less stabilising wooden structures in its core.

== History ==
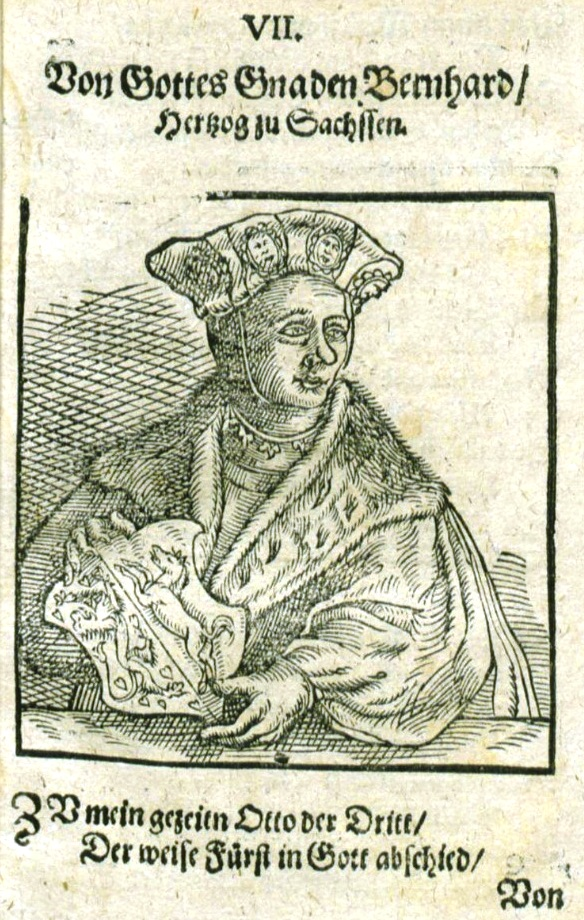
Bernhard II Duke of Saxony. Client for the construction of The New Castle

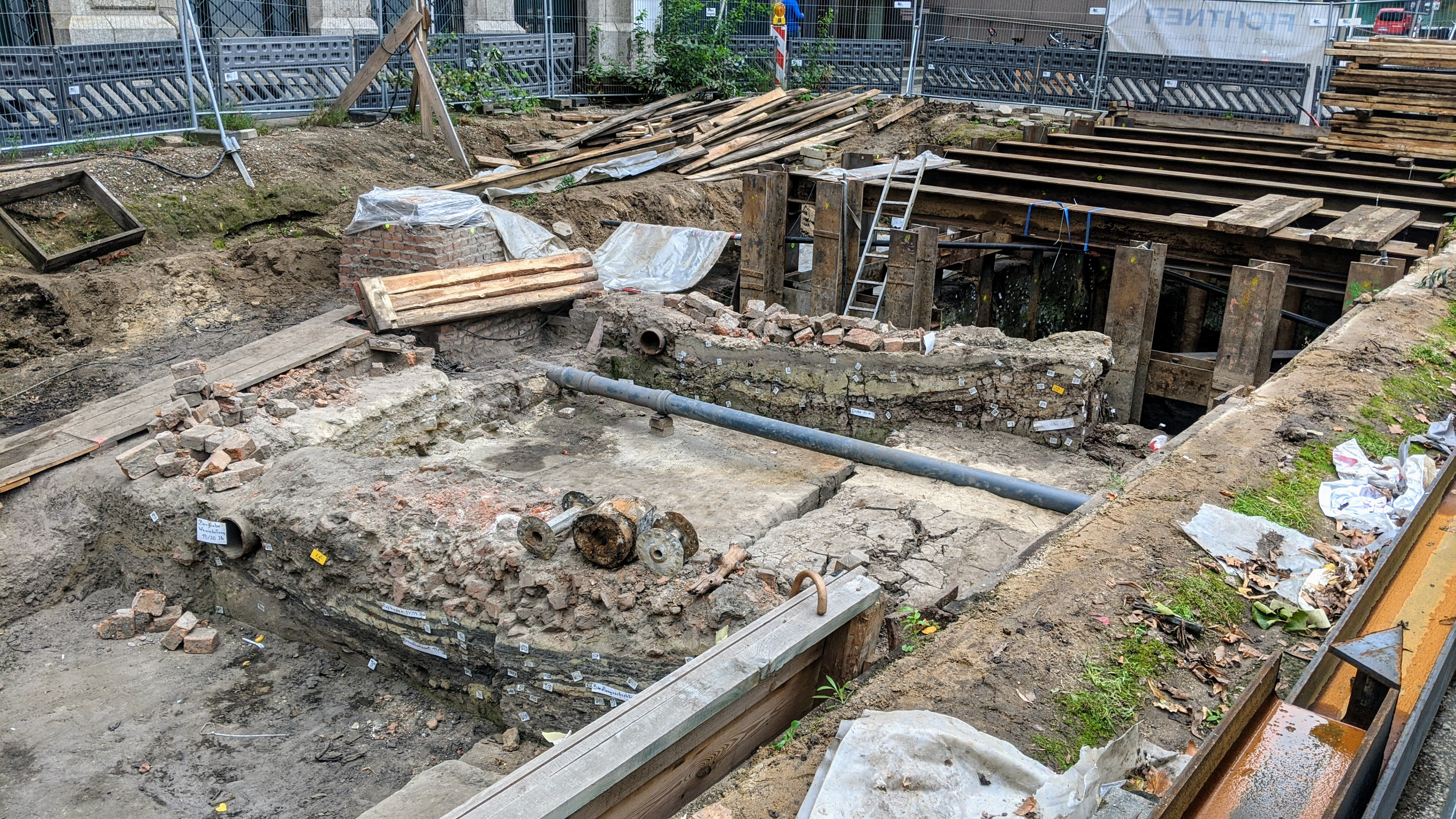
Excavation site in Hamburg Neue Burg (New Castle) 2020

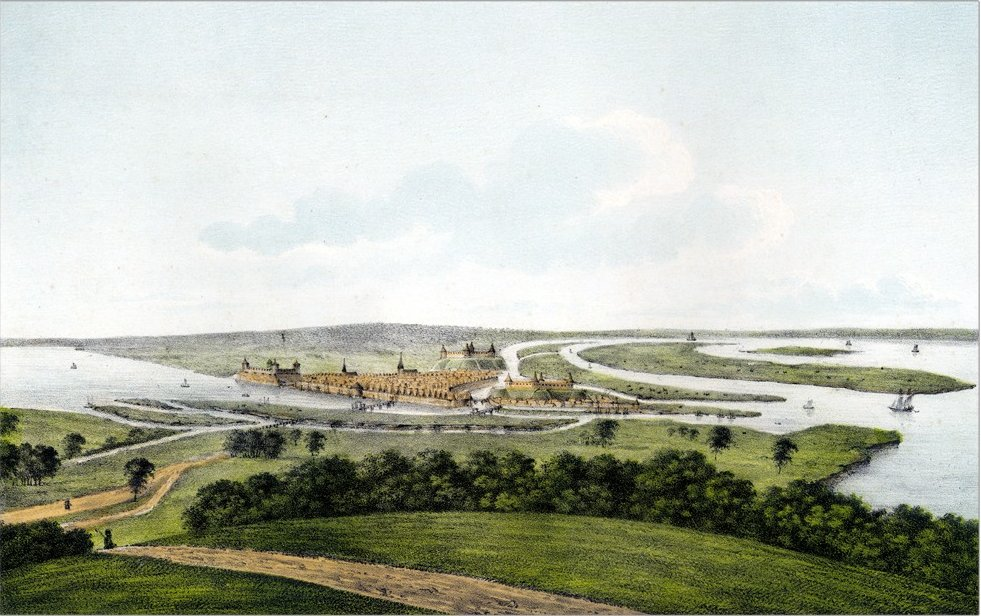
From left to right: the Alsterburg, the Hammaburg and the New Castle. This image shows a misconception, because those castles did not exist at the same time.

The Neue Burg existed from 1023 until 1139. It was the successor of the Hammaburg, which got abandoned in the early 1020s. It belonged to the Billungers, a saxonian dynasty of noblemen that ruled as dukes over the saxonian lands and marches including Hamburg from 936 to 1106. The castle was built from 1021 to 1023. Minor wooden additions dated to the year 1024, were found during the newest excavations, but these were so insignificant that they could not count as part of the essential building process. They supposedly were integrated after the castle already was inhabited and functional.

In 1066 and 1072 Hamburg and the New castle got attacked by slawik troops, but the castle came back to use both times. In 1110 the castle became possession of the Schauenburger dynasty. 1139 the castle came out of function after it got destroyed by a third, this time fatal attack. At least this is what the chronologist Helmold wrote. The following fifty years the castle was out of use, until Adolf of Schauenburg 1188 founded a new city district on top of what had been the Neue Burg. For that purpose the abandoned castle got filled up with earth and a platform was formed to create a safe place against the tides and strormfloods.

== Chronology of archaeological excavations ==
The lack of medieval structures in modern Hamburg turned out to be a problem for archaeological research in relation to medieval castles in general. After Hamburg burned down in 1842, the medieval period got erased entirely. Even the churches are mere reconstructions of reconstructions.

1953: Led by H.G. Steffens. The very first parts of the surrounding wall were discovered. As a result, the Neue Burg could be located in the vicinity of the Nikolaikirche. The excavation was led by H.G. Steffens who dated the castle in the 11th century based on some pingsdorf ceramic shards his team found.

1968/69: It was possible to discover a port in the North. The excavation site was severely damaged and disturbed by construction works at this time, so the undertaking was hasty and restricted in its possible outcome.

2014/2015: Location: Hopfenmarkt. Led by: Kay-Peter Suchowa. Thanks to dendrochronological analysis, it was possible to date the construction of the castle at round about 1021–1025. This was significantly earlier than Adam of Bremen suggested. As a consequence his telling got proven wrong and the time gap between the existence of the Hammaburg and the Neue Burg was closed.

2019/2020: Location: Neue Burg. Due to the good shape of the discovered oak, the construction period of the Neue Burg could further be restricted to the period between 1021 and 1023.

== Debunked myths ==
One author is especially mentionable concerning the writing of history about the origins of the Neue Burg. Adam von Bremen wrote in 1075, what became long believed origin of the Neue Burg. Adam said, the castle was in possession of Ordulf and built in 1061. This myth got debunked in 2014, from research following the excavations superviced by Kai-Peter Suchowa. Adam misdated the castle about forty years and linked it to Ordulf, the son of Bernhard II, who is the real founder of the Neue Burg. A total misconception, which was upheld until the start of the 21st century and also could be falsified with dendrochnological analysis in 2014, was that the famous medieval castles: Alsterburg, Hammaburg and the Neue Burg existed at the same time.

== Literature ==
- Rainer-Maria Weiss (edit): Burgen in Hamburg. Eine Spurensuche. Wachholz, Kiel 2021, ISBN 978-3-529-05070-1
- Kay-Peter Suchowa: Erkenntnisse zur Neuen Burg und Nikolaikirche. Jahrbuch des Alstervereins 2016/2017. Hamburg 2016
- Rainer-Maria Weiss: Hammaburg. Wie alles begann. Wachholtz, Kiel/Hamburg 2016, ISBN 978-3-529-05271-2
- Oliver Auge: Burgen in Schleswig-Holstein. Zeugen des Mittelalters.Kiel 2019. ISBN 978-3-529-05039-8
- Thorsten Lemm: Die frühmittelalterlichen Ringwälle im westlichen und mittleren Holstein. Kiel 2013. ISBN 978-3-529-01806-0
