= Hamburg Summit: China meets Europe =

Biennial high-level conference held in Hamburg, Germany

- Status: active
- Genre: international trade conference
- Frequency: bi-annually
- Locations: Hamburg, Germany
- Inaugurated: 2004
- Founder: Helmut Schmidt
- Participants: 600
- Area: People's Republic of China; European Union
- Organiser: Hamburg Chamber of Commerce
- Website: hamburg-summit.com

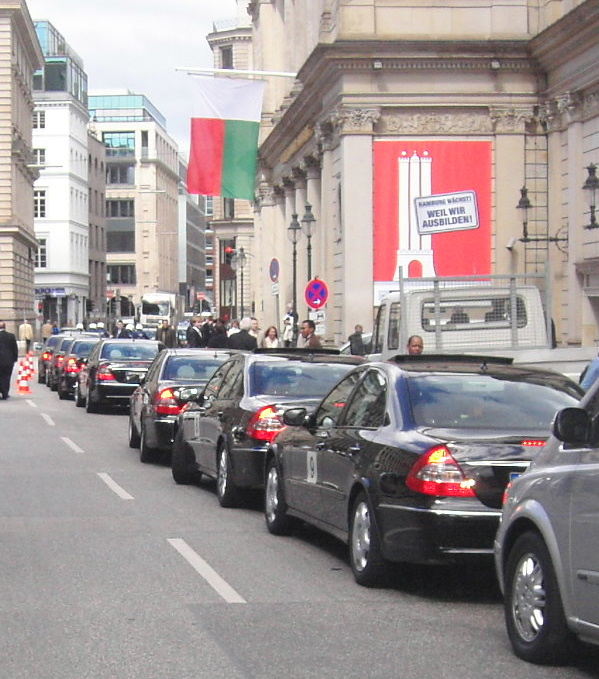
Venue of the conference: the Hamburg Chamber of Commerce

The Hamburg Summit: China meets Europe is a biennial high-level conference on Sino-European economic relations held in Hamburg. The Hamburg Chamber of Commerce initiated the first "Hamburg Summit" in 2004 to set up a platform for an open dialogue between Europe and China and to improve their economic relations.

== History ==
In discussions between the former German Chancellor Helmut Schmidt, mayors of Hamburg and the Hamburg Chamber of Commerce Commerce the idea was born to organise a conference in Hamburg to intensify the economic and political dialogue between Europe and China and improve the economic relationship. Hamburg as venue for the conference was a consequential choice because of the strong economic relations between the hanseatic city and the People's Republic of China. With more than 550 companies from China Hamburg is one of Europe's most important locations for Chinese companies. In addition to port-oriented companies (COSCO, China Shipping) Hamburg also hosts European headquarters of Chinese industrial companies (Baosteel, Sinosteel) or Shanghai Zhenhua Heavy Industries (ZPMC). With the Bank of China and the Industrial and Commercial Bank of China (ICBC), the two largest Chinese banks are also represented in Hamburg. On the other side over 700 Hamburg companies maintain business relations with China. For Northern, Central and Eastern Europe Hamburg has a central role in business with China, as Hamburg is the transit station for most of the imports from China and a distribution center for onward transport to the new EU accession countries, but also to Russia and Western and Southern Europe. Indeed, about one third of the container traffic in the port of Hamburg is related to China.

2004
In the presence of former German Chancellor Helmut Schmidt over 350 decision makers from politics, industry and academia discussed the current state of Sino-European relations during the first “Hamburg Summit”. The Chinese guest of honour was then Deputy Prime Minister Zeng Peiyan.

2006
Already at the second "Hamburg Summit" Wen Jiabao, the Prime Minister of the People's Republic of China, was present as guest of honour, who stressed the importance of the conference. Furthermore, Singapore's founding father Lee Kuan Yew, the former German chancellors Helmut Kohl and Helmut Schmidt took part.

2008
The third "Hamburg Summit" took place after the Sino-German diplomatic irritations caused by a meeting between German Chancellor Angela Merkel and the Dalai Lama in September 2007. In fall 2008 the "Hamburg Summit" was the occasion for the first visit of a senior Chinese politician in Germany after the crisis. Guests of honour in 2008 were Frank-Walter Steinmeier, then German Foreign Minister, and Vice-Chancellor, Zhang Dejiang, Deputy Prime Minister of the People's Republic of China, and then EU Commissioner László Kovács

2010
Over 400 participants attended the fourth "Hamburg Summit” which took place under the impression of the aftermath of the economic and financial crises and its impact the Sino-European economic relations. As Chinese guest of honour the “Hamburg Summit” welcomed the Secretary General of the State Council of the People's Republic of China, Ma Kai,. Additional guests of honour were the German Foreign Minister and former Vice Chancellor Dr. Guido Westerwelle, as well as the Vice President of the European Commission and Commissioner for Competition, Joaquín Almunia.

2012
The fifth “Hamburg Summit” was held from 28 to 30 November 2012 at the Hamburg Chamber of Commerce. At the opening of the fifth “Hamburg Summit: China meets Europe”, the Chinese Minister of Science Wan Gang, Germany's then Research Minister Annette Schavan and Professor Georgios Papastamkos, Vice President of the European Parliament, spoke about their views of European-Chinese economic relations. The state of the global economy, trade relations between the EU and China, the liberalisation of the Chinese currency, smart cities, safeguarding raw materials and strategies for Europe and China in a multipolar world were dealt with in six panel discussions. However, all speeches and discussions focused on the effects of the change of leadership in China and the sovereign debt crisis in Europe. The highlight for many participants was the discussion between former German Chancellor Helmut Schmidt and former US Secretary of State Dr Henry Kissinger, on the role of China, Europe and the US in the global power structure. Some 440 participants from 21 nations and 200 members of the press registered for the “Hamburg Summit” in 2012.

2014
The sixth “Hamburg Summit” took place on October 10 and 11, 2014 at the Hamburg Chamber of Commerce. As guests of honour, Li Keqiang, Prime Minister of the People's Republic of China, Xavier Bettel, Prime Minister of Luxembourg, Martin Schulz, President of the European Parliament, Dr Frank-Walter Steinmeier, Minister of Foreign Affairs of the Federal Republic of Germany, and Karel De Gucht, then EU Commissioner for Trade attended the conference. In his speech, Premier Li Keqiang stressed the importance of Europe as a partner for Chinas reform programme and gave important impulses for the bilateral cooperation between China and Europe in the future. Besides the high-ranking guests of honour, over 600 international participants attended the sixth “Hamburg Summit”.

2016
The seventh "Hamburg Summit" took place on November 23 and 24, 2016 at the Hamburg Chamber of Commerce. Liu Yandong, Vice-Premier of the State Council of the People's Republic of China, Jyrki Katainen, Vice-President of the EU-Commission and then Federal Foreign Minister Frank-Walter Steinmeier, attended the conference as guests of honour. Furthermore, 560 participants from 14 different countries attended the “Hamburg Summit” 2016.

2018
The eighth “Hamburg Summit: China meets Europe” took place on November 26 and 27, 2018 at the Hamburg Chamber of Commerce. Liu He, one of the Vice Premiers of the People's Republic of China, Margrethe Vestager, Commissioner for Competition of the European Commission, and Andreas Scheuer, Federal Minister of Transport and Digital Infrastructure, attended as guests of honour and representatives of their respective states. Additionally, high-ranking business delegations were brought by China Federation of Industrial Economic. Topics discussed at the conference included the Belt and Road Initiative, economic development, and the global geopolitical landscape.

== Content ==
The "Hamburg Summit" brings together leaders from politics, business and academics, who will discuss current issues and challenges for the Sino-European economic dialogue. Especially in times of the global economic crisis that erupted immediately after the "Hamburg Summit" in 2008 or the current sovereign debt crisis forums such as the "Hamburg Summit" are important to maintain the dialogue with China on a politically neutral level or even to intensify.

Recurring themes at the "Hamburg Summit" include the roles of China and Europe in the global economy, trade relations between China and the EU, bilateral investments between the EU and China, energy and raw material supplies, sustainability issues, and environmental protection. Discussions address not only broader theoretical questions but also practical solutions, such as "Smart City" concepts.

Two prizes are awarded as part of the “Hamburg Summit” – the China-Europe Friendship Award, which in 2014 went to the China Federation of Industrial Economics (CFIE) and in 2016 to Gerhard Schröder, former chancellor of the Federal Republic of Germany. The second award is the China-Europe Sustainability Award. The latter went in 2014 to BMW China and in 2016 to the Chint Group.

Since 2004 the Hamburg Chamber of Commerce closely cooperates with the China Federation of Industrial Economics (CFIE), which acts as co-host, bringing high-level business delegations to Hamburg. Since 2010 a close cooperation also exists with the China Association of Trade in Services (CATIS).

== Previous speakers ==
Representatives of the People's Republic of China

- 2004: Zeng Peiyan, then deputy prime minister
- 2006: Wen Jiabao, then prime minister
- 2008: Zhang Dejiang, then deputy prime minister
- 2010: Ma Kai, then secretary general of the State Council
- 2012: Wan Gang, vice-chairman of the 11th Chinese People's Political Consultative Conference, Minister of Science and Technology of the People's Republic of China
- 2014: Li Keqiang, prime minister
- 2016: Liu Yandong, vice-premier of the State Council of the People's Republic of China
- 2018: Liu He, vice-premier of the State Council of the People's Republic of China

Representatives of the European Union

- 2008: László Kovács, commissioner for tax and customs policy, European Commission
- 2010: Joaquín Almunia, vice-president of the European Commission
- 2012: Karel De Gucht, European commissioner for trade
- 2012: Dr Georgios Papastamkos, vice-president of the European Parliament
- 2012: Elmar Brok, chairman of the Foreign Affairs Committee of the European Parliament
- 2014: Martin Schulz, president, European Parliament
- 2016: Jyrki Katainen, vice-president, European Commission
- 2018: Margrethe Vestager, Commissioner for Competition of the European Commission

Representatives of the German government

- 2006: Michael Glos, then Minister of Economic Affairs
- 2008, 2014 and 2016: Dr Frank-Walter Steinmeier, then foreign minister and vice chancellor
- 2010: Dr Guido Westerwelle, foreign minister and former vice-chancellor
- 2012: Annette Schavan, then Federal Minister of Education and Research
- 2016: Kevin Rudd, former prime-minister of Australia
- 2018: Andreas Scheuer, Federal Minister of Transport and Digital Infrastructure

Representatives of other governments

- 2008: Bob Hawke, former Australian prime minister
- 2008: Anne Marie Idrac, then Minister of State to the Minister for the Economy, Industry and Employment, with responsibility for foreign trade, France
- 2008: Skeikha Lubna Al Quasimi, Foreign Trade Minister of the United Arab Emirates
- 2010: Michael Heseltine CH, former deputy British prime minister
- 2004, 2006, 2008: Lee Kuan Yew, minister mentor, Singapore (via satellite)
- 2012: Dr Henry Kissinger, former US Secretary of State and Nobel Peace Prize recipient

Business representatives

- Lutz Bethge, managing director, Montblanc International
- Dr Martin Brudermueller, vice-chairman of the board of executive directors, BASF; China spokesperson of the Asia-Pacific Committee of German Business
- Victor Chu, chairman, First Eastern Investment Group
- Dr Thomas Enders, chief executive officer, EADS
- Juergen Fitschen, co-chairman, Deutsche Bank, chairman, OAV - German Asia-Pacific Business Association
- Guo Guangchang, executive director & chairman of the board, Fosun International
- He Dongdong, vice-president, Sany Heavy Industries Co., Ltd.
- Dr Axel C. Heitmann, chairman and CEO, Lanxess* Peter Loescher, chairman, Asia-Pacific Committee of German Business, CEO, Siemens
- Hubertus Troska, board member of Daimler AG, chairman and CEO, Daimler Greater China
- Lejiang Xu, chairman, Baosteel Group Corporation
- Lu Jianzhong, president, Shanghai Zhenhua Heavy Industries Co., Ltd (ZPMC)
- Capt. Xu Lirong, director and president, China Shipping (Group) Company
- Dr Dahai Yu, board member, Evonik Industries AG
- Yang Yuanqing, CEO, Lenovo Group Ltd.
- Zhang Jianwei, executive director & president, SINOTRANS Ltd.
- Dr. Song Hailiang, vice president, China Communications Construction Company Ltd.; chairman, Shanghai Zhenhua Heavy Industries Co. Ltd.
- Li Yunpeng, director of board and president, China Ocean Shipping (Group) Company (COSCO)
- Zhang Xiaogang PhD, president, Ansteel Group Corporation; president-elect, International Organization for Standardization
- Zhou Zhongshu, chairman, Minmetals Corporation

Representatives of other institutions

- Vítor Constâncio and Lucas D. Papademos, vice-presidents of the European Central Bank
- Peter Praet, chief economist, European Central Bank
- Li Dongrong, deputy governor, People's Bank of China
- Christine Loh, chief executive officer, Civic Exchange
- Philippe Maystadt and Werner Hoyer, presidents of the European Investment Bank
- Mario Monti, president, Bocconi University, and former EU Commissioner
- Xu Kuangdi, vice chairman, 10th Political Consultative Conference of the Chinese people, chairman, China Federation of Industrial Economics (CFIE)
- Capt. Wei Jiafu, chairman, China Association of Trade in Services (CATIS), president and chief executive officer, COSCO Group
- Dr. Zhang Xuechun, chief representative, Frankfurt Representative Office, People's Bank of China
- Gilles Noblet, deputy director general, International & European Relations, European Central Bank
