= Hamburg Stock Exchange =

Stock exchange in Hamburg, Germany

Coordinates: 53.5497°N 9.9911°E

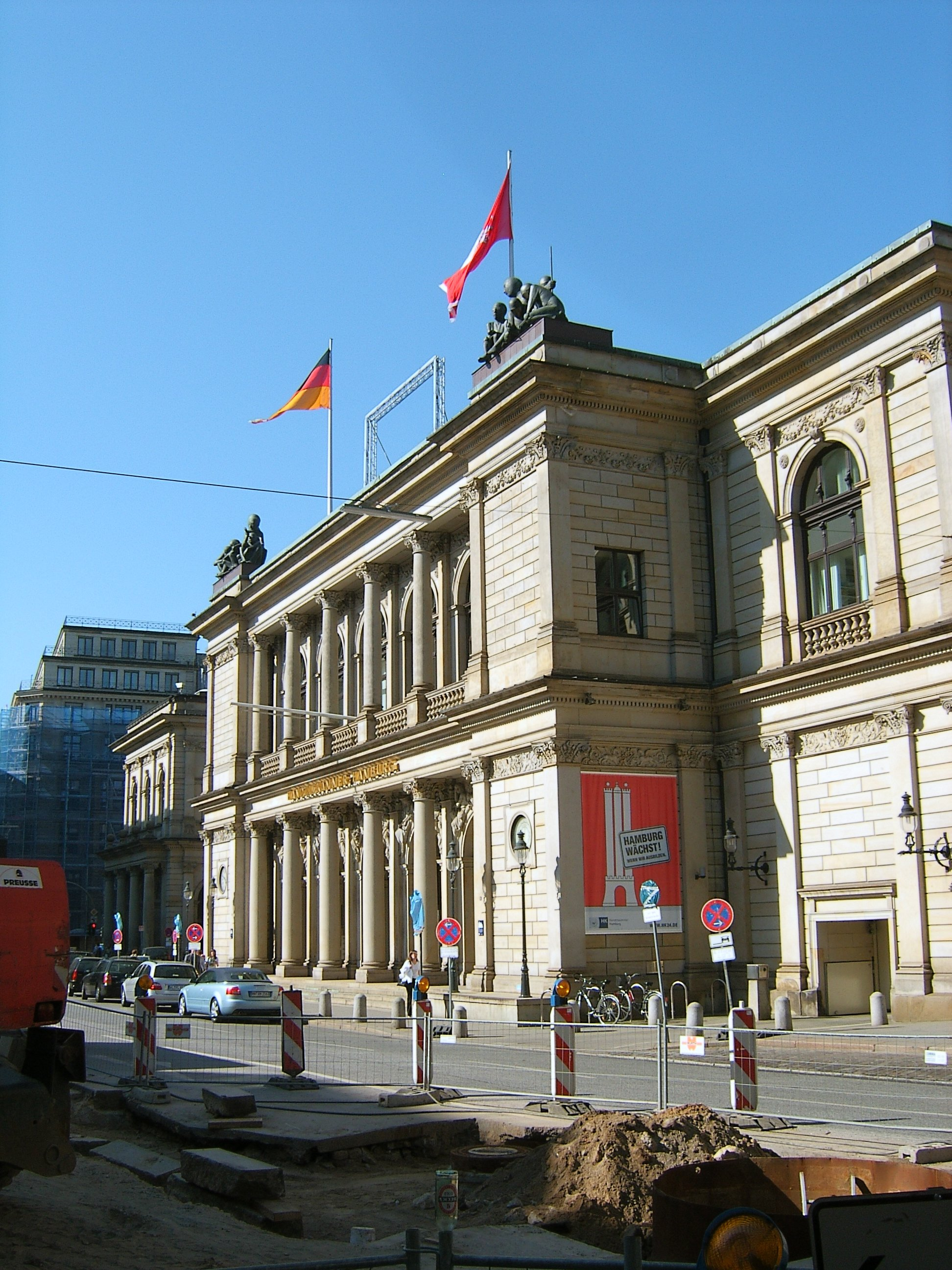
- Type: Stock exchange
- Location: Hamburg, Germany
- Founded: 1558
- Website: hamburger-boerse.de

The Hamburg Stock Exchange (German: Hamburger Börse) is the oldest stock exchange in Germany. It was founded in 1558 in the Free and Hanseatic city of Hamburg. Four different individual exchanges now exist under its umbrella: the Insurance Exchange, Grain Exchange, Coffee Exchange, along with the General Exchange.
