= C. Illies & Co. =

German engineering and trading house

- Industry: Engineering and trading
- Founded: 1859
- Headquarters: Hamburg, Germany
- Number of employees: 400

C. Illies & Co. (Illies GmbH & Co. KG) is an engineering and trading house for the export of investment goods, based in Hamburg, Germany, established in 1859.

The company is privately owned with more than 400 employees in Hamburg/Germany, Japan, China, Korea, Taiwan, United Arab Emirates, Vietnam, India, Indonesia, Russia, Kazakhstan, Uzbekistan and Italy.
