= List of mayors of Hamburg =

First Mayor of Hamburg
- Erster Bürgermeister der Freien und Hansestadt Hamburg (German)
- Coat of arms of Hamburg

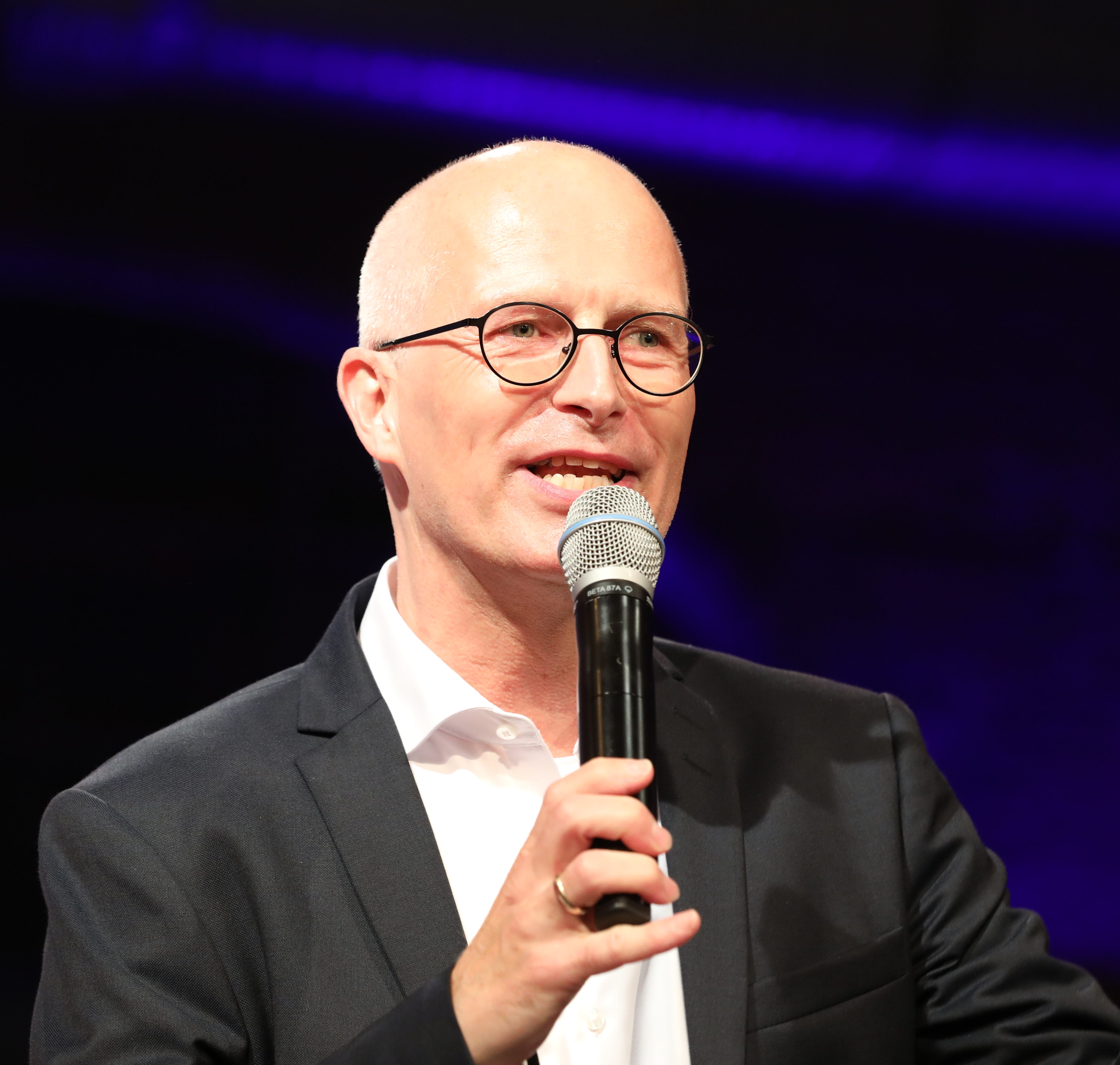
- Incumbent; Peter Tschentscher since 28 March 2018
- Type: Lord Mayor; Head of government
- Member of: Senate of Hamburg
- Appointer: Hamburg Parliament
- Term length: Pending resignation or the election of a successor
- Constituting instrument: Constitution of Hamburg
- Formation: 1293
- Deputy: Second Mayor

The following is a chronological list of mayors of Hamburg, a city-state in Germany. The mayors are the head of the city-state, part of the government of Hamburg. Since 1861, according to the constitution of 28 September 1860, the state has been governed by the ten-member Senate, which had previously been called the council (in the German language of that time: Rath). It is headed by the first mayor of Hamburg (German title: Erster Bürgermeister der Freien und Hansestadt Hamburg) as the president of the Senate. The deputy is the second mayor.

For much of its history, Hamburg was a free imperial city and later a sovereign state; the position of First Mayor historically was equivalent to that of a sovereign head of state. In the 1871–1918 German Empire, the Hamburg First Mayor was equivalent to the federal princes of the 23 German monarchies (4 of whom held the title of King and the others holding titles such as Grand Duke, Duke or Sovereign Prince). Since 1918, the position is equivalent to that of the minister-presidents of the (West) German states.

Prior to World War I, the two mayors were elected for one-year terms. Until 1997, the first mayor was primus inter pares among, and was elected by, the members of the Senate. Since then, the Hamburg Parliament (German: Hamburgische Bürgerschaft) has elected the first mayor; the first mayor is able to appoint and dismiss other senators.

== 1293–1860 ==
The function of burgomaster (mayor) was usually held simultaneously by three persons, serving as an executive college. One of the three being burgomaster in chief for a year, the second being the prior burgomaster in chief, the third being the upcoming one. Therefore, sometimes up to three names are mentioned for one year, since the names of the three appear in deeds, signed with or mentioning their names. The names in the list from 1239 until 1820 were archived in a book by Johann August Meister (1820). This is an incomplete list of burgomasters and uses the spelling in Meister's book, which is preserved in the Hamburg state library. After 1820 the list were added by hand. On 6 August 1806 Hamburg gained sovereignty as an independent country. From 1811 to 1814 Hamburg was part of France in the Bouches-de-l'Elbe.

If another reference is not noted, all mayors are taken from: Domizlaff. Das Hamburger Rathaus.

Name	Image	In office	Note
Hartwicus de Erteneborch		1293	
Werner de Metzendorp		1293	
Johann Miles		1300	
Henricus Longus		1300	
Johann, filius Oseri		1300	
Johann de Monte		1325	
Henricus de Hetfield		1325	
Nicolaus Fransoisser		1341	
Nicolaus de Monte		1341	
Hellingbernus Hetvelt		1341	
Johann Horborch		1343	
Thidericus uppen Perde		1343	
Johann Militis		1347	
Hinrich Hoop		1350	
Thidericus uppen Perde		1350	
Henricus de Monte		1356	
Henricus Hoyeri		1361	Also known as Hein Hoyer
Bertrammus Horborch		1366	
Werner de Wighersen		1367	
Ludolfus de Holdenstedte		1375	
Christian Militis		1378	Also known as Kersten Miles
Henricus (Heino) Ybing		1381	
Johannes Hoyeri		1389	
Marquard Schreye		1319	
Meinard Buxtehude		1397	
Hilmar Lopow		1401	
Johann Lüneborg		1411	
Henricus de Monte		1413	
Henricus Hoyeri		1417	
Johannes Wighe (Wye)		1420	
Bernhard Borstelt		1422	
Vicco de Hove		1431	
Simon van Utrecht		1433	
Hinrich Köting		1493	
Thidericus Lüneborg		1443	
Detlev Bremer		1447	
Henricus Lopow		1451	
Thidericus Gerlefstorp		1492	
Henricus Lesemann		1458	
Erich de Tzevena		1464	
Albert Schilling		1464	
Hinrich Murmester		1466	
Johann Meiger		1472	
Johann Huge		1478	
Nicolaus de Schworen		1480	
Hermann Langenbeck	Hermann Langenbeck	1481	
Henning Büring		1486	
Christian Berchampe		1492	
Erich von Tzeven		1499	
Detlev Bremer		1499	
Bartholomäus vom Rhyne		1505	
Marquard vam Lo		1507–1519	
Johann Spreckelsen		1512	
Nicolaus Thode		1517	
Thidericus Hohusen		1517	
unoccupied		1519–1520	Second Mayor was Dietrich [Thidericus?] Hohusen (1517–1546)
Erhard vom Holte		1520–1529	Also Gerhard vom Holte
Hinrich Salsborg		1523	
Johann Hülpe		1524	
Johann Wetken		1529–1533	
Paul Grote		1531	
Albert Westede		1533–1538	
Johann Rodenborg		1536	
Peter von Spreckelsen		1538–1553	
Jürgen Plate		1546	
Matthias Rheder		1547	
Ditmar Koel		1548	
Albert Hackmann		1553–1580	
unoccupied		1580–1581	Second Mayor was Paul Grote (1580–1584)
Lorenz Niebur		1557	
Hermann Wetken		1564	
Eberhard Moller		1571	
Paul Grote		1580	
Johann Niebur		1557	(1581–1590)
Nicolaus Vögeler		1581	
Joachim vom Kape		1588	
Diedrich von Eitzen		1589	
unoccupied		1590–1591	Second Mayor: Joachim von Kape (1588–1594)
Erich von der Fechte		1591–1613	
Joachim Bekendorp		1593	
Diederich vom Holte		1595	
Vincent Moller		1599	
Eberhard Twestreng		1606	
Hieronimus Vögeler		1609	
unoccupied		1613–1614	Second Mayor: Hieronymus Vögeler (1609–1642)
Sebastian von Bergen	Sebastian von Bergen	1614–1623	
Johann Wetken		1614	
Bartholomäus Beckmann		1617	
Joachim Clan		1622	
Albert von Eitzen		1623	
unoccupied		1623–1624	
Ulrich Winkel		1624–1649	
Johannes Brand		1633–1652	
Bartholomäus Moller		1643	
unoccupied		1649–1650	Second Mayor: Bartholomäus Moller (1643–1667)
Nicolaus Jarre		1650–1678	
Johann Schlebusch		1653	
Peter Lütkens		1654	
Wolfgang Meurer		1660	
Bartholomäus Twestreng		1663	
Johannes Schötteringk		1667	
Johann Schulte		1668	
Broderus Pauli		1670–1680	
Johann Schröder		1676	
Heinrich Meurer		1678–1684	(First term)
Diedrich Moller		1680	
Johann Schlüter	Johann Schlüter	1684–1688	
Joachim Lemmermann		1684	
Heinrich Meurer		1686	(1688–1690) Second term
Peter Lütkens		1687–1717	
Johannes Schafshausen	Johannes Schafshausen	1690–1697	
Hieronimus Harticus Moller		1697	
Peter von Lengerke (or Lengerks)		1697–1709	
Julius Surland		1702	
Gerhard Schröder	Gerhard Schröder	1703	
Paul Paulsen		1704	
Lucas von Borstel	Lucas von Borstel	1709–1716	
Ludwig Becceler		1712	
Bernhard Matfeldt		1716–1720	
Garlieb Sillem	Garlieb Sillem	1717	
Hinrich Diedrich Wiese		1720–1728	(or Heinrich Dietrich Wiese)
Hans Jacob Faber	Hans Jacob Faber	1722	
Johann Anderson	Johann Anderson	1723	
Rütger Rulant		1728–1742	
Daniel Stockfleth	Daniel Stockfleth	1729	
Martin Lucas Schele		1733	
Johann H. Luis		1739	
Cornelius Poppe		1741	
Conrad Widow	Conrad Widow	1742–1754	(1743–1754)
Nicolaus Stempeel		1743	
Clemens Samuel Lipstrop		1749	
Lucas von Spreckelsen		1750	
Martin H. Schele		1751	
Lucas Corthum		1751	
Nicolaus Schuback		1759	(1754–1783)
Peter Greve		1759	
Vincent Rumpff	Vincent Rumpff	1765	
Johann Schlüter		1774	
Albert Schulte		1778	
Frans Doormann	Frans Doorman	1780	
Jacob Albrecht von Sienen		1781	
Johann Anderson		1781	(1783–1790)
Johann Luis		1784	
Johann Adolph Poppe		1786	
Martin Dorner		1788	
Franz Anton Wagener		1790–1801	
Daniel Lienau		1798	
Peter Hinrich Widow		1800–1802	
Friedrich von Graffen		1801–1810	First term
Wilhelm Amsinck	Wilhelm Amsinck	1802	
Johann Arnold Heise	Johann Arnold Heise	1807	
Amandus Augustus Abendroth	Amandus Augustus Abendroth	1811–1813	Not included in the Meister's book.
Friedrich von Graffen		1815–1820	Second term
Christian Matthias Schröder	Christian Matthias Schröder	1816	
Johann Heinrich Bartels		1820–1850	
Johann Daniel Koch	Johann Daniel Koch	1821	
Martin Garlieb Sillem	Martin Garlieb Sillem	1829	
Amandus Augustus Abendroth	Amandus Augustus Abendroth	1831	
Martin Hieronymus Schrötteringk		1832	
Christian Daniel Benecke	Christian Daniel Benecke	1835	
Heinrich Kellinghusen	Dr. Heinrich Kellinghusen	1842	
Johann Ludwig Dammert		1843	
Nicolaus Binder	Nicolaus Binder	1855	
unoccupied		1850–1861	Second Mayor: Christian Daniel Benecke (1835–1851); Third Mayor: Heinrich Kellinghusen (1842–1880); Fourth Mayor: Nicolaus Binder (1855–1861); All:

== Hamburg (1860–1919) ==
Since 1860 Hamburg had a constitution. Members of the Hamburg senate were elected by the Hamburg Parliament—not coopted by the existing senate. They were lifelong members of the senate. From the three eldest and juristic trained members the senate elected annually the First Mayor of Hamburg (German title: Erster Bürgermeister der Freien und Hansestadt Hamburg) – the presiding head – and his deputy (Second Mayor of the Free and Hanseatic city of Hamburg, German title: Zweiter Bürgermeister der Freien und Hansestadt Hamburg).

Description of the method

Year	First mayor	Second mayor	„sabbatical year"
1	Senator A	Senator B	Senator C
2	Senator B	Senator C	Senator A
3	Senator C	Senator A	Senator B
4	Senator A	Senator B	Senator C

All mayors are taken from Domizlaff: Das Hamburger Rathaus and are listed in Erste Bürgermeister Hamburgs 1507–2008, only changes in dates are marked by an added reference.

Name	Image	In office	Note
Friedrich Sieveking	Friedrich Sieveking	1861–1862	
Ferdinand Haller	Gustav Heinrich Kirchenpauer	1863–1864	
Friedrich Sieveking	Friedrich Sieveking	1865	
Ferdinand Haller	Gustav Heinrich Kirchenpauer	1866–1867	(−1868)
Friedrich Sieveking	Friedrich Sieveking	1868	
Gustav Heinrich Kirchenpauer	Gustav Heinrich Kirchenpauer	1869	
Ferdinand Haller	Gustav Heinrich Kirchenpauer	1870	

== German Reich (1871–1945) ==
=== German Empire (1871–1918) ===
Portrait	Name (Born–Died)	Term of office			Political party
Portrait	Name (Born–Died)	Took office	Left office	Days	Political party
German Empire (1871–1918)
City of the German Reich
Gustav Heinrich Kirchenpauer	Gustav Heinrich Kirchenpauer (1808–1887)	1 January 1871	31 December 1872	730	
Gustav Heinrich Kirchenpauer	Ferdinand Haller (1805–1876)	1 January 1873	31 December 1873	364	
Hermann Gossler	Hermann Goßler (1802–1877)	1 January 1874	31 December 1874	364	
Gustav Heinrich Kirchenpauer	Gustav Heinrich Kirchenpauer (1808–1887)	1 January 1875	31 December 1875	364	
Carl Petersen	Carl Friedrich Petersen (1809–1892)	1 January 1876	31 December 1877	730	
Gustav Heinrich Kirchenpauer	Gustav Heinrich Kirchenpauer (1808–1887)	1 January 1878	31 December 1878	364	
Hermann Weber	Hermann Weber (1822–1886)	1 January 1879	31 December 1879	729	
Carl Petersen	Carl Friedrich Petersen (1809–1892)	1 January 1880	31 December 1880	365	
Gustav Heinrich Kirchenpauer	Gustav Heinrich Kirchenpauer (1808–1887)	1 January 1881	31 December 1881	364	
Hermann Weber	Hermann Weber (1822–1886)	1 January 1882	31 December 1882	364	
Carl Petersen	Carl Friedrich Petersen (1809–1892)	1 January 1883	31 December 1883	364	
Gustav Heinrich Kirchenpauer	Gustav Heinrich Kirchenpauer (1808–1887)	1 January 1884	31 December 1884	365	
Hermann Weber	Hermann Weber (1822–1886)	1 January 1885	31 December 1885	364	
Carl Petersen	Carl Friedrich Petersen (1809–1892)	1 January 1886	31 December 1886	364	
Gustav Heinrich Kirchenpauer	Gustav Heinrich Kirchenpauer (1808–1887)	1 January 1887	3 March 1887	61	
Johannes Versmann	Johannes Versmann (1820–1899)	14 March 1887	31 December 1888	658	
Carl Petersen	Carl Friedrich Petersen (1809–1892)	1 January 1889	31 December 1889	364	
Johann Georg Mönckeberg	Johann Georg Mönckeberg (1839–1908)	1 January 1890	31 December 1890	364	
Johannes Versmann	Johannes Versmann (1820–1899)	1 January 1891	31 December 1891	364	
Carl Petersen	Carl Friedrich Petersen (1809–1892)	1 January 1892	31 December 1892	365	
Johann Georg Mönckeberg	Johann Georg Mönckeberg (1839–1908)	1 January 1893	31 December 1893	364	
Johannes Versmann	Johannes Versmann (1820–1899)	1 January 1894	31 December 1894	364	
	Johannes Lehmann (1826–1901)	1 January 1895	31 December 1895	364	
Johann Georg Mönckeberg	Johann Georg Mönckeberg (1839–1908)	1 January 1896	31 December 1896	365	
Johannes Versmann	Johannes Versmann (1820–1899)	1 January 1897	31 December 1897	364	
	Johannes Lehmann (1826–1901)	1 January 1898	31 December 1898	364	
Johann Georg Mönckeberg	Johann Georg Mönckeberg (1839–1908)	1 January 1899	31 December 1899	364	
	Johannes Lehmann (1826–1901)	1 January 1900	15 September 1900	257	
Gerhard Hachmann 1904	Gerhard Hachmann (1838–1904)	19 November 1900	31 December 1901	407	
Johann Georg Mönckeberg	Johann Georg Mönckeberg (1839–1908)	1 January 1902	31 December 1902	364	
Johann Heinrich Burchard 1905	Johann Heinrich Burchard (1852–1912)	1 January 1903	31 December 1903	364	
Gerhard Hachmann 1904	Gerhard Hachmann (1838–1904)	1 January 1904	5 July 1904	186	
Johann Georg Mönckeberg	Johann Georg Mönckeberg (1839–1908)	5 July 1904	31 December 1905	544	
Johann Heinrich Burchard 1905	Johann Heinrich Burchard (1852–1912)	1 January 1906	31 December 1906	364	
Johann Stammann 1905	Johann Otto Stammann (1835–1909)	1 January 1907	31 December 1907	364	
Johann Georg Mönckeberg	Johann Georg Mönckeberg (1839–1908)	1 January 1908	27 March 1908	365	
Johann Heinrich Burchard 1905	Johann Heinrich Burchard (1852–1912)	3 April 1908	31 December 1909	637	
Max Predöhl 1905	Max Predöhl (1854–1923)	1 January 1910	31 December 1911	729	
Johann Heinrich Burchard 1905	Johann Heinrich Burchard; 1852–1912)	1 January 1912	6 September 1912	249	
August Schröder 1905	Carl August Schröder (1855–1945)	3 September 1912	31 December 1913	484	
Max Predöhl 1905	Max Predöhl (1854–1923)	1 January 1914	31 December 1914	364	
Werner von Melle 1905	Werner von Melle (1853–1937)	1 January 1915	31 December 1915	364	
August Schröder 1905	Carl August Schröder (1855–1945)	1 January 1916	31 December 1916	365	
Max Predöhl 1905	Max Predöhl (1854–1923)	1 January 1917	31 December 1917	364	
Werner von Melle 1905	Werner von Melle (1853–1937)	1 January 1918	12 November 1918	315	

List of Second Mayors from 1860 to 1919
Name	Image	In office	Note
Ascan Wilhelm Lutteroth	Ascan Wilhelm Lutteroth	1862–1863	
Friedrich Sieveking	Friedrich Sieveking	1864	
Ascan Wilhelm Lutteroth Legat	Ascan Wilhelm Lutteroth	1865–1866	
Friedrich Sieveking	Friedrich Sieveking	1867	
Gustav Heinrich Kirchenpauer	Gustav Heinrich Kirchenpauer	1868	
Ferdinand Haller	Gustav Heinrich Kirchenpauer	1869	
Hermann Goßler	Hermann Gossler	1870–1871	
Ferdinand Haller	Gustav Heinrich Kirchenpauer	1872	
Hermann Goßler	Hermann Gossler	1873	
Gustav Heinrich Kirchenpauer	Gustav Heinrich Kirchenpauer	1874	
Ferdinand Haller	Gustav Heinrich Kirchenpauer	1875	
Hermann Weber	Hermann Weber	1876	
Gustav Heinrich Kirchenpauer	Gustav Heinrich Kirchenpauer	1877	
Hermann Weber	Hermann Weber	1878	
Carl Friedrich Petersen	Gustav Heinrich Kirchenpauer	1879	
Gustav Heinrich Kirchenpauer	Gustav Heinrich Kirchenpauer	1880	
Hermann Weber	Hermann Weber	1881	
Carl Friedrich Petersen	Gustav Heinrich Kirchenpauer	1882	
Gustav Heinrich Kirchenpauer	Gustav Heinrich Kirchenpauer	1883	
Hermann Weber	Hermann Weber	1884	
Carl Friedrich Petersen	Gustav Heinrich Kirchenpauer	1885	
Gustav Heinrich Kirchenpauer	Gustav Heinrich Kirchenpauer	1886	
Johannes Versmann	Johannes Versmann	1 January 1887 – 14 March 1887	
Max Theodor Hayn		14 March 1887 – 31 December 1887	
Carl Friedrich Petersen	Gustav Heinrich Kirchenpauer	1888	
Johann Georg Mönckeberg	Johann Georg Mönckeberg	1889	
Johannes Versmann	Johannes Versmann	1890	
Carl Friedrich Petersen	Gustav Heinrich Kirchenpauer	1891	
Johann Georg Mönckeberg	Johann Georg Mönckeberg	1892	
Johannes Versmann	Johannes Versmann	1893	
Johannes Lehmann		1894	
Johann Georg Mönckeberg	Johann Georg Mönckeberg	1895	
Johannes Versmann	Johannes Versmann	1896	
Johannes Lehmann		1897	
Johann Georg Mönckeberg	Johann Georg Mönckeberg	1898	
Johannes Versmann	Johannes Versmann	1899	
Johannes Lehmann		5 July 1899 – 31 December 1899	
Gerhard Hachmann	Gerhard Hachmann 1904	1 January 1900 – 19 November 1900	
Johann Georg Mönckeberg	Johann Georg Mönckeberg	19 November 1900 – 1901	
Johann Heinrich Burchard	Johann Heinrich Burchard 1905	1902	
Gerhard Hachmann	Gerhard Hachmann 1904	1903	
Johann Georg Mönckeberg	Johann Georg Mönckeberg	1 January 1904 – 11 July 1904	
Johann Heinrich Burchard	Johann Heinrich Burchard 1905	11 July 1904 – 1905	
Johann Otto Stammann	Johann Stammann 1905	1906	
Johann Georg Mönckeberg	Johann Georg Mönckeberg	1907	
Johann Heinrich Burchard	Johann Heinrich Burchard 1905	1 January 1908 – 3 April 1908	
William Henry O'Swald	William O'Swald 1905	3 April 1908 – 1909	
Carl August Schröder	August Schröder 1905	1910	
Johann Heinrich Burchard	Johann Heinrich Burchard 1905	1911	
Carl August Schröder	August Schröder 1905	1 January 1912 – 13 September 1912	
Max Predöhl	Max Predöhl 1905	13 September 1912 – 1913	
Werner von Melle	Werner von Melle 1905	1914	
Carl August Schröder	August Schröder 1905	1915	
Max Predöhl	Max Predöhl 1905	1916	
Werner von Melle	Werner von Melle 1905	1917	
Carl August Schröder	August Schröder 1905	1918–1919	

=== Weimar Republic (1919–1933) ===
During the German Revolution of 1918–1919 an Arbeiter- und Soldatenrat (workers' and soldiers' council) was formed. From 12 November 1918 to 1919, a chairman was the head of state and city government: Heinrich Lauffenberg (−1919), Carl Hense (1919). This is not mentioned in Domizlaff: Das Hamburger Rathaus. The period in Germany after the First World War until the takeover of power – by the Nazi Party in 1933 – is called Weimar Republic. The Hamburg Parliament was democratically elected.

First Mayor of Hamburg

Portrait	Name (Born–Died)	Term of office			Political party
Portrait	Name (Born–Died)	Took office	Left office	Days	Political party
Werner von Melle 1905	Werner von Melle (1853–1937)	31 March 1919	31 December 1919	275	
Friedrich Sthamer 1905	Friedrich Sthamer (1856–1931)	1 January 1920	1 February 1920	31	
Arnold Diestel 1905	Arnold Diestel (1857–1924)	2 February 1920	31 December 1923	1428	German Democratic Party
Carl Wilhelm Petersen 1920	Carl Wilhelm Petersen (1868–1933)	1 January 1924	31 December 1929	2191	German Democratic Party
Rudolf Roß 1932	Rudolf Ross (1872–1951)	1 January 1930	31 December 1931	729	Social Democratic Party
Carl Wilhelm Petersen 1920	Carl Wilhelm Petersen (1868–1933)	1 January 1932	30 January 1933	760	German Democratic Party

Second Mayor of Hamburg

	Party	Took office	Left office
Otto Stolten	SPD	31 March 1919	1925
Max Schramm	SPD	1925	4 April 1928
Rudolf Ross	SPD	5 April 1928	31 December 1929
Carl Wilhelm Petersen	DDP	1 January 1930	31 December 1931
Rudolf Ross	SPD	1 January 1932	30 January 1933

=== Nazi Germany (1933–1945) ===
In Nazi Germany the "Law on the Reconstruction of the Reich" (Gesetz über den Neuaufbau des Reiches) of 30 January 1934 abandoned the concept of a federal republic. The political institutions of the Länder were abolished altogether, passing all powers to the central government. The Hamburg Parliament was dissolved. The First Mayor was appointed by the Reich Interior Minister, though Hitler himself reserved the right to appoint him (as was also the case with Berlin and Vienna). The actual head of the Hamburg executive was the Reichsstatthalter (Regional Governor) Karl Kaufmann (1933–1945).

Name	Took office	Left office	Party
Carl Wilhelm Petersen	30 January 1933	7 March 1933	German People’s Party
Carl Vincent Krogmann	8 March 1933	3 May 1945	NSDAP

Second Mayor

Name	Took office	Left office	Party
Rudolf Ross	30 January 1933	3 March 1933	Social Democratic Party
Wilhelm Burchard-Motz	8 March 1933	18 May 1933	German People's Party

Colonel Robert Gordon Kitchen VI, Governor of Hamburg during the control of the British Army 1945–1946.

== Hamburg (1945–present) ==
Mayors during the federal parliamentary republic of Germany.

Political party key: SPD CDU

First Mayor of Hamburg
Portrait	Name (Born–Died)	Term of office			Political party	Senate
Portrait	Name (Born–Died)	Took office	Left office	Days	Political party	Senate
1	Max Brauer (1887–1973); 1st term	22 November 1946	2 December 1953 replaced by a constructive vote of no confidence	7 years, 10 days	SPD	I II
2	Kurt Sieveking (1897–1986)	2 December 1953	4 December 1957	4 years, 2 days	CDU	I
3	Max Brauer (1887–1973); 2nd term	4 December 1957	31 December 1960 resigned	3 years, 27 days	SPD	III
4	Paul Nevermann (1902–1979)	1 January 1961	9 June 1965 resigned	4 years, 159 days	SPD	I II
5	Herbert Weichmann (1896–1983)	9 June 1965	9 June 1971 resigned	6 years, 0 days	SPD	I II III
6	Peter Schulz (1930–2013)	9 June 1971	12 November 1974	3 years, 156 days	SPD	I II
7	Hans-Ulrich Klose (1937–2023)	12 November 1974	24 June 1981 resigned	6 years, 224 days	SPD	I II
8	Klaus von Dohnanyi (born 1928)	24 June 1981	8 June 1988	6 years, 350 days	SPD	I II III IV
9	Henning Voscherau (1941–2016)	8 June 1988	12 November 1997	9 years, 157 days	SPD	I II III
10	Ortwin Runde (born 1944)	12 November 1997	31 October 2001	3 years, 353 days	SPD	I
11	Ole von Beust (born 1955)	31 October 2001	25 August 2010 resigned	8 years, 298 days	CDU	I II III
12	Christoph Ahlhaus (born 1969)	25 August 2010	7 March 2011	194 days	CDU	I
13	Olaf Scholz (born 1958)	7 March 2011	13 March 2018 resigned	7 years, 6 days	SPD	I II
Second Mayor Katharina Fegebank (Alliance 90/The Greens) served as acting First Mayor from 13 March to 28 March 2018.
14	Peter Tschentscher (born 1966)	28 March 2018	Incumbent	8 years, 178 days	SPD	I II III

Second Mayor of Hamburg
Name	Took office	Left office	Party
Adolph Schönfelder (1875–1966)	6 June 1945	15 November 1946	Social Democratic Party
Christian Koch (1878–1955)	19 November 1946	18 February 1950	Free Democratic Party
Paul Nevermann (1902–1979)	24 February 1950	2 December 1953	Social Democratic Party
Edgar Engelhard (1917–1979)	2 December 1953	27 April 1966	Free Democratic Party
Wilhelm Drexelius (1906–1974)	27 April 1966	2 April 1970	Social Democratic Party
Peter Schulz (1930–2013)	22 April 1970	9 June 1971	Social Democratic Party
Helmuth Kern (1926–2016)	9 June 1971	3 October 1972	Social Democratic Party
Hans Rau (1925–1995)	3 October 1972	30 April 1974	Free Democratic Party
Dieter Biallas (1936–2016)	30 April 1974	28 June 1978	Free Democratic Party
Helga Elstner (1924–2012)	28 June 1978	13 June 1984	Social Democratic Party
Alfons Pawelczyk (1933–2026)	13 June 1984	2 September 1987	Social Democratic Party
Ingo von Münch (born 1932)	2 September 1987	26 June 1991	Free Democratic Party
Hans-Jürgen Krupp (1933–2024)	26 June 1991	1 December 1993	Social Democratic Party
Erhard Rittershaus (1931–2006)	15 December 1993	12 November 1997	Statt party
Krista Sager (born 1953)	12 November 1997	31 October 2001	Alliance '90/The Greens
Ronald Schill (born 1958)	31 October 2001	19 August 2003	Party for a Rule of Law Offensive
Mario Mettbach (1952–2022)	21 August 2003	17 March 2004	Party for a Rule of Law Offensive
Birgit Schnieber-Jastram (born 1946)	17 March 2004	7 May 2008	Christian Democratic Union
Christa Goetsch (born 1952)	7 May 2008	29 November 2010	Alliance '90/The Greens
Dietrich Wersich (born 1964)	30 November 2010	7 March 2011	Christian Democratic Union
Dorothee Stapelfeldt (born 1956)	7 March 2011	15 April 2015	Social Democratic Party
Katharina Fegebank (born 1977)	15 April 2015	Incumbent	Alliance '90/The Greens

== Notes and references ==
General

- (1293–1977) Domizlaff, Svante (2002). Das Hamburger Rathaus (in German) (first ed.). Hamburg: Edition Maritim. ISBN 978-3-89225-465-2. (Note: not included in the 2nd edition.)
