= Gustav Heinrich Kirchenpauer =

German jurist, journalist and natural history researcher

Gustav Kirchenpauer
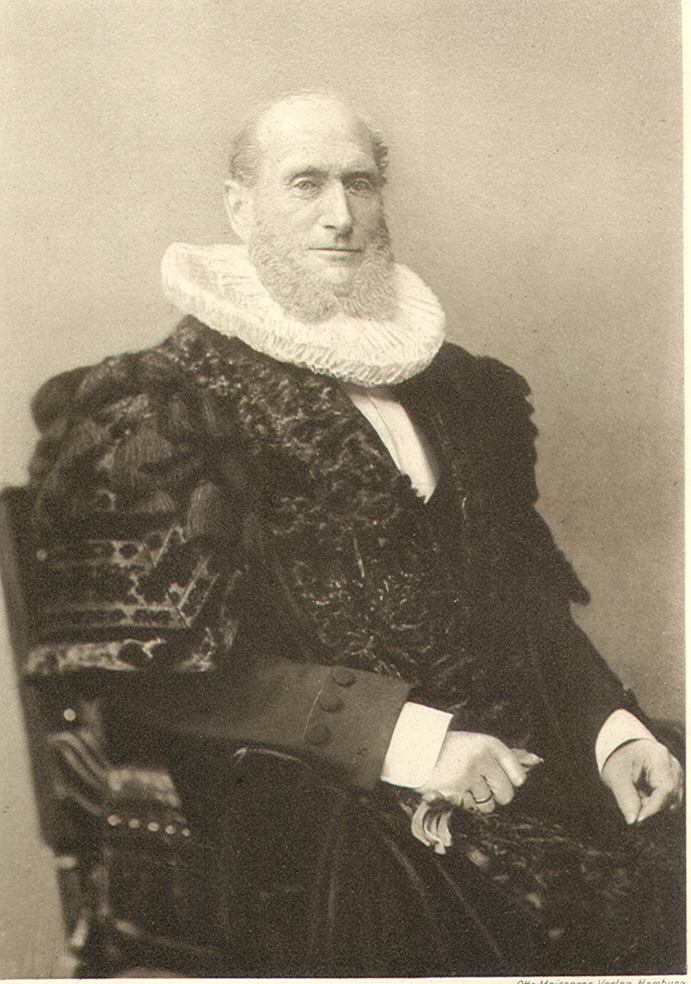
- Gustav Kirchenpauer in Hamburg senator's ornate

Second Mayor of Hamburg
- In office 1 January 1868 – 31 December 1868
- Preceded by: Friedrich Sieveking
- Succeeded by: Ferdinand Haller
- In office 1 January 1874 – 31 December 1874
- Preceded by: Hermann Gossler
- Succeeded by: Ferdinand Haller
- In office 1 January 1877 – 31 December 1877
- Preceded by: Hermann Weber
- Succeeded by: Hermann Weber
- In office 1 January 1880 – 31 December 1880
- Preceded by: Carl Petersen
- Succeeded by: Hermann Weber
- In office 1 January 1883 – 31 December 1883
- Preceded by: Carl Petersen
- Succeeded by: Hermann Weber
- In office 1 January 1886 – 31 December 1886
- Preceded by: Carl Petersen
- Succeeded by: Johannes Versmann

First Mayor of Hamburg and President of the Hamburg Senate
- In office 1 January 1869 – 31 December 1869
- Preceded by: Friedrich Sieveking
- Succeeded by: Ferdinand Haller
- In office 1 January 1871 – 31 December 1872
- Preceded by: Ferdinand Haller
- Succeeded by: Ferdinand Haller
- In office 1 January 1875 – 31 December 1875
- Preceded by: Hermann Gossler
- Succeeded by: Carl Petersen
- In office 1 January 1878 – 31 December 1878
- Preceded by: Carl Petersen
- Succeeded by: Hermann Weber
- In office 1 January 1881 – 31 December 1881
- Preceded by: Carl Petersen
- Succeeded by: Hermann Weber
- In office 1 January 1884 – 31 December 1884
- Preceded by: Carl Petersen
- Succeeded by: Hermann Weber
- In office 1 January 1887 – 3 March 1887
- Preceded by: Carl Petersen
- Succeeded by: Johannes Versmann

Personal details
- Born: 2 February 1808 Hamburg, French Empire
- Died: 3 March 1887 (aged 79) Hamburg, Germany
- Party: Nonpartisan
- Spouse: Juliane Dorothea Krause (1819–1905)
- Children: 3
- Parent(s): Johann Georg Kirchenpauer (1773–1844); Anna Katharina Ruesz (1778–1811)
- Education: Dorpat, Ruperto-Carola
- Occupation: Lawyer; Journalist; Hamburg Politician and Mayor

Gustav Heinrich Kirchenpauer (2 February 1808 – 3 March 1887) was a jurist, journalist and natural history researcher. His zoological publications are considered to be a significant contribution to knowledge of hydroids and bryozoans.

Kirchenpauer also contributed very considerably to the political and economic progress of his home city: between 1869 and 1887 he served seven times as the Mayor of Hamburg.

== Life ==
=== Provenance ===
Gustav Kirchenpauer descended from the "Kirchenpauer von Kirchdorff" couple, originally from Bohemia, who had been ennobled in 1539, their son, Hans Kirchenpauer von Kirchdorf having been raised further in the hierarchy of the nobility in 1590. Hans Kirchenpauer von Kirchdorff (1613–1648) came to Hamburg as a merchant, being granted citizenship of the city at the height of the Thirty Years' War, in 1640, which meant renouncing his aristocratic title.

Gustav Kirchenpauer's own parents were the merchant Johann Georg Kirchenpauer (1773–1844) and his wife, born Anna Katharina Ruesz (1778–1811), the daughter of another merchant, Barthold Heinrich Ruesz (1728–1811). Kirchenpauer's paternal grandfather, Johann David Kirchenpauer (1736–1798), was a merchant based for many years in Arkhangelsk.

=== Early years ===
After 1806 Gustav Kirchenpauer's father faced ruin on account of the Napoleonic trade restrictions known as the Continental System, the city having fallen under French control earlier that year. The family therefore left Hamburg in 1810, moving to Saint Petersburg in 1810. Unfortunately the boy's mother died the same year: two of his brothers had also died in infancy. Kirchenpauer and his two remaining brothers were sent to live with Jacob von Krause who was married to their father's sister, Julia (and thereby, by marriage, the Kirchenpauer boys' uncle). The extended family fled to London during the Autumn of 1812 to avoid the French invasion, but were able to return the next summer. The three brothers stayed on with their otherwise childless aunt and uncle in Saint Petersburg, where they grew up while their own father pursued his itinerant mercantile career.

Gustav attended a German school in Saint Petersburg, being sent on in 1823 to a German speaking secondary school (Gymnasium) at Dorpat, a university city in Livonia celebrated as a centre of learning. In 1826 he transferred to the city's university where he studied jurisprudence and civil law, also joining the student fraternity. In 1830 Kirchenpauer switched to Heidelberg where he completed his studies by receiving a qualification as a doctor in law on 5 August 1831. Heidelberg was a popular university with the merchant families of Hamburg and afforded excellent opportunities for networking. He developed a particular friendship with Carl Friedrich Petersen, a fellow law student from Hamburg whose later career in city politics would in some respects mirror Kirchepauer's own.

=== Hamburg ===
In 1832 Kirchenpauer received Hamburg citizenship which was a prerequisite for working in the city as a lawyer. On 9 July 1832 he was authorised as a Hamburg lawyer, continuing to be listed as such till 1843. In parallel with his legal work, he worked as a journalist. His name appeared on numerous opinion pieces: he was a committed advocate of Free trade, a subject much in the news at the time. Many of his contributions appeared in "Hamburgische Zeitschrift für Politik, Handel und Handelsrecht", a newspaper focused on commerce, politics and legal matters.

In 1839 he joined with the historian and city archivist Johann Martin Lappenberg (and others) to create the Verein für Hamburgische Geschichte, taking on the presidency of the economic history section of it. He had become armigerous in 1833 and in 1839 became a member of the Hamburg College of Arms. In 1837 he was elected as a captain in the Civic Militia, which entitled him to participate in council panels.

=== Civic responsibilities ===
In 1840 Kirchenpauer represented Hamburg in negotiations over the construction of what became the Hanover–Hamburg railway. Because of his free trade stance, in February 1840 he was made librarian and, simultaneously, secretary of the Hamburg Commercial Deputation (forerunner of the city's Chamber of Commerce). Following the Great Fire of 1842 Kirchenpauer was credited with having saved the new Hamburg Stock Exchange building, which also contained the Commercial Deputation´s offices. Directly afterwards, he became one of the most active members of the Commission for Reconstruction. During 1842 he was also elected chairman of the Patriotic Society, producing several memoranda recommending improvements to the efficiency of its governance. On 4 December 1843, at the remarkably young age of 35, he was elected a member of the city senate.

=== Senator ===
The senate mandated him to represent the city in renegotiations covering the important Elbe Shipping Commission, intended to update an act originally dated 21 June 1821. The act was in urgent need of modification due to changed usages and the widespread acceptance that tolls on shipping both inhibited economic growth and ran counter to the increasingly mainstream free trade principals of the time. The renegotiations resulted in the so-called "Additional Act" ("Additionalakte") of 13 April 1844 which partly replaced and partly extended the previous provisions, but at this stage some tolls for shipping remained in place.

In 1849 he was a member of the "Nine man Commission" ("Neuner-Kommission") created by the senate in response to the revolutionaries' demands arising out of the disturbances of the previous year. Its purpose was to examine the draft proposals presented by the quasi-parliamentary Hamburg Constitutional (assembly). (Hamburg finally got its new constitution in 1860.)

From 1849 he was travelling more, initially in connection with negotiations to try to get rid of the shipping tolls on the Elbe. Between 1851 and 1857 Kirchenpauer combined his senatorial responsibilities with service as a Permanent Representative of the city of Hamburg at the Federal Convention of the German Confederation.

=== Ritzebüttel and science ===
In 1858 Kirchenpauer was appointed, at his own request, the senatorial magistrate at Ritzebüttel, the coastal fort a couple of hours downstream from Hamburg. The fort marks the strategically vital point at which the Elbe meets the North Sea, He retained the office till 29 August 1864. On the administrative front he undertook the separation between justice and administration there.

"... findet ein blindes Huhn: auch wol einmal ein Korn"
"... even a blind hen can sometimes find a grain."

Gustav Kirchenpauer downplaying his scientific contribution

Kirchenpauer was the last Hamburg senatorial magistrate at Ritzebüttel. After 1864 the duties were undertaken by an official.

The appointment also allowed him the opportunity to pursue his passion for natural science: he devoted much time to studying under a microscope the life forms clinging to the buoys at the mouth of the estuary. Kirchenpauer continued with these studies after returning to Hamburg in 1864: between 1862 and 1884 he would publish six papers on hydroids, describing eight new nominal genera and seventy-seven new nominal hydroid species.

In 1873 when the Geographic Society in Hamburg was founded, Kirchenpauer was appointed the first president.

The output of this self-taught scientist caught the attention of the academic establishment and on 7 April 1875 he found himself inducted into the Leopoldina Academy of Sciences (" Sacri Romani Imperii Academia Caesarea Leopoldino-Carolina Naturae Curiosorum"), remaining a member till his death in 1887. An honorary doctorate from Kiel University followed. He would bequeath his own natural history collection to the Hamburg Natural History Museum.

=== Prussia ===
Prussian victory in the war of 1866 transformed the power relationships across Northern Germany, where the old German Confederation gave way to the North German Confederation. Within the northern region the ensuing four years saw the painful but rapid surrender of powers from the former constituent states to Berlin. Kirchenpauer was mandated in 1867 to represent Hamburg in the Reichstag (legislative assembly) of the North German Confederation. Following the completion on unification in 1871, he became Hamburg's representative in the Bundesrat, the (nominally) upper house in Germany's bicameral legislature, retaining this mandate till April 1880 when he was succeeded by Johannes Versmann.

=== Mayor ===
In 1868 Gustav Kirchenpauer was elected junior mayor of Hamburg. Mayoral terms lasted only a year, but the next year he served as the city's senior mayor: between 1869 and 1887 he served in total seven times as the junior or senior Mayor of Hamburg. Coupled with his position as Hamburg's representative in the Bundesrat, this meant that he oversaw the interminable negotiations that accompanied the unification process. His focus was on the preservation of local sovereignty within the new German state. He was deeply mistrustful of the German Chancellor, Otto von Bismarck and his intentions. For his part, Bismarck had never been a man to disclose his negotiating intentions to anyone, but the nature of the German state that emerged after 1870 suggests that he never had any plans to create a relentlessly centralising state structure along the Anglo-French model. Bismarck in negotiation was usually content to be flexible over detail, but ruthlessly uncompromising on what he saw as key principals. One matter over which there could be no compromise involved the currency. Back in 1619, taking inspiration from Amsterdam and Venice, Hamburg had been the first state in the German region to introduce a clearing bank structure, and the Hamburg senators, led by Kirchenpauer, saw the city's silver-based Hamburg mark, subdivided into sixteen shillings, in turn subdivided into twelve pence, as key to the city's centuries of commercial success and prosperity. The senators repeatedly found reasons to postpone substituting the gold-based German gold mark, which they feared would deal a fatal blow to Hamburg's sovereignty. Eventually the city's own chamber of commerce proposed a compromise deal which the central government accepted, and which effectively increased the value of the silver-based Hamburg mark at the time of the changeover. The new mark was introduced on 15 February 1873 and the so-called "silver accounts" containing the old money were closed. After 1 January 1875 in Hamburg, as in the rest of the country, the gold mark became the only legal currency within Germany. Given the political reality of German unification Hamburg would have had no option other than to accept the single German currency, but along the way the senate ensured a good price for their acceptance.

Another contentious issue involved the German customs union which traditionally had excluded the Hanseatic cities such as Hamburg whose wealth was based on international trade. At the time of unification back in 1871 exclusion from the 1833-founded German customs union was of little consequence since the Chancellor Bismarck was committed to free trade. However, the expansion and speeding up of rail transport and shipping saw European agriculture coming under price pressure from continents where land and labour were relatively abundant and inexpensive. One effect of the agricultural depression that struck Europe in the 1870s was a return to protectionism across much of Europe, and Bismarck, himself a member of the landed class, came under pressure from the owners of the vast farming estates in the east of the country to impose tariffs on imports of agricultural produce. Bismarck saw a chance to diminish Hamburg's irritating autonomy, and some members of Hamburg's business community began to be persuaded of the need to join the German customs union, albeit without sacrificing the "freeport" status on which commercial life depended. On 21 May 1879 the Hamburg senate received a disarmingly bland note from Bismarck, enquiring when they intended to accede to the customs union: the Hamburg senate discussed and procrastinated. Sovereignty was at stake. Suddenly, however, on 21 April 1880 Bismarck changed tack, applying to the German Bundesrat for the port city of Altona to be incorporated into the customs union. Traditionally Altona was a separate rival municipality, downstream along the Elbe from Hamburg, but by this time he two conurbations had become contiguous, meaning that Bismarck's application implicitly threatened to place a massively disruptive frontier through the middle of what the business community regarded as a single urban entity. Kirchenpauer was so enraged by Bismarck's tactic that he resigned from the Bundesrat within 24 hours, and negotiation with the central government of the entire matter was taken on by his successor as the Hamburg representative, Johannes Versmann. Versmann proved a little more pragmatic than Kirchenpauer, and eventually, on 25 May 1881, a "package deal" was concluded which provided both for an enlarged freeport area and Hamburg's entry into the German customs union. There had been compromises on both sides, but in the eyes of many, Hamburg's economic clout had combined with the stubborn intransigence of her senators to leave the city with a privileged status in the rapidly industrialising new Germany.

Kirchenpauer had been chairman of Hamburg's Schools and professional training board since 1869, and after 1880 he took a step back from his habitual role as the senate's expert on trade and commerce, concentrating instead on transforming the city's public education provision. His contribution was recognised when the Kirchenpauer-Gymnasium (secondary school) was named after him in 1914 (though it was replaced and renamed again in 1986). He also played a leading role in the creation of a precursor to the current University of Hamburg.

Gustav Kirchenpauer was seated at his desk in the mayoral office on 3 March 1887 when he died. His body was buried in the Ohlsdorf Cemetery.

== Family matters ==
In 1844 Gustav Kirchenpauer married Juliane Dorothea Krause (1819–1905). They married in Weißtropp near Dresden.

Juliane's father, Johann Krause (1779–1829), had achieved modest notability as a theologian and merchant. Her brother Robert Krause built a career as a landscape painter and travel writer.

Juliane's father Johann Krause was also a younger brother to Jacob von Krause (1775–1857), husband to Kirchenpauer's aunt and the man in whose Saint Petersburg home Kirchenpauer and his brothers had grown up while their own father traveled for his business. In addition to fostering the three Kirchenpauer boys, the sons of Julia's brother, Johann Georg, Jacob von Krause and his wife Julia had also, a few years later, looked after Robert and Juliane Kruse, the children of Jacob's brother Johann.

The marriage of Gustav Heinrich and Juliane Dorothea Kirchenpauer produced three recorded children:

- Gustav Jakob Kirchenpauer (1847–1914) became an architect.
- Ulrich Kirchenpauer (1859–1905) became an army officer.
- Flora Kirchenpauer married Hermann Stannius (1842–1912) who was at one stage he German consul in Smyrna (Izmir).
