= Rudolf Petersen =

German businessman and politician (1878–1962)

First Mayor of Hamburg and President of the Hamburg Senate
- In office 15 May 1945 – 15 November 1946
- Preceded by: Carl Vincent Krogmann
- Succeeded by: Max Brauer

Personal details
- Born: 30 December 1878 Hamburg
- Died: 10 September 1962 (aged 83) Wentorf bei Hamburg
- Party: CDU

Rudolf Hieronymus Petersen (30 December 1878 in Hamburg – 10 September 1962 in Wentorf bei Hamburg) was a German businessman, politician (CDU) and First Mayor of Hamburg (1945–46).

Petersen's brother Carl Wilhelm Petersen was head of Hamburg's government (first mayor) between 1924 and 1929 and again from 1932 to 1933. Their grandfather Carl Friedrich Petersen had officiated as first mayor several terms, last until his death in 1892. In 1911, Rudolf Petersen founded the business Rudolf Petersen und Co. — after several mergers today MPC Capital AG. In May 1945 after the World War II, Brigadier General Sir George Armytage — Military Governor of Hamburg — appointed Petersen mayor of Hamburg. Petersen joined the CDU. In 1946, he was followed by Max Brauer, who was elected as the First Mayor, and Petersen remained member of the Hamburg Parliament until 1949.
