= Rudolf Ross =

German teacher and politician

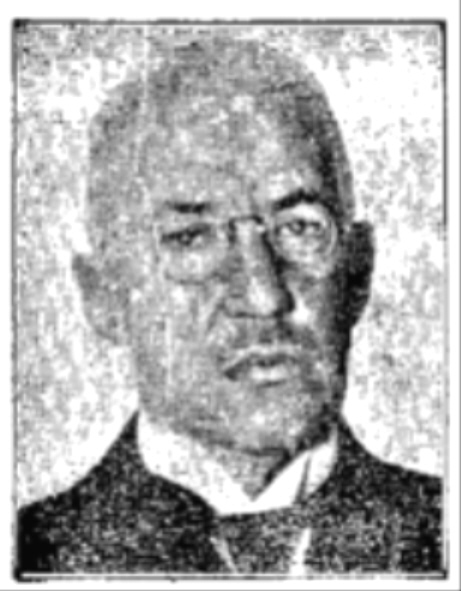

Second Mayor of Hamburg
- In office 5 April 1928 – 31 December 1929
- Preceded by: Max Schramm
- Succeeded by: Carl Wilhelm Petersen
- In office 1 January 1932 – 3 March 1933
- Preceded by: Carl Wilhelm Petersen
- Succeeded by: Wilhelm Amsinck Burchard-Motz

First Mayor of Hamburg and President of the Hamburg Senate
- In office 1 January 1930 – 31 December 1931
- Preceded by: Carl Wilhelm Petersen
- Succeeded by: Carl Wilhelm Petersen

Personal details
- Born: 22 March 1872 Hamburg, Germany
- Died: 16 February 1951 (aged 78) Hamburg, Germany
- Party: Social Democratic Party (SPD)

Rudolf Adolf Wilhelm Ross (also styled Roß, 22 March 1872 – 16 February 1951) was a German teacher, politician of the Social Democratic Party (SPD), member of the Hamburg Parliament and first Mayor of Hamburg.

== Early life ==
Ross was born on 22 March 1872 in Hamburg and became a teacher in 1892. He served in the First World War from 1914 until 1918. In 1923 he married his wife Frieda, née Hinsch (1899–1975).

== Political career ==
In 1919, Ross was elected as a member of the Hamburg Parliament and served until 1933. He was President of the diet from 1920 until 1928. In 1928 the parliament elected Ross to the Senate of Hamburg and became Second Mayor, 1930 – 1931 he was First Mayor of Hamburg. On 3 March 1933 he resigned from the Hamburg Parliament under protest to the Machtergreifung—the Nazi takeover of power in Weimar Germany on 30 January 1933.

== Death ==
On 16 February 1951, Ross died after a long and severe illness in Hamburg.

== Works ==
- Vorschläge zur Reform der Lehrerbildung in Hamburg (in German). Hamburg: Senger. 1913. OCLC 257912602.
- Hamburg während der Weimarer Republik : Reden und Aufsätze, anlässlich der Taufe des Dampfers "Bürgermeister Ross" (in German). Hamburg: Auerdruck. 1948. OCLC 73707056.
