= Carl Wilhelm Petersen =

German lawyer and politician

Carl Petersen
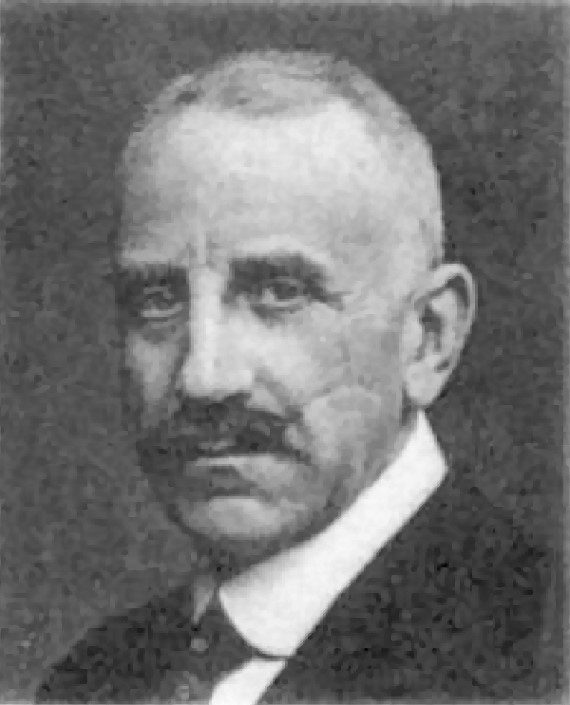

First Mayor of Hamburg and President of the Hamburg Senate
- In office 1 January 1924 – 31 December 1929
- Preceded by: Arnold Diestel
- Succeeded by: Rudolf Ross
- In office 1 January 1932 – 4 March 1933
- Preceded by: Rudolf Ross
- Succeeded by: Carl Vincent Krogmann

Member of the Reichstag
- In office 1920–1924
- Constituency: Hamburg

Personal details
- Born: 1 January 1868 Hamburg
- Died: 6 November 1933 (aged 65) Hamburg
- Party: German Democratic Party (German abbr.: DDP)
- Education: Ruperto Carola; Lipsiensis

Carl Wilhelm Petersen (1 January 1868 – 6 November 1933) was a German lawyer, politician for the German Democratic Party (German abbr.: DDP) and First Mayor of Hamburg (1924 – 29 and 1932 – 33).

Petersen, who in 1912 ranked among the 200 richest Hamburgers, was elected a member of the Hamburg Parliament in 1899. His grandfather Carl Friedrich Petersen had officiated as Hamburg's head of government (first burgomaster) until his death in 1892. A member of the Progressive People's Party he joined the faction of the right. After in 1906 Hamburg's new suffrage law (nicknamed Wahlrechtsraub, i.e. suffrage robbery) increased the influence of voters paying high taxes on the expense of others, which Petersen opposed, he joined the newly formed faction of the United Liberals, one of the predecessors of the post-World War I DDP. Petersen became the head of the United Liberals.

On 20 April 1918 the Hamburg Parliament elected Petersen a lifelong Senator of Hamburg. On 12 November 1918 the Hamburg revolutionary Soldiers' and Workers' Council deposed the Senate of Hamburg, but reappointed senate and senators as acting administration only on 18 November. In this function Petersen continued into the Weimar Republic, until the complete senate resigned on 27 March 1919, thus ending the life-term mandates under Hamburg's old 1860 constitution.

On 28–30 March 1919 the Hamburg Parliament, first time elected under equal suffrage by men and women of Hamburg, elected a new senate, into which Petersen and six more pre-war senators were reëlected, besides eleven new senators. Petersen gained 103 of 160 votes. Petersen was reëlected senator in 1921, 1924, 1928, 1931 and 1932. In 1919 Petersen himself was no member of the Hamburg Parliament any more, but returned from 1921 to 1924 and again from 1928 to 1933.

Petersen who had a Jewish mother, fought against anti-Semitism.

Bernhard Lustig, (1884-1969) who served with Hitler during WWI, in a 1961 interview recalled that in a meeting of the party in Munich, after a debate, Hitler had refused to talk about the issues but attacked, in rage, Petersen saying that his mother was of Jewish origin. To which Petersen proudly replied, "yes, my mother was Jewish; she was a wonderful woman."

From 1919 to 1924 he was president of the DDP, in the Weimar National Assembly (1919–1920) chairman of the Committee of Inquiry into War Guilt, then a member of the German Parliament, and in its successor German State Party he was one of three collegial speakers from 1932 to 1933. In 1924 his fellow senators elected him First Mayor of Hamburg, thus head of state and of government (president of the senate) - though under the auspices of a primus inter pares regulation -, and reëlected until 1929. Then Petersen became Second Mayor (deputy mayor) under his successor First Mayor Rudolf Ross, succeeding him again as of 1 January 1932. On 4 March 1933 he resigned from office as First Mayor and senator, unwilling to execute orders he considered illegal given by Hitler's new government. After the end of Hitler's reign the Control Commission for Germany - British Element appointed his younger brother Rudolf Petersen First Mayor in 1945.
