= Johann Georg Mönckeberg =

German politician (1839–1908)

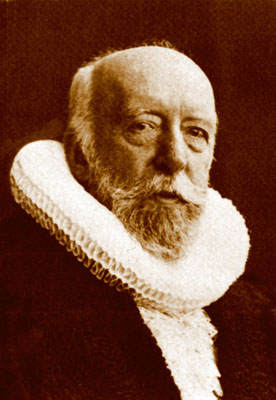
- Johann Georg Mönckeberg in Hamburg senator's ornate; photograph by Rudolf Dührkoop, 1905

Second Mayor of Hamburg
- In office 1 January 1889 – 31 December 1889
- Preceded by: Carl Petersen
- Succeeded by: Johannes Versmann
- In office 1 January 1892 – 31 December 1892
- Preceded by: Carl Petersen
- Succeeded by: Johannes Versmann
- In office 1 January 1895 – 31 December 1895
- Preceded by: Johannes Lehmann
- Succeeded by: Johannes Versmann
- In office 1 January 1898 – 31 December 1898
- Preceded by: Johannes Lehmann
- Succeeded by: Johannes Versmann
- In office 19 November 1900 – 31 December 1901
- Preceded by: Gerhard Hachmann
- Succeeded by: Heinrich Burchard
- In office 1 January 1904 – 11 July 1904
- Preceded by: Gerhard Hachmann
- Succeeded by: Heinrich Burchard
- In office 1 January 1907 – 31 December 1907
- Preceded by: Johann Otto Stammann
- Succeeded by: Heinrich Burchard

First Mayor of Hamburg and President of the Hamburg Senate
- In office 1 January 1890 – 31 December 1890
- Preceded by: Johannes Versmann
- Succeeded by: Johannes Versmann
- In office 1 January 1893 – 31 December 1893
- Preceded by: Carl Petersen
- Succeeded by: Johannes Versmann
- In office 1 January 1896 – 31 December 1896
- Preceded by: Johannes Lehmann
- Succeeded by: Johannes Versmann
- In office 1 January 1899 – 31 December 1899
- Preceded by: Johannes Lehmann
- Succeeded by: Johannes Lehmann
- In office 1 January 1902 – 31 December 1902
- Preceded by: Gerhard Hachmann
- Succeeded by: Heinrich Burchard
- In office 11 July 1904 – 31 December 1905
- Preceded by: Gerhard Hachmann
- Succeeded by: Heinrich Burchard
- In office 1 January 1908 – 27 March 1908
- Preceded by: Johann Otto Stammann
- Succeeded by: Heinrich Burchard

Personal details
- Born: 22 August 1839 Hamburg
- Died: 27 March 1908 (aged 68) Hamburg
- Party: Nonpartisan
- Education: University of Heidelberg, University of Göttingen
- Occupation: Lawyer

Johann Georg Mönckeberg (born 22 August 1839 in Hamburg, died 27 March 1908 in Hamburg) was a Hamburg politician, who served as First Mayor of Hamburg in 1890, 1893, 1896, 1899, 1902, 1904–1905, and 1908.

He studied law at Heidelberg University and at the University of Göttingen, and worked as a lawyer in Hamburg from 1862. He was elected to the Hamburg Parliament in 1871 and became a Senator in 1876, serving until his death.

The Mönckebergstraße is named in his honour. He was married to Elise Mathilde Tesdorpf.
