= Johann Heinrich Burchard =

German lawyer and politician

Heinrich Burchard
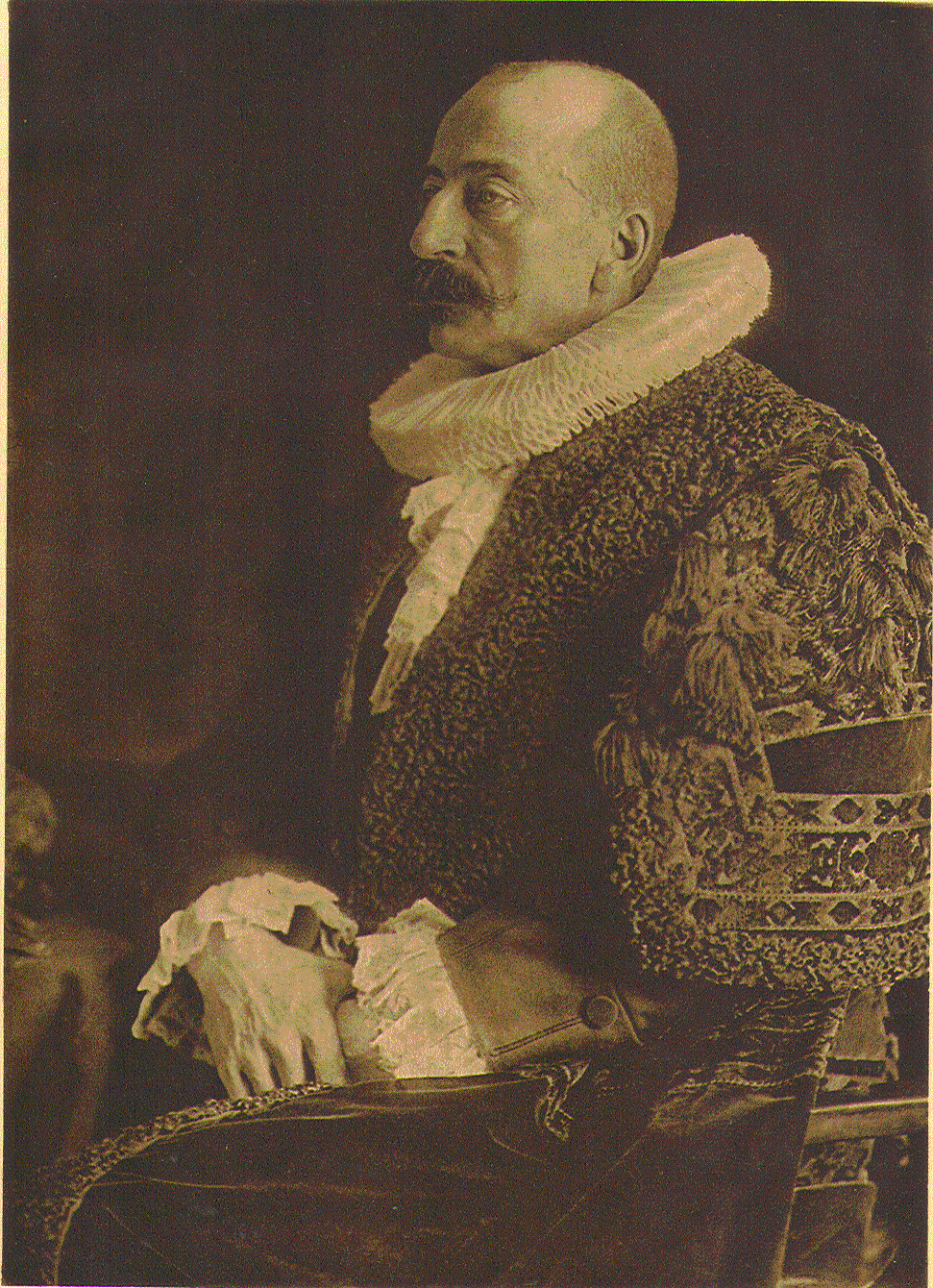
- Johann Heinrich Burchard in Hamburg senator's ornate, 1905; by Rudolf Dührkoop

Second Mayor of Hamburg
- In office 1 January 1902 – 31 December 1902
- Preceded by: Johann Georg Mönckeberg
- Succeeded by: Gerhard Hachmann
- In office 11 July 1904 – 31 December 1905
- Preceded by: Johann Georg Mönckeberg
- Succeeded by: Johann Stammann
- In office 1 January 1908 – 3 April 1908
- Preceded by: Johann Georg Mönckeberg
- Succeeded by: William Henry O'Swald
- In office 1 January 1911 – 6 September 1911
- Preceded by: August Schröder
- Succeeded by: August Schröder

First Mayor of Hamburg and President of the Hamburg Senate
- In office 1 January 1903 – 31 December 1903
- Preceded by: Johann Georg Mönckeberg
- Succeeded by: Gerhard Hachmann
- In office 1 January 1906 – 31 December 1906
- Preceded by: Johann Georg Mönckeberg
- Succeeded by: Johann Stammann
- In office 3 April 1908 – 31 December 1909
- Preceded by: Johann Georg Mönckeberg
- Succeeded by: Max Predöhl
- In office 1 January 1912 – 6 September 1912
- Preceded by: Max Predöhl
- Succeeded by: August Schröder

Personal details
- Born: 26 July 1852 Bremen
- Died: 6 September 1912 (aged 60) Hamburg
- Party: Nonpartisan
- Education: Lipsiensis; Ruperto Carola; Georgia Augusta

Johann Heinrich Burchard (26 July 1852 – 6 September 1912) was a Hamburg lawyer and politician who served as senator (from 1885 until his death) and First Mayor and President of the Senate of the Free and Hanseatic City of Hamburg (in 1903, 1906, 1908–1909 and from 1 January 1912 until his death).

Burchard was born in Bremen, a member of the Hanseatic Burchard family, the son of banker Friedrich Wilhelm Burchard (1824–92) and Marianne Gossler (1830–1908), a granddaughter of Senator and banker Johann Heinrich Gossler and a great-granddaughter of Johann Hinrich Gossler and Elisabeth Berenberg. His father was a merchant in Bremen, who in 1853 became a partner of the Berenberg Bank (Joh. Berenberg, Gossler & Co.) owned by his wife's family. The family then relocated to Hamburg, where, after taking part in the Franco-Prussian War as a volunteer, he completed his abitur at the Gelehrtenschule des Johanneums before studying law at the Universities of Leipzig, Heidelberg and Göttingen.

As a typical Hanseat, he rejected noble titles and any form of awards.

A portrait of Burchard by Max Liebermann is displayed at Hamburg's representation (embassy) in Berlin.

In 1877, he married Emily Henriette Amsinck (1858–1931), a daughter of Wilhelm Amsinck (1821–1909). His oldest son, Wilhelm Amsinck Burchard-Motz, was also a Hamburg senator and Second Mayor.

Heinrich Burchard died in Hamburg, aged 60.
