= Nicolaus Ferdinand Haller =

German jurist and senator

Ferdinand Haller
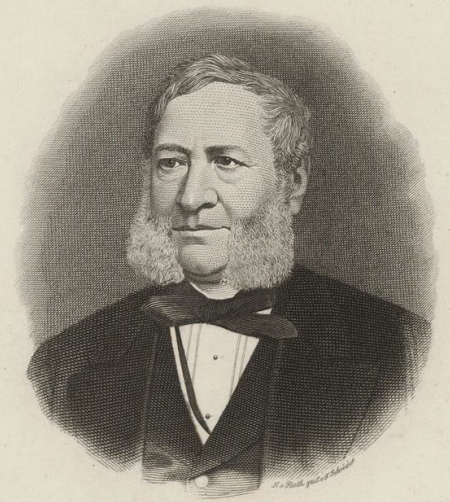

First Mayor of Hamburg and President of the Hamburg Senate
- In office 1 January 1863 – 31 December 1864
- Preceded by: Friedrich Sieveking
- Succeeded by: Friedrich Sieveking
- In office 1 January 1866 – 31 December 1867
- Preceded by: Friedrich Sieveking
- Succeeded by: Friedrich Sieveking
- In office 1 January 1870 – 31 December 1870
- Preceded by: Gustav Kirchenpauer
- Succeeded by: Gustav Kirchenpauer
- In office 1 January 1873 – 31 December 1873
- Preceded by: Gustav Kirchenpauer
- Succeeded by: Hermann Goßler

Second Mayor of Hamburg
- In office 1 January 1869 – 31 December 1869
- Preceded by: Gustav Kirchenpauer
- Succeeded by: Hermann Goßler
- In office 1 January 1872 – 31 December 1872
- Preceded by: Hermann Goßler
- Succeeded by: Hermann Goßler
- In office 1 January 1875 – 31 December 1875
- Preceded by: Gustav Kirchenpauer
- Succeeded by: Hermann Weber

Personal details
- Born: 21 January 1805 Hamburg, German Confederation
- Died: 10 October 1876 (aged 71) Hamburg, German Empire
- Party: Nonpartisan
- Education: Ruperto Carola; Georgia Augusta
- Occupation: Lawyer

Nicolaus Ferdinand Haller (21 January 1805 in Hamburg – 10 October 1876 in Hamburg) was a jurist, a senator and the First Mayor of Hamburg, and the head of state from 1863 to 1864; 1866 to 1867; 1870 to 1873.

== Family ==
The Haller family was one of the 50 Jewish families expelled from Vienna, whom the Great Elector Frederick William of Brandenburg (reign 1640–1688) had granted asylum in his realm. The family first settled in Frederick William's Duchy of Magdeburg in the city of Halle upon Saale, whence it adopted its surname. Ferdinand Haller's grandfather Joseph Benjamin Haller died in Halle in 1772. Ferdinand Haller's father later moved to Hamburg.

Ferdinand Haller's parents were Blümchen Gottschalk from Hanover and Mendel Joseph Haller (1770–1852), who was technically a Schutzjude under the more liberal Danish rule in Holsteinian Altona, allowing them to practically work and live in the adjacent, but more restrictive Hamburg.

In 1794, Mendel Joseph Haller founded a banking and trading company in Hamburg, from which in 1797, the Bank Haller, Söhle & Co. developed. Ferdinand's elder sister Auguste (1799–1883) married Johann Christian Söhle (1801–1871), the son of their father's partner in the bank. Blümchen Gottschalk's sister Amalie (1777–1838) was married to Baron Ludwig von Stieglitz, court banker of Alexander I of Russia. Mendel Joseph Haller's niece Philippine Haller (1822–1892) was married to the wealthy cotton merchant Louis Liebermann, parents of the painter Max Liebermann.

In early 1805, the elders of Altona's Ashkenazi kehilla sued Haller's father at Altona's Beit Din for not having had Ferdinand Haller circumcised. The Beit Din inflicted the ḥērem on Mendel Joseph Haller and, as was the law, prompted the secular authorities to execute that ban.

Already for quite some time Mendel Joseph Haller was inclined not to observe Jewish law and looked for a solution to live an enlightened life, as he described to Allermöhe's Pastor Karl Johann Heinrich Hübbe in a letter on 30 May 1805. Without pious devotion to Christianity, but vaguely acknowledging Lutheranism's supposed offer to live a life as he described, Haller delicately explained to Hübbe his wish for a fast and secret conversion.

On 26 June 1805 Hübbe baptised the Hallers, with the parents adopting altered first names, Elisabeth instead of Blümchen and Martin instead of Mendel, and their children Nicolaus Ferdinand and his elder sister and brother Augusta (Auguste) Clara and Wilhelm Ludwig, all taken place far out of Hamburg in the Trinity Church of Allermöhe. Lutheranism was the prevailing Christian denomination in Hamburg and Altona. In later years Martin Joseph Haller became a lay judge for commercial matters.

In 1831 Ferdinand Haller married Philippine Adele Oppenheimer (1807–1873), sister of Georg Oppenheimer, lawyer, jurist and judge at the Supreme Court of Appeal of the four Free Cities in Lübeck, whose family (except for their father Jacob Oppenheimer [1778–1845]) was baptised by Hübbe by 1813. Adele Oppenheimer was a cousin of Johann Gustav Heckscher. Ferdinand Haller became through one sister of his wife brother-in-law of the Hamburg Senator Johann Carl Gottlieb Arning (1786–1862) and through another sister of hers uncle of the future Lübeck mayor Emil Ferdinand Fehling.

Ferdinand Haller's son, Martin Emil Ferdinand Haller, was a known architect of Hamburg.

== Career ==
Ferdinand Haller studied law at the Ruperto Carola in Heidelberg and the Georgia Augusta in Göttingen. In 1827 Haller set up as lawyer in Hamburg, mostly busy in matters of commercial law.

In 1844 the Senate of Hamburg, the executive government of the city-state, coöpted Haller as fellow senator. As a senator Haller engaged in the debate on and reform of the Hamburg constitution. Under the new constitution of 1860 the senate reformed too in 1861. The new constitution provided for the election of senators by the Hamburg Parliament, doing away with the senate's prior coöptation. Haller was one of the pre-reform senators who remained in office. After 1860 he was a successful senator of finance presiding over the deputation of finances (Finanzdeputation), a joint commission of burghers and officials competent for the city-state's budget.

Besides his colleague Gustav Kirchenpauer, with whom he rotated in office as First Mayor, Haller was one of the formative personalities of the period. From 17 August to 1 September 1863 Haller represented Hamburg in the Frankfurt meeting (Congress of Frankfurt) of federal princes and burgomasters of the states within the German Confederacy. On 30 June 1876 the gout-ridden Haller resigned from senatorship, and died later the same year.

== Hallerstraße ==
The Hallerstraße and the homonymous underground station in Hamburg are named in Haller's honour. In 1938 the Nazi senate of Hamburg renamed street and station, arguing that Haller's parents were Jewish. In 1945 station and street were given back their original name.
