= Bürgermeisterpfennig =

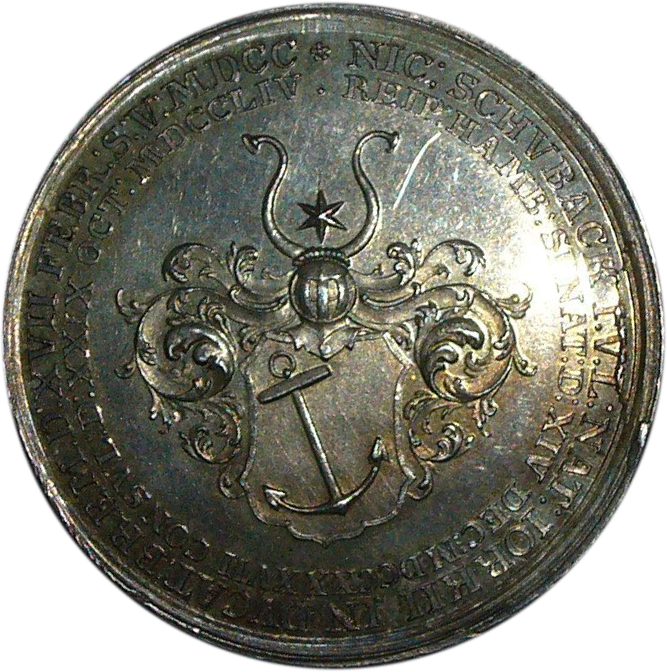
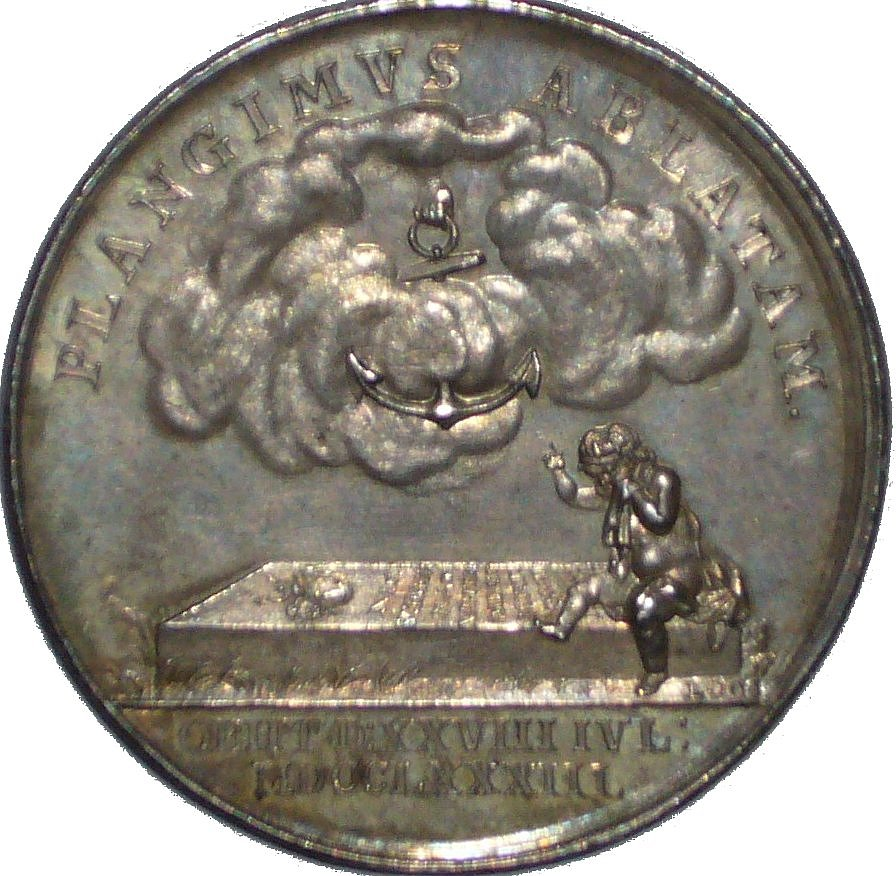
Bürgermeisterpfennig in honour of Nicolaus Schuback, d 28 July 1783, obverse and reverse

A Bürgermeisterpfennig is a small silver coin that was issued in Hamburg after the death of a Mayor of Hamburg on the occasion of his funeral and which depicted the coat of arms as well as the biographical information and dates of office of the deceased mayor.

== History ==
In older times it was customary in Hamburg, at the funeral of a mayor, to distribute small coins worth a quarter of a thaler to the students who were singing ahead of the hearse and perhaps to others in the funeral procession. The family of Mayor Johann Schrött, who died in 1676, first had the idea of having their own coin minted for this purpose. On the next few occasions, however, this example was not followed; instead twelve schilling pieces were handed out again. It was not until 1697, when Mayor Johann Schulte died, that his family had his own pfennig minted again. After that, the tradition was continued. At first they were content to mint them from 1/2 Lot of thaler silver; in later times, however, they were made of fine silver and varied in weight according to how wealthy and generous the deceased's family was. Several Bürgermeisterpfennigs have become quite valuable and there are also isolated cases where several coins of different weights and sizes were made at the same time. The smaller ones were distributed, for example, to the students, the larger ones to persons of higher rank.

In more recent times, there has been a move away from large, ceremonial funeral processions, so there has been no distribution of gifts to students and other mourners, and it has been sufficient to distribute the pfennigs to members of the Hamburg Senate, Hamburg College of Elders and to the relatives and friends of the deceased. The mayors received golden specimens, which is why they also appear every now and then, albeit very rarely. As a rule, they depict the family crest of the deceased with their name, dates of birth, election and death on the obverse and emblems or allusions to their character and merits on the reverse. In more recent times a bust portrait has often been incorporated.

== List of Bürgermeisterpfennigs ==
- 1676 Johann Schrötteringk
- 1687 Dieterich Möller (12 schilling coin)
- 1697 Johann Schulte
- 1697 Johann Diedrich Schaffshausen
- 1702 Hieronymus Hartwig Möller
- 1703 Julius Surland
- 1704 Joachim Lemmermann
- 1709 Peter von Lengerke
- 1712 Paul Paulsen
- 1716 Lucas von Bostel
- 1717 Peter Lütkens the Younger
- 1720 Bernhard Matfeld
- 1722 Ludwig Becceler
- 1723 Gerhard Schröder
- 1728 Hinrich Diederich Wiese
- 1729 Hans Jacob Faber
- 1732 Garlieb Sillem
- 1739 Daniel Stockfleth
- 1741 Joh. Hermann Luis
- 1742 Rütger Rulant
- 1743 Johann Anderson
- 1749 Nicolaus Stampeel
- 1750 Clemens Samuel von Lipstorp
- 1751 Martin Lucas Schele
- 1751 Lucas von Spreckelsen
- 1754 Conrad Widow
- 1765 Lucas Corthum
- 1774 Martin Hieronymus Schele
- 1778 Johannes Schlüter
- 1780 Peter Greve
- 1781 Vincent Rumpff
- 1783 Nicolaus Schuback
- 1784 Frans Doormann
- 1786 Albert Schulte
- 1788 Johann Luis
- 1790 Johann Anderson
- 1798 Martin Dorner
- 1800 Jacob Albrecht von Sienen the Elder
- 1801 Franz Anton Wagener
- 1802 Peter Hinrich Widow
- 1807 Johann Adolph Poppe
- 1816 Daniel Lienau
- 1820 Friedrich von Graffen
- 1821 Christian Matthias Schröder
- 1829 Johann Daniel Koch
- 1831 Wilhelm Amsinck
- 1834 Johann Arnold Heise
- 1835 Martin Garlieb Sillem
- 1835 Martin Hieronymus Schrötteringk
- 1842 Amandus Augustus Abendroth
- 1844 David Schlüter
- 1851 Christian Daniel Benecke

== Literature ==
- Franklin Kopitzsch, Daniel Tilgner (eds.): Hamburg-Lexikon. 2. durchgesehene Auflage. Zeise, Hamburg 2000, ISBN 3-9805687-9-2.
- Johann Paul Langermann: Hamburgisches Münz- und Medaillen-Vergnügen oder Abbildung und Beschreibung Hamburgischer Münzen und Medaillen. Hamburg 1753.
- Verein für Hamburgische Geschichte (publ.): Hamburgische Münzen und Medaillen. 3 vols. Meißner, Hamburg 1850–1876.
