= Versmann =

Versmann is a surname. Notable people with the surname include:

- Ernst Friedrich Versmann (1814–1873), German theologian
- Johannes Versmann (1820–1899), German lawyer and politician
