= Hein Hoyer =

Medieval German politician

Hein Hoyer (lat. Hinricus Hoyeri) (c. 1380 in Hamburg – 12 May 1447 in Hamburg) was a German statesman and mayor of Hamburg.

His family belonged to the local upper class and Hoyer was elected as a member of the Rat (board/council), where he defended the interests of the bourgeois opposition against the older families, in 1413. The politician was selected as burgomaster (mayor) and head of the delegation to the Hanseatic League as well as to the Council of Constance four years later.

Hoyer played a major role in the negotiations of the peace treaty of Vordingborg (1435), between the Hanseatic League and Adolf VIII, Count of Holstein on the one and Denmark on the other side.
