= Carl Friedrich Petersen =

German lawyer and politician (1809–1892)

Carl Petersen
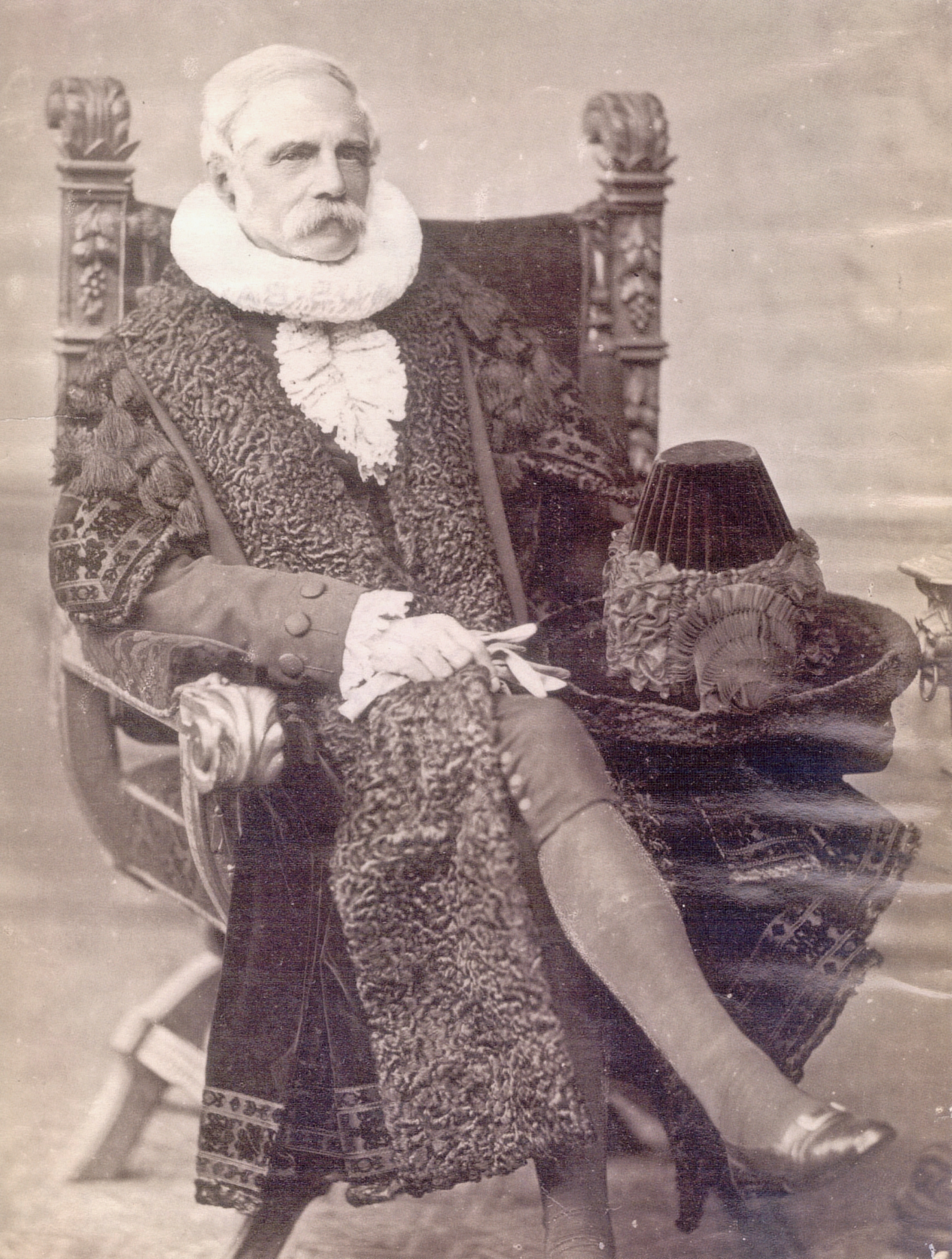
- Carl Petersen in the ornate uniform of the Hamburg senate; by Rudolf Dührkoop

First Mayor of Hamburg and President of the Hamburg Senate
- In office 1 January 1876 – 31 December 1877
- Preceded by: Gustav Kirchenpauer
- Succeeded by: Gustav Kirchenpauer
- In office 1 January 1880 – 31 December 1880
- Preceded by: Hermann Weber
- Succeeded by: Gustav Kirchenpauer
- In office 1 January 1883 – 31 December 1883
- Preceded by: Hermann Weber
- Succeeded by: Gustav Kirchenpauer
- In office 1 January 1886 – 31 December 1886
- Preceded by: Hermann Weber
- Succeeded by: Gustav Kirchenpauer
- In office 1 January 1889 – 31 December 1889
- Preceded by: Johannes Versmann
- Succeeded by: Johann Georg Mönckeberg
- In office 1 January 1892 – 14 November 1892
- Preceded by: Johannes Versmann
- Succeeded by: Johann Georg Mönckeberg

Second Mayor of Hamburg
- In office 1 January 1879 – 31 December 1879
- Preceded by: Hermann Weber
- Succeeded by: Gustav Kirchenpauer
- In office 1 January 1882 – 31 December 1882
- Preceded by: Hermann Weber
- Succeeded by: Gustav Kirchenpauer
- In office 1 January 1885 – 31 December 1885
- Preceded by: Hermann Weber
- Succeeded by: Gustav Kirchenpauer
- In office 1 January 1889 – 31 December 1889
- Preceded by: Max Theodor Hayn
- Succeeded by: Johann Georg Mönckeberg
- In office 1 January 1891 – 31 December 1891
- Preceded by: Johannes Versmann
- Succeeded by: Johann Georg Mönckeberg

Personal details
- Born: 6 July 1809 Hamburg
- Died: 14 November 1892 (aged 83) Hamburg
- Party: Nonpartisan
- Spouse: Kathinka Hasche (1813–1863)
- Children: 5
- Parent: Marcus Hermann Petersen (1784–1860)
- Education: Georgia Augusta, Ruperto Carola
- Occupation: Lawyer

Carl Friedrich Petersen (6 July 1809 in Hamburg – 14 November 1892 in Hamburg) was a Hamburg lawyer and politician, who served several terms as First Mayor of Hamburg. He was a Hamburg senator from 1855 until his death.

== Education and early career ==
He studied law at the University of Göttingen and at Heidelberg University, and earned a doctorate in 1830. After a stay in Paris, he became a burgher of Hamburg in 1831 and practised as a lawyer.

== Public life ==
From the 1830s, he held numerous public offices, and he was elected as a senator in 1855. In 1861 he became First Lord of Police (i.e. Minister of Police and the Interior). He became First Mayor in 1876 and was reelected in the following year. He also served as Second and First Mayor during the terms 1879/80, 1882/83, 1885/86, 1888/89 and 1891/92.

== Family ==
Two grandsons by his son Gustav Petersen, Carl Wilhelm Petersen and Rudolf Hieronymus Petersen, also officiated as first mayors of Hamburg, the former between 1924 and 1929 and again 1932 and 1933, the latter from 1945 to 1946.
