= Nicolaus Schuback =

German lawyer

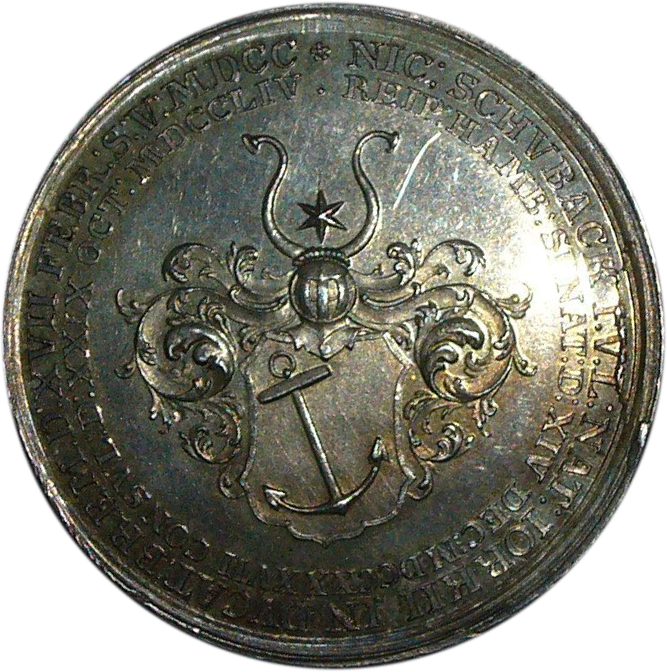
Front (1783)

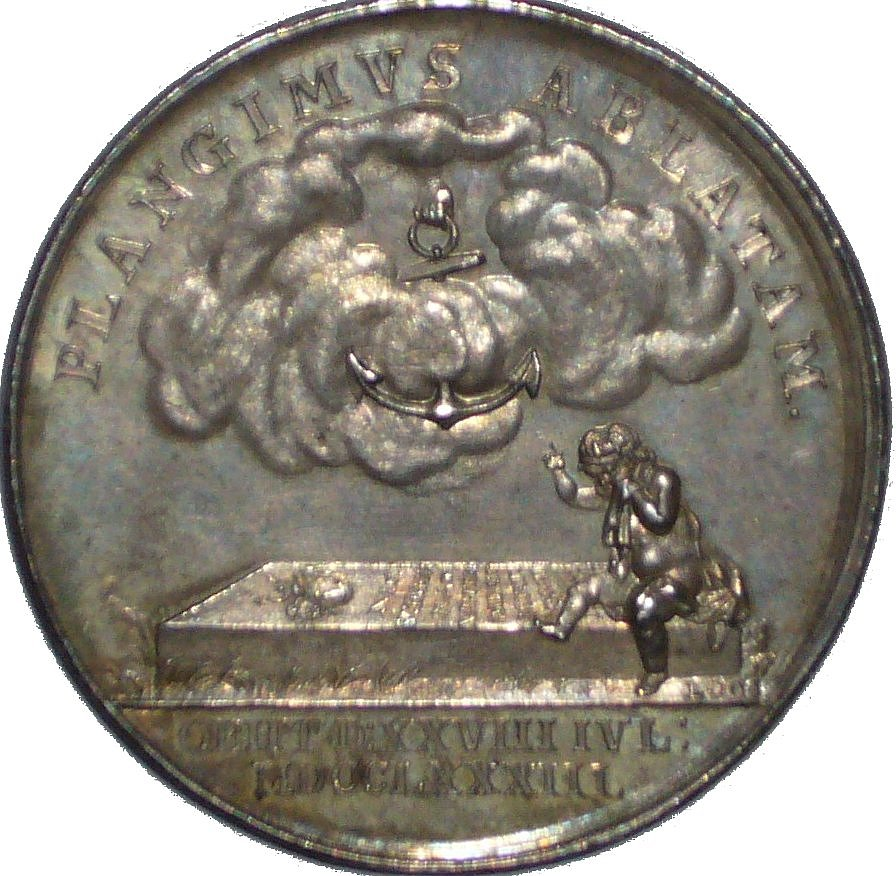
Back (1783)

Nicolaus Schuback (February 18, 1700, Jork – July 28, 1783, Hamburg) was a lawyer from Germany. In the time from October 29, 1754 till August 28, 1782 he was mayor of Hamburg. Upon his death his family minted a special coin which was given to the people who attended the funeral.

== See also ==
- List of mayors of Hamburg

== Sources ==
Otto Beneke (1891). "Schuback, Nikolaus". Allgemeine Deutsche Biographie (in German). Vol. 32. Leipzig: Duncker & Humblot. p. 587.
