= Johannes Versmann =

German lawyer and politician

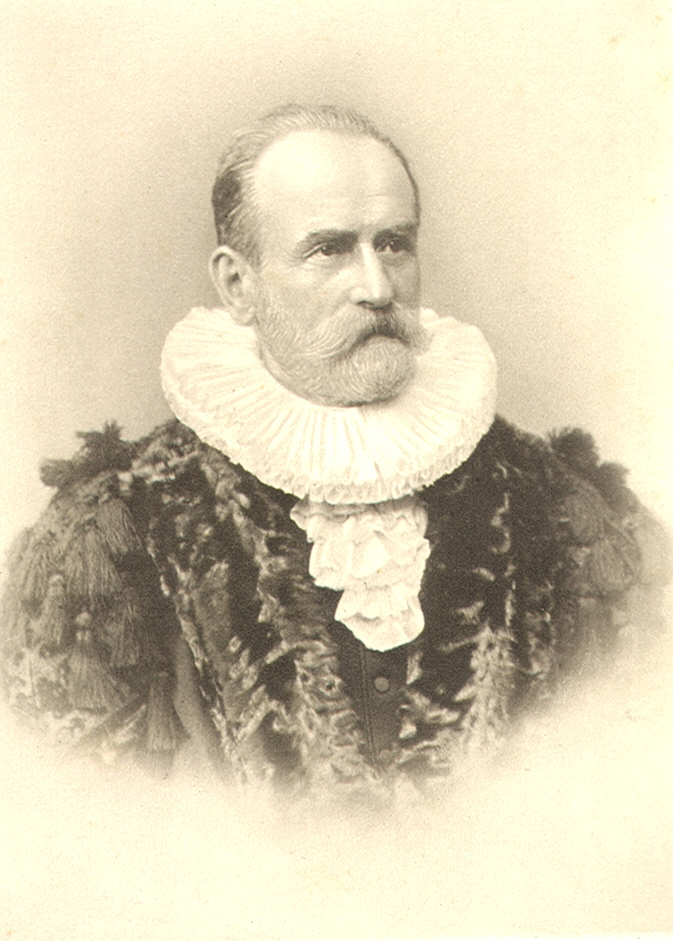
- Johannes Versmann as First Mayor of Hamburg

Second Mayor of Hamburg
- In office 1 January 1887 – 14 March 1887
- Preceded by: Gustav Kirchenpauer
- Succeeded by: Max Theodor Hayn
- In office 1 January 1890 – 31 December 1890
- Preceded by: Johann Georg Mönckeberg
- Succeeded by: Carl Petersen
- In office 1 January 1893 – 31 December 1893
- Preceded by: Johann Georg Mönckeberg
- Succeeded by: Johannes Lehmann
- In office 1 January 1896 – 31 December 1896
- Preceded by: Johann Georg Mönckeberg
- Succeeded by: Johannes Lehmann
- In office 1 January 1912 – 6 September 1912
- Preceded by: Johann Georg Mönckeberg
- Succeeded by: Johannes Lehmann

First Mayor of Hamburg and President of the Hamburg Senate
- In office 14 March 1887 – 31 December 1888
- Preceded by: Gustav Kirchenpauer
- Succeeded by: Carl Petersen
- In office 1 January 1889 – 31 December 1889
- Preceded by: Carl Petersen
- Succeeded by: Johann Georg Mönckeberg
- In office 1 January 1891 – 31 December 1891
- Preceded by: Johann Georg Mönckeberg
- Succeeded by: Carl Petersen
- In office 1 January 1894 – 31 December 1894
- Preceded by: Johann Georg Mönckeberg
- Succeeded by: Johannes Lehmann
- In office 1 January 1897 – 31 December 1897
- Preceded by: Johann Georg Mönckeberg
- Succeeded by: Johannes Lehmann

Personal details
- Born: 7 January 1820 Sankt Pauli
- Died: 28 July 1899 (aged 79) Hamburg
- Party: Nonpartisan
- Education: Ruperto Carola; Georgia Augusta

Johannes Georg Andreas Versmann (7 December 1820 in Sankt Pauli – 28 July 1899 in Hamburg) was a German lawyer and politician. He was the first president of the new Bürgerschaft of Hamburg in 1859 and dominated the politics of the Hanseatic state as first or second mayor between 1887 and 1899.

== Life ==
Versmann was educated in the classical institutions of the city, Christianeum, where he established a lifelong friendship with the classical scholar Theodor Mommsen, and Johanneum until 1840. He studied law at the Georgia Augusta in Göttingen and at the Ruperto Carola in Heidelberg until 1844 and settled as lawyer in Hamburg in the same year. Versmann came in contact with the ideas of liberalism during his studies and stayed with them throughout his life.

== Politics ==
The lawyer was elected as a liberal member of the Hamburger Konstituante in 1848 but the restoration, supported and enforced by Prussian troops during the First Schleswig War, led to the removal of this body 1850.

The next political engagement was the membership of the first Hamburg Parliament (Bürgerschaft) in 1859. The liberal politician became president of the parliament and stayed in this office until 1861, when he was elected as one of the 24 lifelong members of the governing Senate of Hamburg (senate). Versmann became second mayor for the first time in 1887.

== Customs Union (Zollverein) ==
In May 1879, the imperial chancellor asked the Hamburg Senate to accede to the German Customs Union as provided for in Article 34 of the Constitution. The Senate rejected this, citing the effect on the city's maritime trade, especially with the new high external tariff of the Customs Union. Versmann came to the conclusion that any alteration of the existing state of affairs would severely impair the competitiveness of Hamburg. On April 27, 1880, Versmann replaced Kirchenpauer as Hamburg's plenipotentiary to the Federal Council (Bundesrat) in Berlin. There, he carefully raised Hamburg's reservations concerning absorption in the Customs Union.

However, it became clear that an absolute opposition to Bismarck's plans on this matter would be pointless. On 29 June 1880, the Chamber of Commerce wrote to the Senate stating:

“Hamburg has an opponent, who pursues his aims without recklessness, as long as he considers them to be the right one, an opponent whom we naturally cannot cope with, the opinion of which is not to be misjudged, whether it be in a political or commercial sense”.

It called on the Senate to negotiate with Prussia proposing a smaller free trade district, with facilities for Hamburg's export industry. The Senate was still largely against the Customs Union. Meanwhile, the public were under the impression that the chamber of commerce still wanted to maintain the status of Hamburg as a free port city. With this double-tracked approach – public opposition and private concessions - Versmann and the Chamber of Commerce attempted to strengthen the Hamburg's position.

In December 1880 and January 1881, Versmann, Senator O’Swald and Hugo Roeloffs (First Secretary of the Deputation for Indirect Taxes) held "informational discussions" with the Prussian Superior Customs Inspector Klostermann and the Prussian Finance Minister Karl Bitter, then in April 1881 they started actual negotiations.

On 25 May 1881 an agreement was reached, signed by Prussian Finance Minister Bitter and the State Secretary of the imperial Treasury, on the one hand, and Hamburg's Plenipotentiary Senators Versmann and O'Swald, and the envoy of the Hanseatic states in Berlin Dr. Friedrich Krüger, on the other. It stated that Hamburg would join the customs union with all its territory, except for a free port district which it specified. For this district, Article 34 would still apply, thus the freedoms of that district could not be abolished without Hamburg's approval. On 3 June the Senate voted in favour, despite the opposition of Kirchenpauer, followed by the Burgerschaft (House of Burgesses) on 15 June. The agreement came into effect in October 1888, while Versmann was First Mayor.

== Later life ==
Up to his old age, Versmann was active in the most diverse fields of public life; he was also first mayor again in 1891, 1894 and 1897. He died after a long illness on 28 July 1899.

== Notes ==
| Preceded by none | President of the Hamburg Parliament; 1859–1861 | Succeeded by Isaac Wolffson |
