= 353 Ruperto-Carola =

Main-belt asteroid

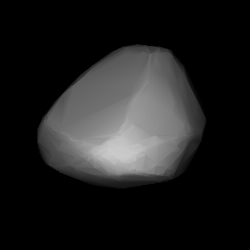
- Modelled shape of Ruperto-Carola

Discovery
- Discovered by: Max Wolf
- Discovery date: 16 January 1893

Designations
- Named after: Ruprecht Karls University
- Alternative designations: 1893 F · A893 BB
- Minor planet category: Main belt

Orbital characteristics
- Epoch 31 July 2016 (JD 2457600.5)
- Uncertainty parameter 0
- Observation arc: 123.20 yr (44997 d)
- Aphelion: 3.63014 AU (543.061 Gm)
- Perihelion: 1.84116 AU (275.434 Gm)
- Semi-major axis: 2.73565 AU (409.247 Gm)
- Eccentricity: 0.32697
- Orbital period (sidereal): 4.52 yr (1652.7 d)
- Mean anomaly: 145.519°
- Mean motion: 0° 13^{m} 4.177^{s} / day
- Inclination: 5.70668°
- Longitude of ascending node: 102.486°
- Argument of perihelion: 321.460°

Physical characteristics
- Mean diameter: 14.025±0.784 km
- Synodic rotation period: 2.73898 h
- Absolute magnitude (H): 11.0

353 Ruperto-Carola (prov. designation: A893 BB or 1893 F) is a background asteroid from the central region of the asteroid belt. It was discovered by German astronomer Max Wolf at the Heidelberg Observatory on 16 January 1893. It is named after the Ruprecht Karls University (University of Heidelberg), whose Latin name is Ruperto Carola Heidelbergensis.
