= Wilhelm Amsinck Burchard-Motz =

German lawyer and national-liberal politician (1878–1963)

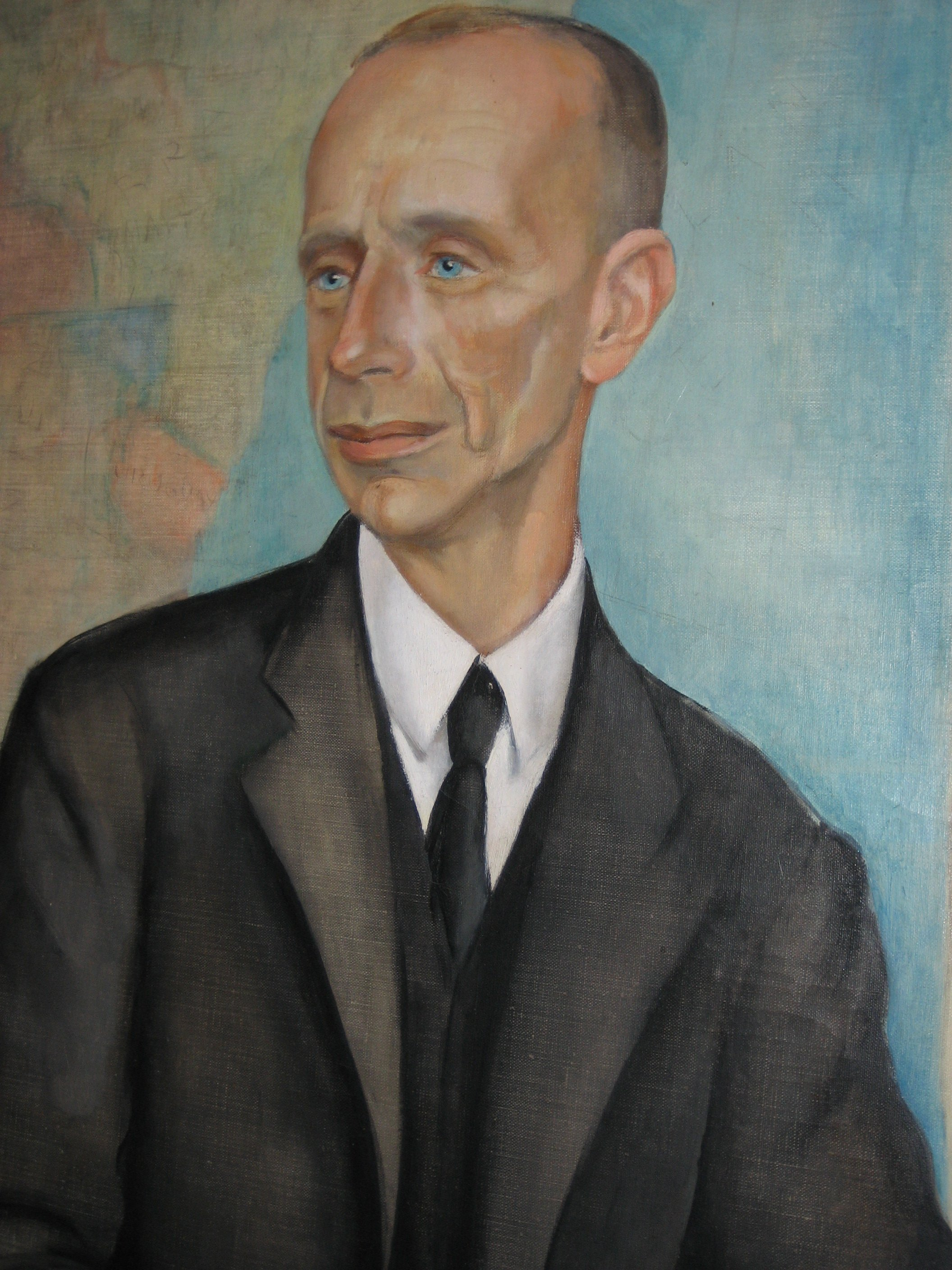
Burchard-Motz painted by Anita Rée

Wilhelm Amsinck Burchard-Motz (4 July 1878 in Hamburg, – 13 January 1963 in Hamburg) was a German lawyer and national-liberal politician. He served as Senator for Trade, Shipping and Industry of Hamburg from 1925 to 1933 and as Second Mayor from 1933 to 1934. Burchard-Motz was a member of the Nazi Party.

He was the son of Hamburg's First Mayor Johann Heinrich Burchard, and Emily Amsinck. Following studies in Heidelberg, Lausanne and Cambridge, he worked as a lawyer in Hamburg from 1904, where he was a member of the Esche Schümann Commichau (chambers, as in an association of barristers).

In the 1950s, he was Vice President of the German Golf Association.
