= Constitution of Hamburg =

Basic governing document of Hamburg, Germany

The Constitution of the Free and Hanseatic city of Hamburg (German: Verfassung der Freien und Hansestadt Hamburg) is the basic governing document of the German city-state of Hamburg. It was approved on 6 June 1952. It is the fourth constitution that the state has had, consists of 76 articles, and has been amended 34 times.

== History ==
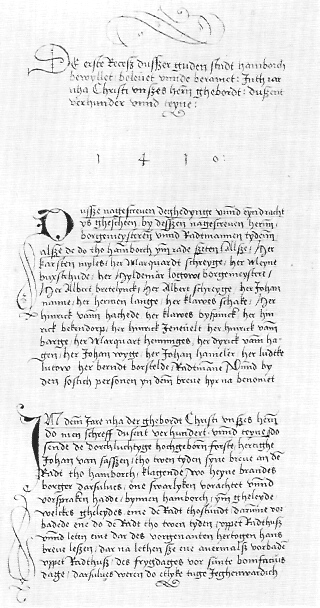
The first Rezeß of 1410

Erich and Martin Verg considered a document called "the first Rezeß" of 1410 as the first constitution of Hamburg, although it has had no democratically founded proceedings to establish it.

The first official constitution was established on 28 September 1860. It introduced a form of representative democracy with limitations on the right to vote, e.g. only males could vote. On 13 October 1879 a new constitution (Verfassung der freien und Hansestadt Hamburg) was created.

After the First World War in 1919 in the parliamentary Weimar Republic, the Hamburg Parliament ratified a temporary constitution (titled Gesetz über die Vorläufige Staatsgewalt), with an official constitution (titled Verfassung der Freien und Hansestadt Hamburg) being formally approved in 1921.

The constitution of 1952 was ratified by the Hamburg Parliament.

== Content ==
The constitution consists of 76 articles and a preamble. Dieter Läpple noted the importance placed by the preamble on the fact that Hamburg is a port and trade city, stating the following:

The preamble of the constitution of Hamburg points out the close relationship between port and city with regard to their development: "As an international port the Free and Hanseatic City of Hamburg has a special task, allocated by its history and location, to perform for the German people. In the spirit of peace it wants to be an intermediary between all continents and peoples of the world."

It is divided into the following sections:

- legal foundations (I). In contrast to the other two city-states Berlin and Bremen the constitution does not separate between state (Land) and local communal affairs.
- sections for the Hamburg Parliament (II) and senate (III)
- law (IV) and administration (V)
- jurisdiction (VI)
- budget and finance (VII)
- and final and transitional provisions (VIII)

Because the constitution was approved in 1959, after the Basic Law for the Federal Republic of Germany (approved in 1949)—which is the document that establishes and describes the duties, powers, structure and function of the government in Germany and legal also for the German states (federal law supersedes state law)—a section outlining human or basic rights (fundamental rights) is missing.

== Constitutional institutions ==
The legislature is the Hamburg Parliament, the judiciary is the Hamburg Constitutional Court (Hamburgisches Verfassungsgericht) and the executive is represented by the senate (the cabinet), which is headed by the First Mayor of Hamburg (Erster Bürgermeister der Freien und Hansestadt Hamburg), a position equivalent to a prime minister or minister-president.

== Amendments ==
The constitution has been amended 34 times since 1952.

== Literature ==
- Werner Thieme: Verfassung der Freien und Hansestadt Hamburg. Kommentar mit einem Anhang Hamburgischer staatsrechtlicher Gesetze. Harvestehuder Fachverlag, Hamburg 1998. ISBN 978-3-933375-00-1 (in German)
- 50 Jahre Verfassung der Freien und Hansestadt Hamburg : Festakt am 6. Juni 2002 im Hamburger Rathaus, Hamburgische Bürgerschaft, Hamburg 2002. OCLC 76454634 (in German)
