= Carl Vincent Krogmann =

German banker, industrialist and Nazi Party politician

Carl Vincent Krogmann (3 March 1889, in Hamburg – 14 March 1978, in Hamburg) was a German banker, industrialist and Nazi Party politician. He served as Mayor of Hamburg for the majority of the Nazi period of government.

== Early years ==
Krogmann was born into one of Hamburg's old Huguenot families and married Emerentia Krogmann, who was noted for her antisemitic views. He came from a leading shipping family and inherited one of the city's leading maritime concerns as a result. Krogmann was a founder member of the Freundeskreis der Wirtschaft, an influential group of far right industrialists established in 1932 by Wilhelm Keppler. Unlike Keppler he was not a member of the Nazi Party until 1933, a fact that left him with little influence within the movement in later years.

== Mayor ==
He was appointed mayor of Hamburg on 8 March 1933 after being endorsed by a new coalition controlling the city made up of 8 Nazis, four members of the German National People's Party and one each from the German People's Party and the German State Party. His power was increased soon afterwards when the Nazis dissolved the Hamburg Parliament and awarded Krogmann power of decree. His appointment was ratified in no small degree because of his status as a member of one of Hamburg's pre-eminent mercantile families and as such it was hoped that he would appeal to the business community in the city, much of which was sceptical about the Nazis.

However, Krogmann had an early rival in the form of Reichstatthalter (Governor) Karl Kaufmann, and by 1936, he had been named Führer of Hamburg, denting Krogmann's power. Initially mayor, he had been given the stronger title Regierender Bürgermeister following the dissolution of the Hamburg Parliament. However, as Kaufmann's power grew so Krogmann's status diminished so as by 1937 he had been demoted to the lesser title of First Councillor of the Municipal Authority.

Despite his shaky status, Krogmann, a devotee of the writings of Richard Wagner, Paul de Lagarde and Houston Stewart Chamberlain, was a staunch believer in Nazism, especially its antisemitic aspects, and rigorously enforced anti-Jewish laws within Hamburg whilst publicly speaking in support of them elsewhere. He demonstrated this in particular in a speech he delivered to the Ostasiatischer Verein in 1935 in which he rounded on members of the business community who were critical of the racial policy of the Third Reich, whilst emphasising the "decisive importance" of the Jewish question.

== Post-war ==
After the Second World War he was interned in Bielefeld until being fined 10,000 Marks in August 1948 for membership of a criminal organisation and released. He withdrew from politics and worked initially in construction before operating his own wholesale lumber business, as well as publishing various editions of his diaries. He died in Hamburg in 1978.
