= Johann Otto Stammann =

Hamburg senator, lawyer and mayor (1835 -1909)

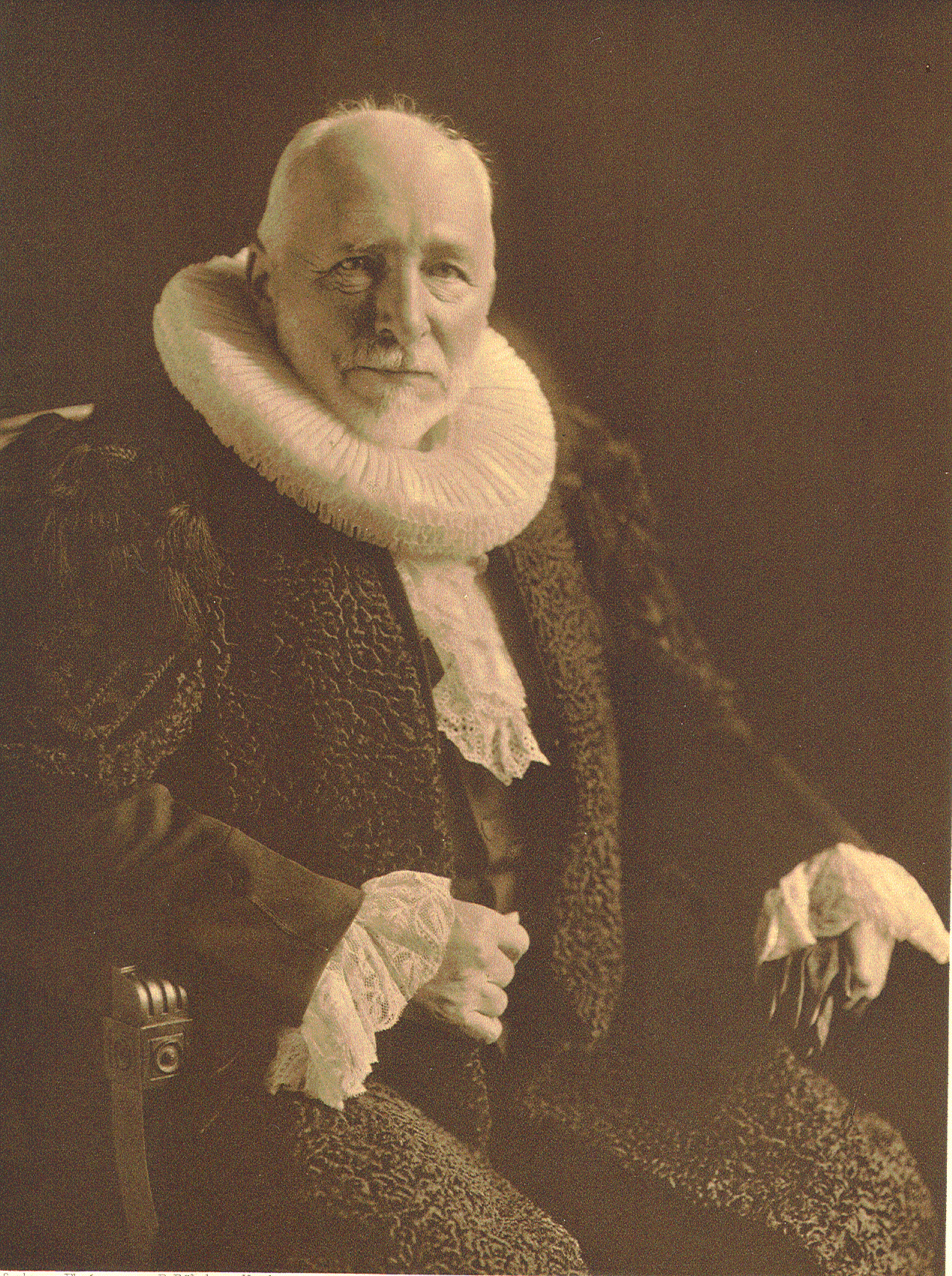
Image of him taken by Rudolf Dührkoop

Johann Otto Stammann (11 December 1835, Hamburg – 7 February 1909, Hamburg) was a Hamburg lawyer, senator and mayor.

== Family ==
Stammann's father was a doctor in Hamburg, and his uncle was the Hamburg architect Franz Georg Stammann. After studying law and receiving his doctorate in Heidelberg in 1857, he was enrolled as a lawyer in Hamburg on 23 April 1858. He was registered as a lawyer until 1886. In 1867, he married Bertha Schlüter, whose grandfather, David Schlüter, was mayor of Hamburg from 1835 to 1843. The lawyer Alfred Otto Stammann was his son.

On 22 September 1886, Stammann was elected to the Senate to replace the late Hermann Anthony Cornelius Weber. He was a member of this until his death in 1909. He worked for various authorities, such as the secondary school authority, the emigration department and the medical college. In 1900, he was police chief. In 1906, Stammann was elected second mayor, and the following year, he was elected first mayor of Hamburg. Because he became seriously ill at the end of 1908, he was not re-elected mayor in 1909, contrary to tradition.

His funeral led to a public dispute because, in accordance with the constitution, he was buried like a simple senator without a church ceremony; two senators were present. Many felt that since he had been a former mayor, he was entitled to a state funeral.
