= Hermann Anthony Cornelius Weber =

Hamburg senator and mayor

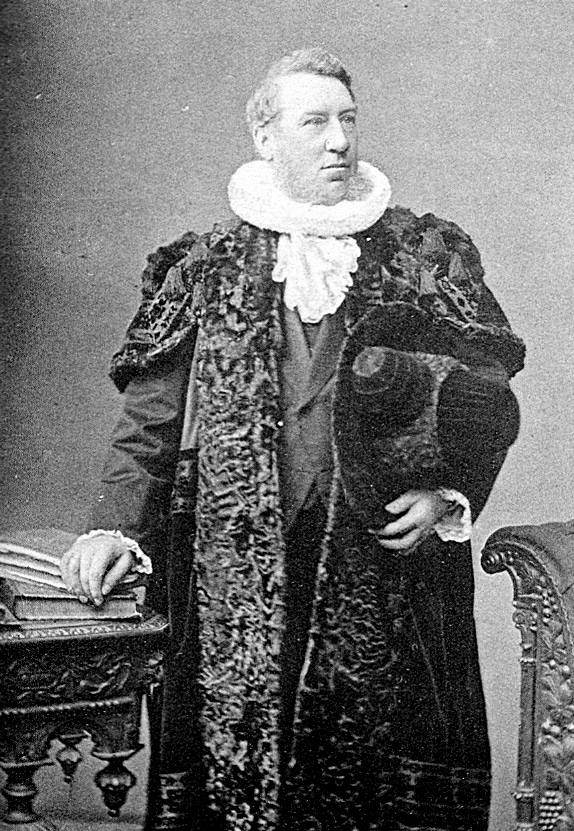
Image of Weber

Hermann Anthony Cornelius Weber (born December 17, 1822, in Hamburg; † September 9, 1886 in Othmarschen near Altona) was a Hamburg senator and mayor.

== Family ==
Weber's family originally came from Bielefeld. His father, David Friedrich Weber, together with Carl Woermann's father, founded the business Woermann und Weber in Bielefeld in 1811, which dealt with the linen trade. In 1814, he moved to Hamburg and separated from his partner, who also moved to Hamburg. David Friedrich Weber founded a company that traded successfully with South America. Hermann Anthony Cornelius Weber's sister married Carl Woermann. A younger brother was the merchant and consul Eduard Friedrich Weber.

== Life and politics ==
Hermann Anthony Cornelius Weber grew up in Hamburg and Lübeck. He attended the Katharineum in Lübeck until graduating from high school at Easter 1843 and studied law in Bonn, Berlin, and Heidelberg. After he received his doctorate in Heidelberg on December 19, 1846, jur. After receiving his doctorate, he settled in Hamburg as a lawyer. A short time later, in 1850, he married Luise (1830–1906), née Vorwerk, a daughter of the merchant Georg Friedrich Vorwerk. Weber was elected a commercial judge in 1859. In the same year, he also received a seat in the Hamburg City Council. On December 17, 1860, he was elected to the Hamburg Senate, where he remained a member until his death. As a senator, he was primarily responsible for the Hamburg judicial administration, which he significantly reformed. Along with Carl Friedrich Petersen and Gustav Heinrich Kirchenpauer. He was elected second mayor in 1876, an office he also held in 1878, 1881, and 1884. Weber served as the first mayor in 1879, 1882, and 1885. He had himself portrayed in official costume by Hermann Steinfurth. His successor was Johann Otto Stammann. Weber died in his house on Elbchaussee.
