= Government of Hamburg =

Division of government in Hamburg

The government of Hamburg is divided into executive, legislative and judicial branches. Hamburg is a city-state and municipality, and thus its governance deals with several details of both state and local community politics. It takes place in two ranks – a citywide and state administration (Senate of Hamburg), and a local rank for the boroughs. The head of the city-state's government is the First Mayor and President of the Senate. A ministry is called Behörde (office) and a state minister is a Senator in Hamburg. The legislature is the state parliament, called Hamburgische Bürgerschaft, and the judicial branch is composed of the state supreme court and other courts. The seat of the government is Hamburg Rathaus. The President of the Hamburg Parliament is the highest official person of the Free and Hanseatic City of Hamburg. This is a traditional difference to the other German states. The president is not allowed to exert any occupation of the executive.

Prior to 1871, Hamburg was a fully sovereign country, and its government a sovereign government. Upon joining the German Empire, the city-state retained partial sovereignty as a federal state. It was one of three republics within the German Empire until 1919, which meant that its First Mayor enjoyed the same rank in the Empire as the federal princes. Prior to the constitutional reforms in 1919, the hereditary grand burghers, or Hanseaten, had a legally privileged position and were the only ones eligible for election to the senate.

Sub-municipal administration is organised through the 7 boroughs of Hamburg.

== Political System ==
The basis of the political system are the Basic Law for the Federal Republic of Germany and the Constitution of the Free and Hanseatic city of Hamburg.

The Free and Hanseatic city of Hamburg is its own state in the Federal Republic of Germany. Hamburg is a republic, democratic welfare state and a constitutional state. At the same time Hamburg is a municipality, there is no separation between these two administrative tasks. The power to create a law is restricted by federal law.

There is a clear separation of powers.

=== Legislature ===
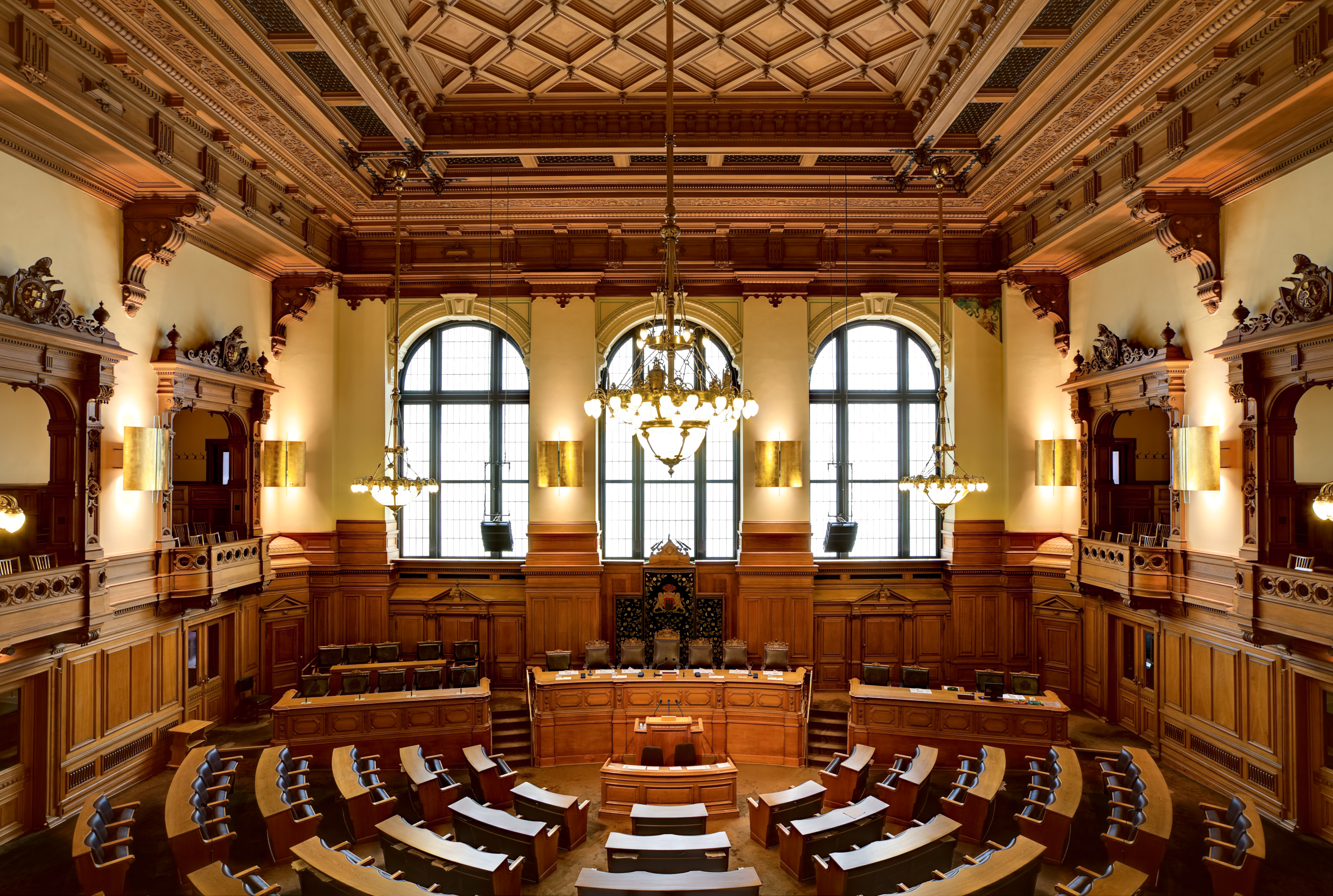
Room of the Hamburgische Bürgerschaft (Diet)

The power to create, amend and ratify laws (legislature) is given to the parliament. A plebiscite and a referendum is possible due to the Constitution of Hamburg. In other German states the parliament is called Landtag.

The President of the Hamburg Parliament is the highest official person of the Free and Hanseatic City of Hamburg.

The parliament is among other things responsible for the law, the election of the Erster Bürgermeister (First Mayor) for the election period and the control of the Senate (cabinet). The parliament is unicameral and the (currently) 123 deputies are elected in universal, direct, free, equal and secret elections every five years.

=== Executive ===
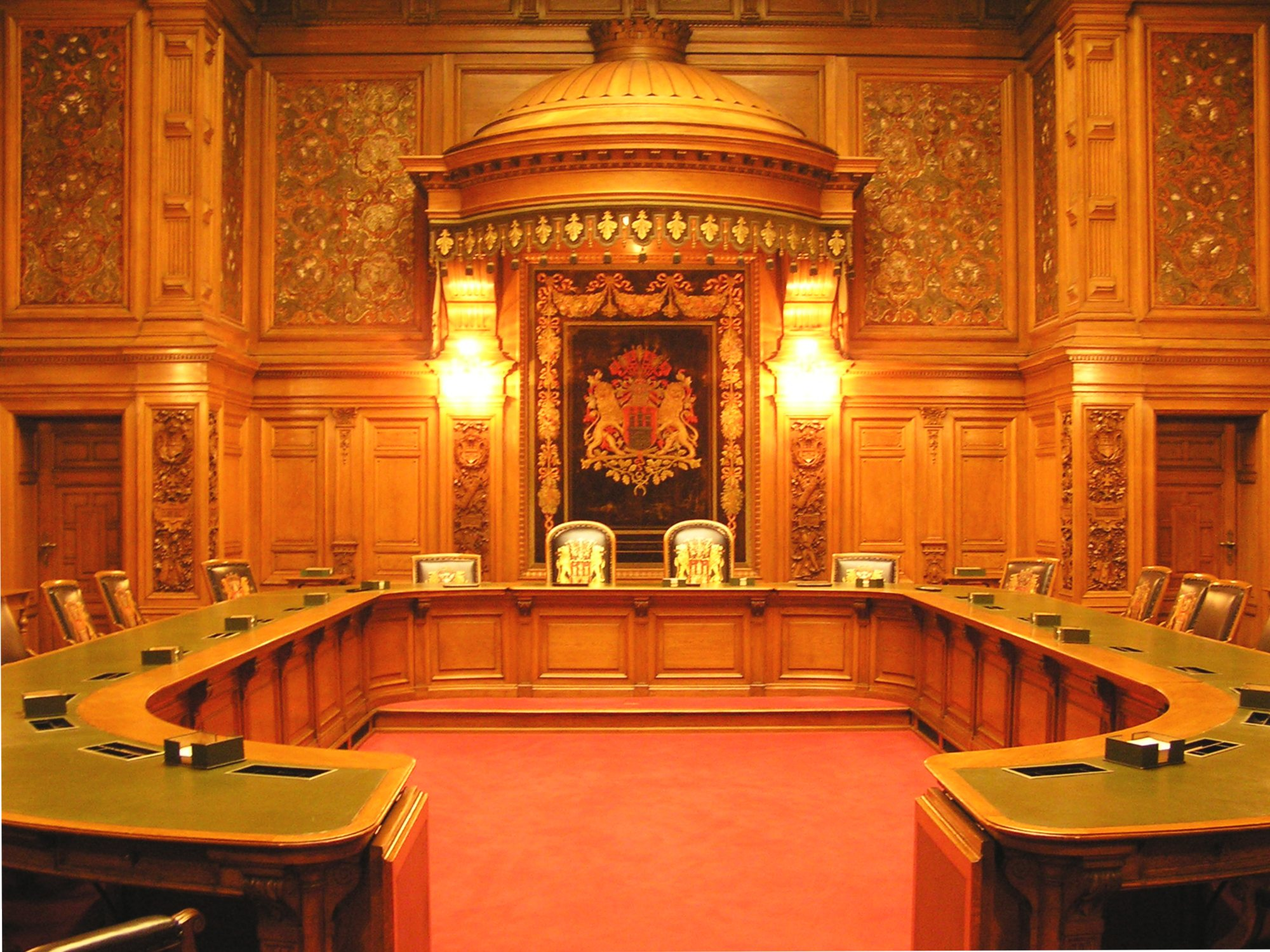
Room of the Senat

The executive is the Senat der Freien und Hansestadt Hamburg (Senate of Hamburg / cabinet). Its purpose is to enforce the laws. The senate is responsible for the day-to-day management and head of this branch is the First Mayor. The senate represents Hamburg to the federal government and other states or countries.

The Senat der Freien und Hansestadt Hamburg is formed by the first mayor of Hamburg, the Minister President and mayor of Hamburg. The deputy is the second mayor, who at the same time is also the senator of a ministry. The senate is permitted no more than 12 members by law. This law also regulates among other, the remuneration, pension, privilege to refuse to give evidence and the legal position of Hamburg judges. The senators get appointed by the first mayor and thereafter they need to get elected by Hamburg Parliament. The First Mayor forms the ministries, according to the coalition agreement of the ruling parties.

==== History ====
Until 1860 the government of Hamburg was called Rath or Rat (board/council), the members had been Ratsherrn (councillors) and Bürgermeister (Burgomaster). After a change of the Constitution of Hamburg in 1861 the government was called Hamburger Senat. The terms senate and senator are also sometimes used retrospectively when referring to the body and its members before 1861. During the Napoleonic Wars, when Hamburg was occupied and then annexed into France, the existing Hamburg council was replaced by a municipal council (conseil municipal or Munizipalrat), which existed from 1813 to 1814, when the previous constitution was reinstated.

Prior to the First World War the two mayors were elected for one-year-terms. Until 1997 the First Mayor was Primus inter pares among his colleagues in the Senate, by whom he was elected. Since then, he has been elected by the parliament and been able appoint and to dismiss other senators.

=== Judiciary ===
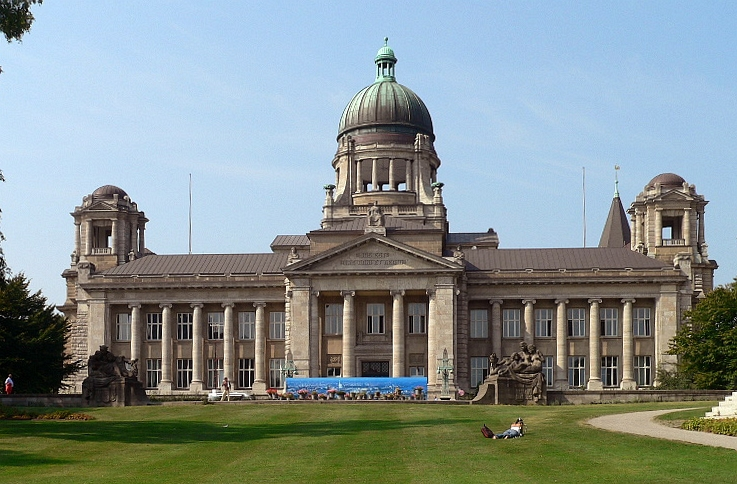
Supreme Court of Hamburg

Interpreting the law (Judiciary) is the task of the Constitutional Court of Hamburg (Hamburgisches Verfassungsgericht) and 17 other courts throughout Hamburg.

The supreme court consists of a president of the court and 8 judges. The president and 3 judges have to be lifetime judges in Hamburg. The Diet of Hamburg elect the judges for 6 years and they can only serve two terms in total. The schedule of responsibilities are based on the constitution of Hamburg (Art. 65) and the Gesetzes über das Hamburgische Verfassungsgericht (Law of the Constitutional Court of Hamburg) (§ 14).

The professional judges of the other courts are appointed by the senate according to a nomination of a committee.

== Ministries ==
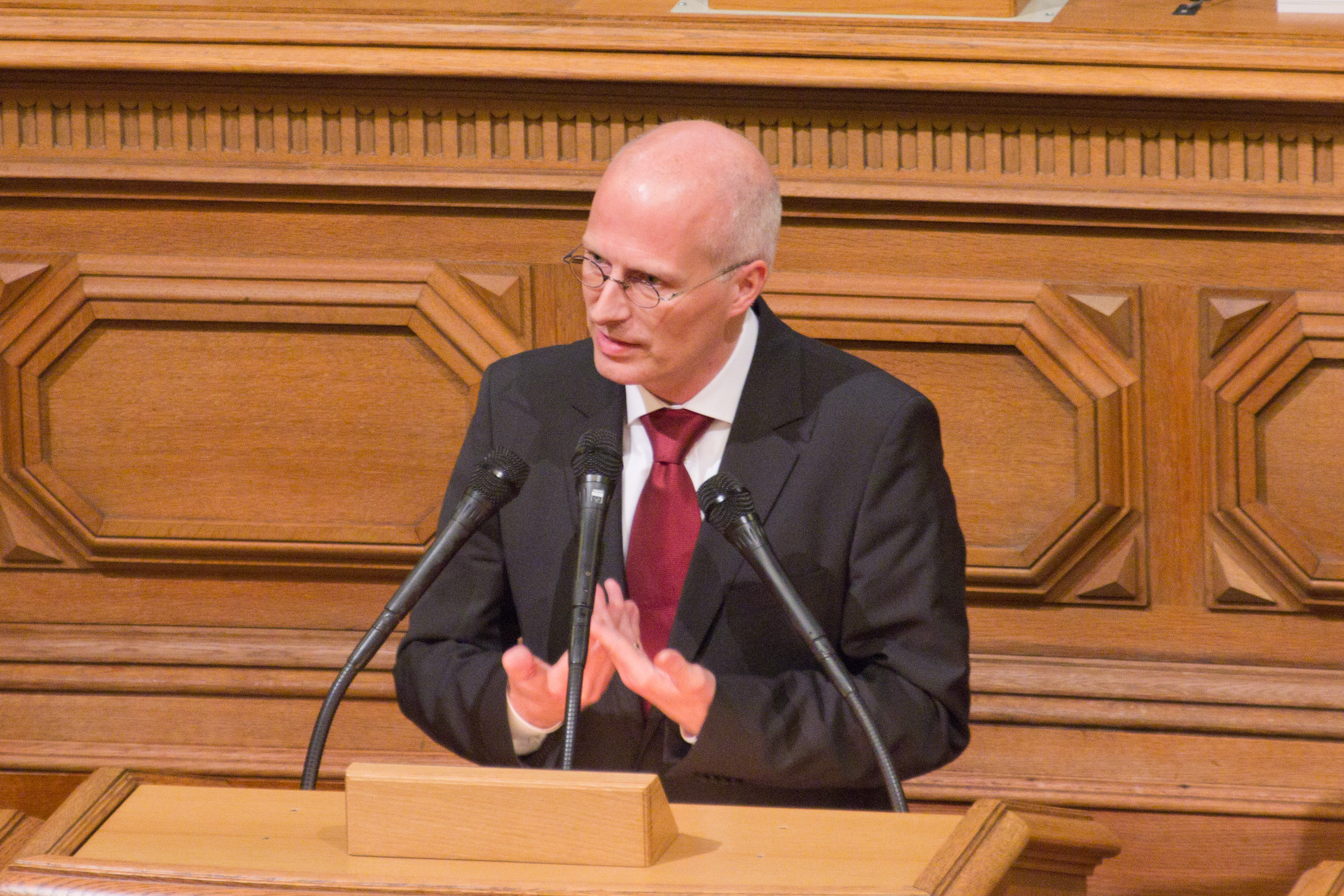
Peter Tschentscher in 2011

In 2018, there are eleven senators holding ministerial positions and the head of state, the First mayor. A senator is the presiding minister for a Behörde (translated: 'government agency' meaning here is more ministry).

State Chancellery

The State Chancellery (German: Senatskanzlei) coordinate the senate and support the mayor. The First Mayor is head in this government agency. In 2018, the First Mayor of Hamburg is Peter Tschentscher (SPD).

Ministry of Schools and Vocational Training

The Ministry of Schools and Vocational Training (German: Behörde für Schule und Berufsbildung) is responsible for managing the school system of Hamburg.

Ministry of Science, Research and Equal Opportunities

(German: Behörde für Wissenschaft, Forschung und Gleichstellung)

Ministry of the Interior and Sports

Among others the Behörde für Inneres und Sport is the oversight authority for the law enforcement agencies in Hamburg, the fire brigade, for disaster control and its units, the residents registration offices and the State Election Office. The Scientology Task Force (Arbeitsgruppe Scientology) got dissolved at the end of 2010.

Ministry of Finance

(German: Finanzbehörde)

Ministry of Economic Affairs, Transportation and Innovation

(German: Behörde für Wirtschaft, Verkehr und Innovation)

Ministry of Environment and Energy

(German: Behörde für Umwelt und Energie)

Ministry of Justice

The Ministry of Justice (German: Justizbehörde) is in charge of correctional facilities, the courts and the revision of laws. In 2018, Till Steffen (GAL) is the Minister of Justice of Hamburg.

Ministry of Health and Consumer Protection

(German: Behörde für Gesundheit und Verbraucherschutz)

Ministry of Culture, Sports and Media

On May 7, 2008, the former Ministry of Culture was renamed to the Ministry of Culture, Sports and Media (German: Behörde für Kultur, Sport und Medien), and is now, among other duties, responsible for tourism, the public record office of Hamburg, the office of the protection of historical monuments, and the memorial site for the Neuengamme concentration camp. In 2005 its annual budget was €212.7 million.

Ministry of Employment, Social Affairs, Family Affairs and Integration

(German: Behörde für Arbeit, Soziales, Familie und Integration)

Ministry of City Development and Housing

(German: Behörde für Stadtentwicklung und Wohnen)

== Law Enforcement ==
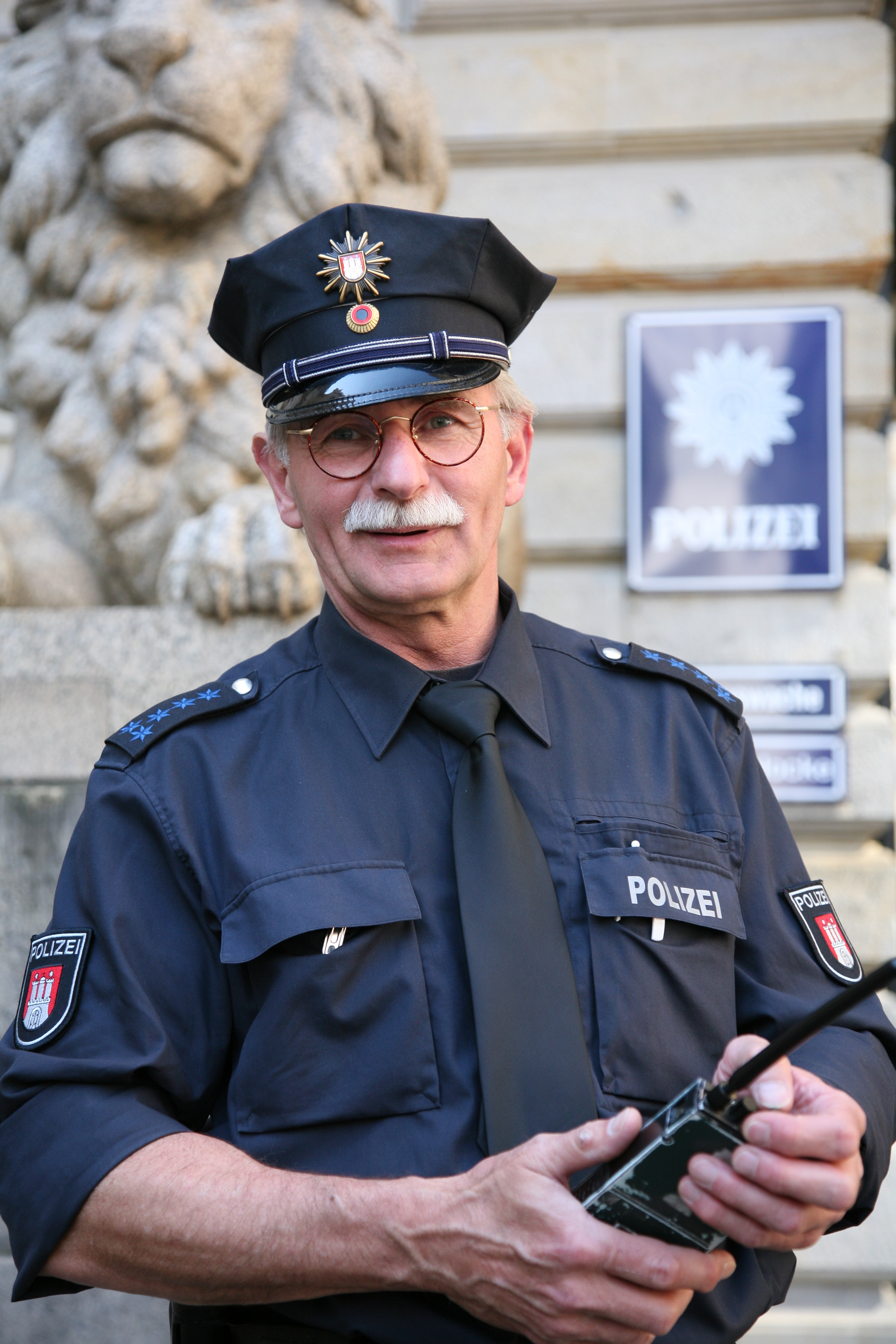
Police Staff Captain of the Hamburg police department on assignment at Hamburg city hall

Since law enforcement and police duties are partly in the responsibility of the German states, Hamburg has its own police force. This forces consists of the state police Polizei Hamburg, the State Criminal Police Office (German: Landeskriminalamt), the Criminal Investigation Services (Kriminalpolizei), the Water Police (Wasserschutzpolizei) controlling traffic in the port of Hamburg, the Stand-by Police (Bereitschaftspolizei), the Special Weapons and Tactics Unit (Spezialeinsatzkommando) and Mobile Surveillance Units (Mobiles Einsatzkommando). The State Office for the Protection of the Constitution of Hamburg (Landesamt für den Verfassungsschutz) is Hamburg's domestic intelligence agency. The Ministry of the Interior has the legal and technical oversight for the law enforcement agencies.

== Elections ==
Elections for the state parliament of Hamburg are held every five years, combined with the elections of the diet of the boroughs (Bezirksversammlungen). Since 2013, also minors who are 16 or older are allowed to vote for any elections in Hamburg.

=== Political Parties ===
The main political parties in Hamburg are the Christian Democratic Union (represented by the CDU Hamburg), the Social Democratic Party, Alliance 90/The Greens, The Left, the Free Democratic Party, and the Alternative for Germany (represented by the AfD Hamburg).

Name (English)	Name (German)	Abbr.	Ideology	Position	International organizations	Votes (2020)	Seats in Hamburgische Bürgerschaft	Notes
Social Democratic Party	Sozialdemokratische Partei Deutschlands	SPD	Social democracy	centre-left	Progressive Alliance and Socialist International (observer)	39,2%	53	
Christian Democratic Union	Christlich Demokratische Union	CDU	Christian democracy	centre-right	Centrist Democrat International and International Democrat Union	11,2%	15	
Alliance '90/The Greens	Bündnis 90 / Die Grünen (GAL)		Green Politics	centre-left	Global Greens	24,2%	33	merger of Die Grünen and Bündnis 90
Free Democratic Party	Freie Demokratische Partei	FDP	Liberalism	centre	Liberal International	4,9%	0	2 non-attached FDP members
The Left	Die Linke		Socialism; Eurocommunism	left-wing	Party of the European Left	9,1%	13	merger of The Left Party.PDS and WASG
Alternative for Germany	Alternative für Deutschland	AfD	Right-wing populism	far-right	Identity and Democracy	5,3%	6	

The Statt Party is a minor political party which was founded in 1993. The party was elected to the Hamburg Parliament in the Hamburg state election of 1993. The governing SPD and the new Statt Party formed a coalition to rule until 1997, when the party lost all seats.

The Party for a Rule of Law Offensive (Partei Rechtsstaatlicher Offensive – Offensive D) was a right-wing populist party which was represented in the Hamburg Parliament from 2001 until 2004, receiving 19.4% of votes. It is now defunct.

== Honours and Awards ==
The highest honour awarded by the Free and Hanseatic City of Hamburg is honorary citizenship (Ehrenbürgerrecht). It is officially given by the senate, although the parliament must also confirm the senate's nominee. Honorary citizenship is comparable to the Freedom of the City, an honour awarded by many nations.

The Golden Book consists of the signatures of especially honoured guests of Hamburg. The book, in actuality, is a golden leather-bound box and doesn't have fixed sheets. It was a gift of the family of the First Mayor Carl Friedrich Petersen. In 1937 the German leader Adolf Hitler signed the book before giving a public speech in Hamburg. During denazification Hitler's sheet, as well as those of other Nazis, was removed from the book. The only Nazi signature remaining is from Reich Minister of Propaganda Joseph Goebbels, due to the fact that he wrote on the same sheet as the former German president Paul von Hindenburg. The Dalai Lama signed the Golden Book during his 5th visit to Hamburg in February 2007.

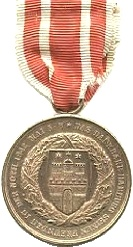
Fire medal from 1843

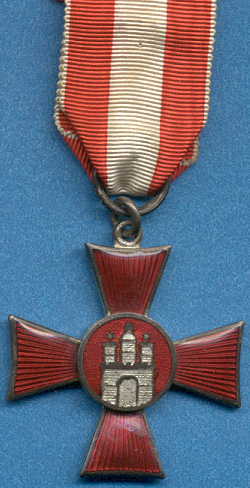
Hanseatic Cross

=== Decorations ===
Historically, Hamburg's citizens have not been legally allowed to receive decorations—only medals or medallions. When it was first enacted in the 13th century, the law applied only to members of the senate and Hamburg's judges. It was, however, later extended to all citizens by the senate. One of the few citizens of a Hanseatic city to receive a decoration was the entrepreneur Alwin Münchmeyer, who later stated that this were his "falls of mankind". Helmut Schmidt, former Hamburg Senator of the Interior and German Chancellor, declined several times to accept the Federal Cross of Merit, stating that he had been a Hamburg senator and, according to Hanseatic tradition, was not permitted to wear decorations.

In 1843 a fire medal was awarded to the volunteer firefighters who assisted Hamburg during the great fire that engulfed the city from 5 May 1842 until 8 May. In total 4,858 medals were awarded. The inscription on the medal states "Das Dankbare Hamburg Seinen Freunden In Der Noth" ("The grateful Hamburg in need to its friends").

During World War I the Hanseatic Cross (German: Hanseatenkreuz) was awarded by the three Hanseatic Cities of Bremen, Hamburg and Lübeck, who were member states of the German Empire. Each city-state established its own version of the cross, but the design and award criteria were similar for each. There were approximately 50,000 awards of the Hanseatic Cross of Hamburg.

=== Medallions ===
In 2007 the Herbert Weichmann medallion, named for the First Mayor Herbert Weichmann (in office 1965 – 1971), was granted for the first time by the city of Hamburg, honoring "those—both Jewish and non-Jewish—who have contributed to Jewish life in Germany". Its first recipients were Paul Spiegel (posthumous), who was a member of the executive committee of the Central Council of Jews in Germany, and Hinrich Reemtsma, whose foundation contributed €500,000 to the renovation of an old Talmud Torah school into a Jewish community centre.

== See Also ==
- Boroughs and quarters of Hamburg
- List of diplomatic missions in Hamburg

== Notes ==
=== References ===
- Constitution of the Free and Hanseatic city of Hamburg (in German)
