= Friedrich Sthamer =

German lawyer

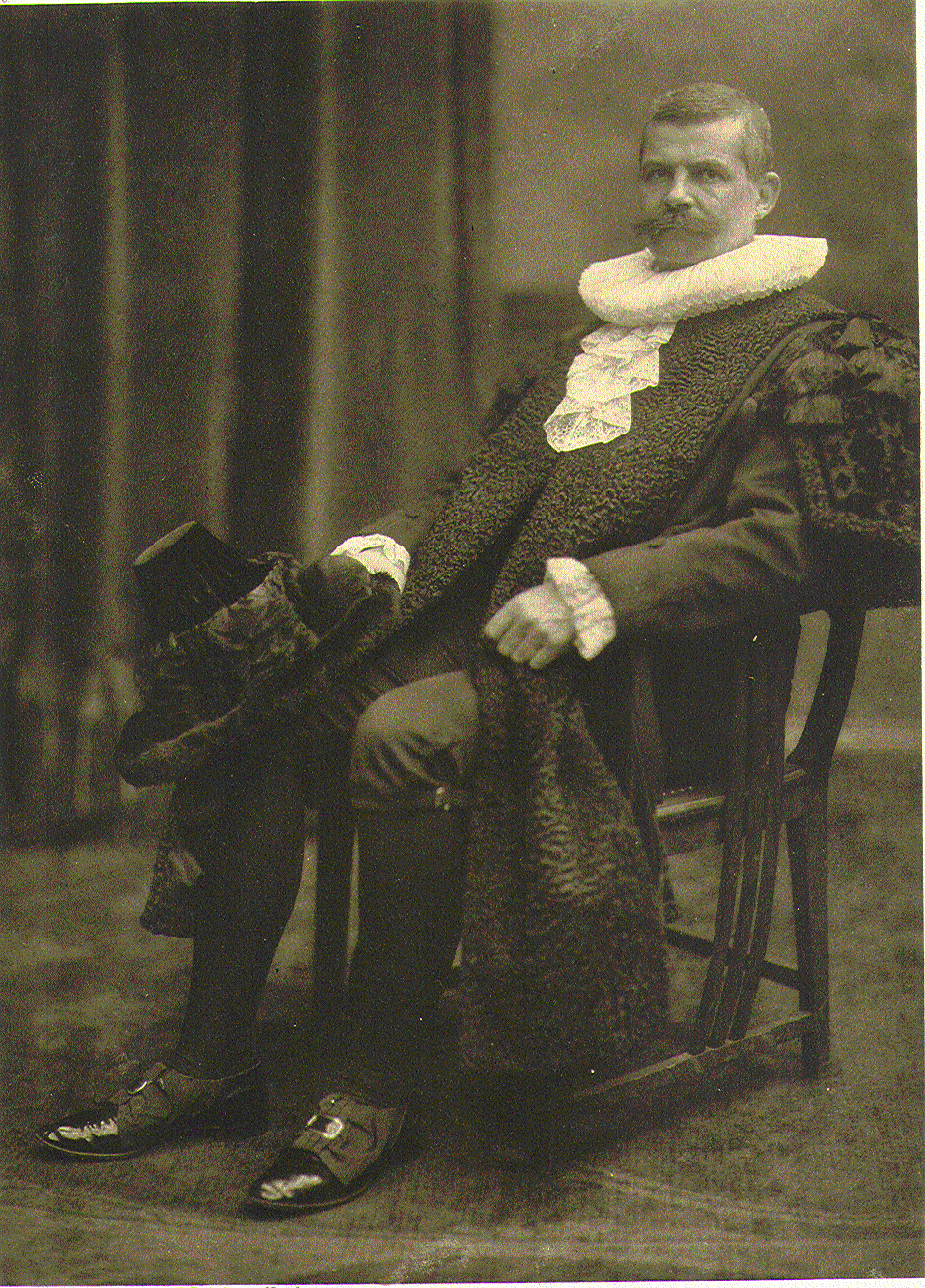
- Friedrich Sthamer, photograph by Rudolf Dührkoop in 1905

First Mayor of Hamburg and President of the Hamburg Senate
- In office January 1920 – February 1920
- Preceded by: Werner von Melle
- Succeeded by: Arnold Diestel

German Ambassador to the United Kingdom
- In office 1920–1930
- Preceded by: Karl Max von Lichnowsky
- Succeeded by: Konstantin von Neurath

Personal details
- Born: 24 November 1856 Groß Weeden
- Died: 29 June 1931 (aged 74) Ratzeburg
- Education: Ruperto Carola; Lipsiensis; Georgia Augusta
- Occupation: Lawyer

Gustav Friedrich Carl Johann Sthamer (24 November 1856 – 29 June 1931) was a German lawyer, First Mayor of Hamburg, and ambassador.

Sthamer was born on 24 November 1856 in Groß Weeden, part of the municipality Rondeshagen. He studied law at the universities of Heidelberg, Leipzig, and Göttingen. In 1879, Sthamer became a lawyer in Hamburg, and in 1892, chairman of Hamburg's bar association. 1901–1904, Sthamer was member of the Hamburg Parliament, and elected to the Senate of Hamburg in 1904. During the First World War, Sthamer was president of the civil government of the occupied Antwerp.

In 1919, Sthamer was elected to the Senate of Hamburg and became First Mayor of Hamburg in 1920. After a short term in office, Sthamer resigned because he was appointed as German ambassador to the United Kingdom.

Sthamer died on 29 June 1931.
