= Johanneum Gymnasium =

Academic School of the Johanneum
- Gelehrtenschule des Johanneums

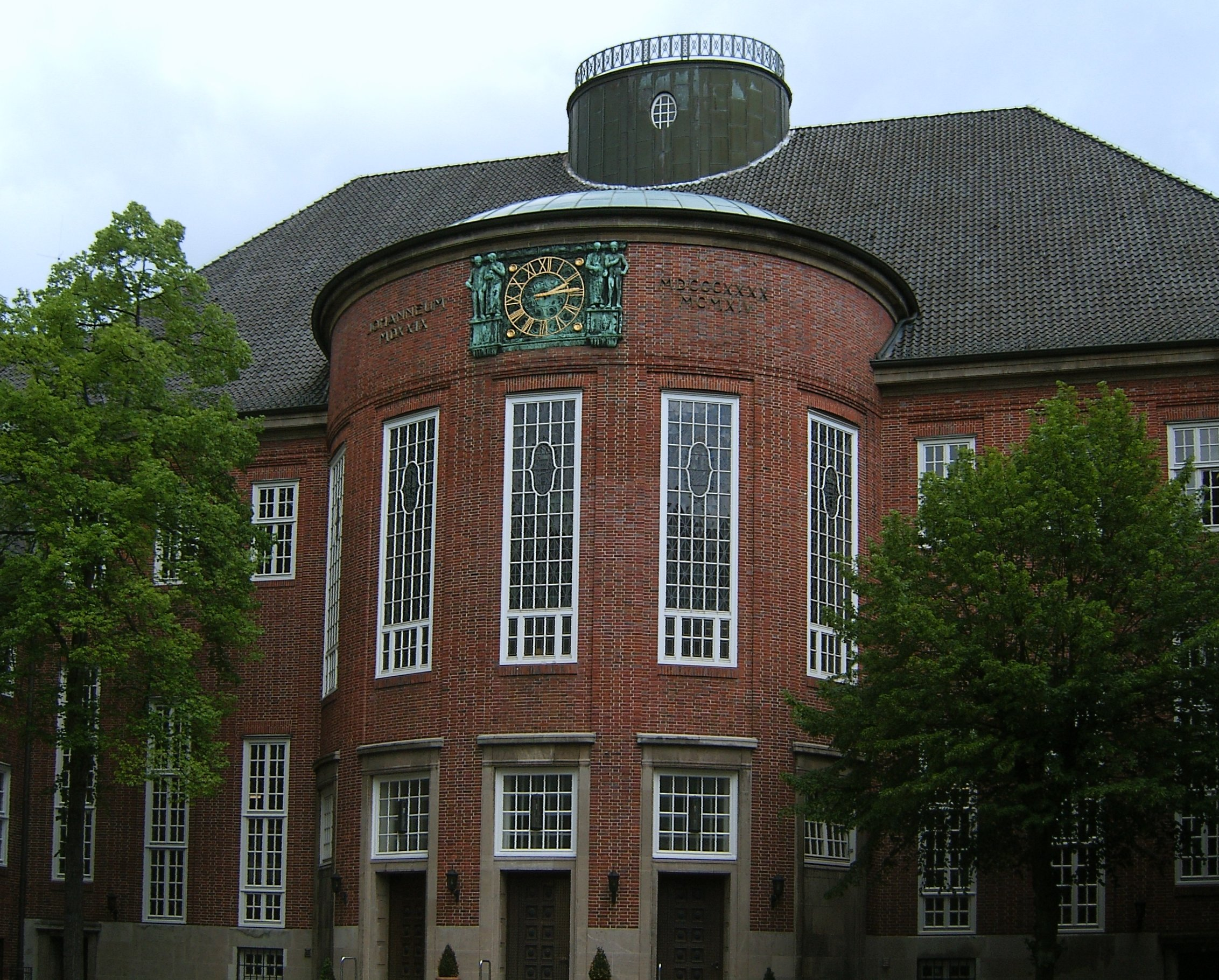

Location
- Maria-Louisen-Straße 114; Hamburg 22301; Germany; 53°35′23″N 10°0′23″E

Information
- Established: 1529; 497 years ago
- Principal: Inken Hose
- Staff: 60
- Enrollment: 800
- Website: www.johanneum-hamburg.de

The Gelehrtenschule des Johanneums (transl. Academic School of the Johanneum, short: Johanneum) is a Gymnasium in Hamburg, Germany. It is Hamburg's oldest school and was founded in 1529 by Johannes Bugenhagen. The school's focus is on the teaching of Latin and Ancient Greek. The school is operated and financed by the city of Hamburg.

The school is twinned with the two London schools Latymer Upper School and Godolphin and Latymer School.

In Jules Verne's novel Journey to the Centre of the Earth, one of the main characters, Otto Lidenbrock, is a professor at the Johanneum.

== History ==
The Johanneum was founded by Johannes Bugenhagen, the spiritual representative of the reformer Martin Luther. In 1528, he came to Hamburg to give the city an Evangelical Lutheran church order, the Erbarn Stadt Hamborch Christlike Ordeninge. On May 24, 1529, the Johanneum first opened its doors in the building of the secularized old St. Johannis monastery, on the site of today's Rathausmarkt as the "Latinsche Schole". The actual school rooms were in half-timbered buildings in the inner courtyard of the monastery. In the beginning, the Johanneum was a school for prospective academics with a focus on Latin and ancient Greek. Later, a second citizens' school branch was added for the education of sons of merchants and traders, which was later split off as a separate "Realgymnasium des Johanneums".

The patriciate of the city republic of Hamburg was educated at the Johanneum following humanist traditions. Important scholars and authors of the early Enlightenment worked here, including Hermann Samuel Reimarus, Barthold Heinrich Brockes, Michael Richey, and Johann Albert Fabricius. Georg Philipp Telemann and Carl Philipp Emanuel Bach were cantors here, and this established a lasting tradition and reputation.

=== New building at the Speersort ===
In 1826, a new school building was ordered but initially not implemented due to a lack of funds. Construction took place from 1838 to 1840 at the Speersort location, the site of Hamburg's old cathedral which had been demolished in 1806. This is where the Hammaburg stood, the nucleus of the settlement that was to become the city of Hamburg. The medieval St Johannis monastery was demolished at the same time. The imposing classicist new building, designed by Carl Ludwig Wimmel (1786–1845) and Franz Gustav Forsmann (1795–1878), consisted of a main middle building and two wing structures that were connected through arcades facing Domstrasse, where the main entrance was located. The building was based on competing designs by Alexis de Chateauneuf (1799–1853) and Carl Ludwig Wimmel. The building survived the Great Fire of 1842, which caused numerous buildings nearby to go up in flames, including St Petri church.

The Speersort building housed the two schools (Gelehrtenschule and Realgymnasium) as well as a library that later was to become the city's public university library (the Staats- und Universitätsbibliothek) and a higher school for academics ("Akademisches Gymnasium").

=== New Maria-Louisen-Straße building ===
In 1914, the Johanneum moved into what is today the building complex designed by Fritz Schumacher on Maria-Louisen-Strasse, while the old Speersort building was used entirely by Hamburg's public university library at the time. The Speersort building was largely destroyed in the bombing raids on Hamburg in 1943; the remains (including a surviving part of the arcades) were removed for widening the streets in 1955 (the foundations were uncovered again in 2005 during archaeological excavations on the former cathedral square). The entire complex of the Johanneum in Maria-Louisen-Strasse with the Schumacher buildings has been a listed building since 1979. The Bugenhagen memorial created by Engelbert Peiffer in the courtyard has been a listed building since 1958.

In 1948, three years after the end of the Second World War, a group of students from the Johanneum visited London. Frederick Wilkinson, the headteacher of Latymer Upper School, believed that only through young people getting to know one another could understanding, reconciliation, and thus lasting peace be achieved in Europe. In this spirit, he initiated the student exchange that has taken place every year since then, and which has been extended to other schools and countries.

It has an important historical library that is also open to research.

Individual girls in the upper classes were admitted earlier, but it was not until 1977 that the first girls were enrolled in sexta.

=== Forum Johanneum ===
The Johanneum has received a large new building through a multi-million-euro donation from a patron. It is a three-story building with a total area of 2200 square meters, which contains art and music rooms, a cafeteria, a theater rehearsal room, and a sports hall. The Forum Johanneum was officially opened on May 24, 2007.

On the south facade, there is an inscription in ancient Greek. The inscription translates to "All people naturally seek knowledge" and is a quote from Aristotle's Metaphysics.

== The Stufenhaus ==
In 2016, the Stufenhaus, a three-story building with a total area of 1460 square meters, replaced eight provisional container classrooms. It houses twelve classrooms and five differentiation rooms.

The Stufenhaus ("stepped house") alludes to the terraces of the large outside staircase, which are lined with aphorisms in various languages and mathematical formulas. The order of the aphorisms symbolizes the course of languages taught in school.

== Hödhütte ==
Hödhütte is the country house of the Gelehrtenschule des Johanneums. Leased by the school since 1970, it is located in the Radstädter Tauern, Austria. Living conditions are very simple, with only one tap, communal bunks, and no TV or telephone; mobile phones are banned. All pupils must spend 11 days at Hödhütte during their seventh year to build community spirit, strengthen character, and learn to ski.

Students from all years have the opportunity to spend their holidays in Hödhütte.

== Visiting historical sites ==
The school believes that every student should have the opportunity to experience the sites of classical antiquity at first hand. The Verein zur Förderung von Schulreisen an klassische Stätten e.V. was formed to fund this activity.

== Bibliotheca Johannei ==
The library of the school is called Bibliotheca Johannei, with 55,000 books written in Latin, Ancient Greek, English, French, Italian and German. The library has the first editions of many of the milestones of European literature, the oldest book being a Latin Bible from 1491.

== Alumni society ==
The school has an alumni society called Verein ehemaliger Schüler der Gelehrtenschule des Johanneums zu Hamburg e.V. with 1,300 members providing money for school activities.

== Former teachers ==
Former teachers of the school include:

- Johannes Classen (Director / Head teacher 1864–1874)
- Hermann Alexander Diels
- Johann Gottfried Gurlitt
- Richard Hoche (Director / Head teacher 1874–1887)
- Johann Hübner
- Adolf Kiessling
- Ernst Gottlob Köstlin
- Hermann Cäsar Hannibal Schubert
- Gottlob Reinhold Sievers
- Georg Philipp Telemann (Cantor (church))
- Carl Philipp Emanuel Bach (Cantor (church))
- Christian Friedrich Gottlieb Schwenke (Director of Church Music and Cantor)

== Former pupils ==
- Marlo von Tresckow
- Gant von Tresckow
- Leon Leue
- Carlotta Kenkel
- Clara Brockhaus
- Emilia Enders
- Cougar von Tresckow
- Adrian Mahnke
- Henry Schrader
- Arthur Paas
- Christian Wilhelm Alers
- Wilhelm Amsinck
- Eduard Arning
- Luis Rothenberg
- Heinrich Barth
- Johann Bernhard Basedow
- Marcus Birkenkrahe
- "Büdi" Christian Blunck
- Peter van Bohlen
- Justus Brinckmann
- Barthold Heinrich Brockes
- Johann Heinrich Burchard
- Johannes Classen
- Diedrich Diederichsen
- Hans Driesch
- Johann Franz Encke
- Barthold Feind
- Gottfried Forck
- Hinnerk Fock
- Ludwig Gerling
- Ralph Giordano
- Martin Haller
- Tobias Hauke
- Friedrich Hebbel
- Gerrit Heesemann
- Heinrich Hertz
- Gustav Ludwig Hertz
- Gerhard Herzberg
- Johann Michael Hudtwalcker
- Hans Jauch
- Walter Jens
- Peter Katzenstein
- Harry Graf Kessler
- Bernhard Klefeker
- Johann Carl Knauth
- Franz Knoop
- Theodor von Kobbe
- Volker Lechtenbrink
- Eduard Lohse
- John Lund
- Alfred Mann
- Walter Matthaei
- Max Mendel
- Eduard Meyer
- Daniel Gotthilf Moldenhawer
- Johann Georg Mönckeberg
- August Johann Wilhelm Neander
- Hans Georg Niemeyer
- Max Nonne
- Hans Erich Nossack
- Adolf Overweg
- Fredrik Pacius
- Carl Friedrich Petersen
- Wolfgang Petersen
- Christoph Ploß
- Martin Eduard Warner Poelchau
- Robert Wichard Pohl
- Wolfgang Ratke
- Hermann Samuel Reimarus
- Johann Wilhelm Rautenberg
- Grigorij Richters
- Johann Rist
- Erwin Rohde
- Albrecht Roscher
- Thomas G. Rosenmeyer
- Philipp Otto Runge
- Hjalmar Schacht
- Heinrich Gottlieb Schellhaffer
- Leif Schrader
- Carl August Schröder
- Emil Gottlieb Schuback
- Friedemann Schulz von Thun
- Ulrich Seelemann
- Gottfried Semper
- Kurt Sieveking
- Eduard Wilhelm Sievers
- Wilhelm Sievers
- Morris Simmonds
- Bruno Streckenbach
- Georg Michael Telemann
- Bernhard Tollens
- Karl Ulmer
- Paul Gerson Unna
- Werner von Melle
- Aby Warburg
- Friedrich Wasmann
- Christian Wegner
- Dietrich Wersich
- Wilhelm Heinrich Westphal
- Johann Hinrich Wichern
- Henrik Wiese
- Wolfgang Zeidler
- Paultheo von Zezschwitz
- Axel Zwingenberger

== See also ==
- Wilhelm-Gymnasium (Hamburg)
