= 869 Mellena =

Main-belt asteroid

Discovery
- Discovered by: R. Schorr
- Discovery site: Bergedorf Obs.
- Discovery date: 9 May 1917

Designations
- Named after: Werner von Melle (mayor of Hamburg)
- Alternative designations: A917 JB · 1931 RC; 1944 OB · 1952 DL_{2} 1917 BV
- Minor planet category: main-belt · (middle) background

Orbital characteristics
- Epoch 31 May 2020 (JD 2459000.5)
- Uncertainty parameter 0
- Observation arc: 102.66 yr (37,496 d)
- Aphelion: 3.2807 AU
- Perihelion: 2.0966 AU
- Semi-major axis: 2.6887 AU
- Eccentricity: 0.2202
- Orbital period (sidereal): 4.41 yr (1,610 d)
- Mean anomaly: 90.376°
- Mean motion: 0° 13^{m} 24.96^{s} / day
- Inclination: 7.8385°
- Longitude of ascending node: 154.88°
- Argument of perihelion: 107.09°

Physical characteristics
- Mean diameter: 18.45±0.32 km; 18.52±0.8 km; 21.193±0.090 km
- Synodic rotation period: 6.5155±0.0005 h
- Geometric albedo: 0.0565±0.005; 0.057±0.022; 0.058±0.002
- Spectral type: C (S3OS2); C (SDSS-MOC)
- Absolute magnitude (H): 11.9

869 Mellena (prov. designation: A917 JB or 1917 BV) is a dark background asteroid from the central region of the asteroid belt. It was discovered on 9 May 1917, by astronomer Richard Schorr at the Bergedorf Observatory in Hamburg. The carbonaceous C-type asteroid has a shorter than average rotation period of 6.5 hours and measures approximately 19 kilometers (12 miles) in diameter. It was named after Werner von Melle (1853–1937), mayor of Hamburg, who founded the discovering observatory.

== Orbit and classification ==
Mellena is a non-family asteroid of the main belt's background population when applying the hierarchical clustering method to its proper orbital elements. It orbits the Sun in the central asteroid belt at a distance of 2.1–3.3 AU once every 4 years and 5 months (1,610 days; semi-major axis of 2.69 AU). Its orbit has an eccentricity of 0.22 and an inclination of 8° with respect to the ecliptic.

== Discovery ==
Mellena was discovered by German astronomer Richard Schorr at the Bergedorf Observatory in Hamburg on 9 May 1917. On the following night, it was independently discovered by Max Wolf at Heidelberg Observatory on 10 May 1917. The Minor Planet Center, however, only credits the first discoverer. Schorr only discovered one more asteroid, 1240 Centenaria, and was honored with the naming of Mars-crosser 1235 Schorria, discovered by Wolf. Mellena's observation arc begins at Algiers Observatory in Northern Africa on 26 March 1930, almost 13 years after its official discovery observation at Bergedorf.

== Naming ==
This minor planet was named after Werner von Melle (1853–1937), who was the mayor of Hamburg, Germany, in 1915 and during 1918–1919. He promoted the establishment of the University of Hamburg and founded the Bergedorf–Hamburg Observatory where this minor planet was discovered. The naming was also mentioned in The Names of the Minor Planets by Paul Herget in 1955 (H 85).

== Physical characteristics ==
In both the Tholen- and SMASS-like taxonomy of the Small Solar System Objects Spectroscopic Survey (S3OS2) as well as in the SDSS-based taxonomy, Mellena is a common, carbonaceous C-type asteroid.

=== Rotation period ===
In May 2010, a rotational lightcurve of Mellena was obtained from photometric observations by Robert Stephens at the Santana (646) and GMARS (G79) observatories in California. Lightcurve analysis gave a well-defined rotation period of 6.5155±0.0005 hours with a brightness variation of 0.27±0.03 magnitude (U=3). Subsequent observations were taken by Andrea Ferrero at the Bigmuskie Observatory (B88) in Mombercelli, Italy (U=2), and Larry Owings at the Barnes Ridge Observatory in California in June 2010 (U=3), as well as by Albino Carbognani Astronomical at the OAVdA Observatory (B04) in July 2010 (U=3−). These observations gave a concurring period of (6.510±0.003), (6.510±0.001) and (6.515±0.001) hours with an amplitude of (0.25±0.02), (0.20±0.02) and (0.26±0.03) magnitude, respectively.

=== Diameter and albedo ===
According to the surveys carried out by the Japanese Akari satellite, the Infrared Astronomical Satellite IRAS, and the NEOWISE mission of NASA's Wide-field Infrared Survey Explorer (WISE), Mellena measures (18.45±0.32), (18.52±0.8) and (21.193±0.090) kilometers in diameter and its surface has an albedo of (0.058±0.002), (0.0565±0.005) and (0.057±0.022), respectively. The Collaborative Asteroid Lightcurve Link derives an albedo of 0.0884 and a diameter of 18.64 kilometers based on an absolute magnitude of 11.9. Alternative mean diameter measurements published by the WISE team include (15.23±3.47 km), (16.39±3.30 km), (17.77±0.46 km) and (21.953±0.153 km) with corresponding albedos of (0.12±0.17), (0.09±0.04), (0.065±0.009) and (0.0377±0.0020).
