= Telemann (disambiguation) =

Georg Philipp Telemann (1681–1767) was a German composer.

Telemann may also refer to:

- Georg Michael Telemann (1748–1831), German composer and theologian
- Walter Telemann (1882–1941), German radiologist and surgeon
- 4246 Telemann, an asteroid

== See also ==
- Teleman
