= Hoche (disambiguation) =

Hoche may refer to:

== People ==
- Alfred Hoche (1865–1943), German psychiatrist
- Lazare Hoche (1768–1797), French general
- Richard Hoche (1834–1906), German classical scholar and head teacher

== Other ==
- Hoche station, a Paris Metro station
- French ironclad Hoche, a French Navy battleship in service from 1890 to 1908
- Lycée Hoche, a secondary school in Versailles, France
