= Groß Weeden =

Groß Weeden is a district of the municipality Rondeshagen in Schleswig-Holstein, Germany.
