= Werner von Melle =

German mayor, senator and jurist

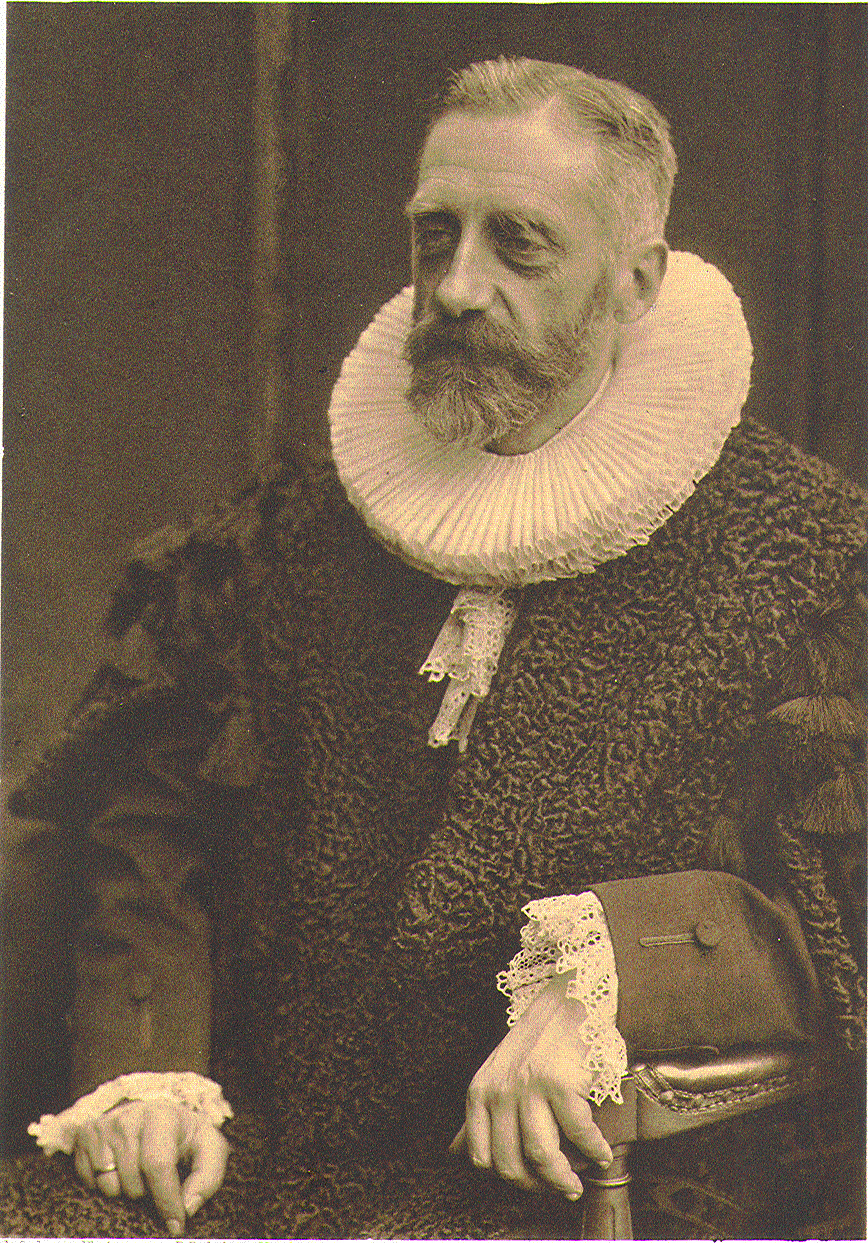
- Werner von Melle in Hamburg senator's ornate, 1905; by Rudolf Dührkoop

Second Mayor of Hamburg
- In office 1 January 1914 – 31 December 1914
- Preceded by: Max Predöhl
- Succeeded by: August Schröder
- In office 1 January 1917 – 12 November 1917
- Preceded by: Max Predöhl
- Succeeded by: August Schröder

First Mayor of Hamburg and President of the Hamburg Senate
- In office 1 January 1915 – 31 December 1915
- Preceded by: Max Predöhl
- Succeeded by: August Schröder
- In office 1 January 1918 – 12 November 1918
- Preceded by: Max Predöhl
- Succeeded by: Soldiers' and Workers' Council
- In office (acting only); 18 November 1918 – 27 March 1919
- Preceded by: Soldiers' and Workers' Council
- Succeeded by: himself (reëlected)
- In office 31 March 1919 – 31 December 1919
- Preceded by: himself (reëlected)
- Succeeded by: Friedrich Sthamer

Personal details
- Born: 18 October 1853 Hamburg
- Died: 18 February 1937 (aged 83) Hamburg
- Party: Nonpartisan
- Education: Georgia Augusta

Werner von Melle (18 October 1853 – 18 February 1937) was a mayor and senator of Hamburg, as well as a jurist. Melle, who held multiple doctorates, also served on the first board of trustees for the Hamburg Scientific Foundation.

== Family ==
Melle was the son of Emil von Melle, a merchant who later became a senator of Hamburg and eventually sat in the senate of the North German Confederation. Melle's mother, Maria Geffcken, whom his father married in 1850, was the daughter of Senator Henry Geffcken. After marrying Emmy Kaemmerer, the daughter of Georg Heinrich Kaemmerer, a businessman and member of the Hamburg Parliament, in 1880, Melle fathered three daughters.

== Career ==
Melle studied law at the Georgia Augusta University in Göttingen and became a lawyer in Hamburg in 1876, also writing articles for the newspaper Hamburgischer Correspondent. In 1886, he became a full-time journalist with Hamburger Nachrichten. In 1891 he joined the executive board of Hamburg's senior school authority (Oberschulbehörde) and was appointed syndic attorney of the city-state of Hamburg.

In 1900 the Hamburg Parliament elected Melle as fellow senator into the Senate of Hamburg, the executive government of the city-state. Although elected for a life-term, he remained senator only until 1921. For the calendar years 1914 and 1917 the fellow senators elected him deputy mayor (Second Mayor of Hamburg). Then the fellow senators elected him First Mayor of Hamburg, thus head of state and of government (president of the senate) – though under the auspices of a primus inter pares regulation – for the full calendar years 1915, 1918 and for the term 31 March to 31 December 1919.

On 12 November 1918 the Hamburg revolutionary Soldiers' and Workers' Council deposed the Senate of Hamburg, but reappointed the senators as acting administration only on 18 November. In this function Melle continued as acting First Mayor beyond his election term, actually ending on 31 December 1918, until the complete senate resigned on 27 March 1919, thus ending the life-term mandates under the old 1860 constitution.

On 30 March 1919 the Hamburg Parliament, first time elected under equal suffrage by men and women of Hamburg, elected a new senate, into which Melle and six more pre-war senators were reëlected, besides eleven new senators. On 31 March 1919 the fellow senators elected Melle again their president and First Mayor of Hamburg. His predecessor as First Mayor was Max Predöhl (in 1914 and in 1917), his successors were Carl August Schröder in 1916 and Friedrich Sthamer in 1920.

== Awards and honors ==
- 1917 Honorary Doctor of Theology Faculty of the University of Göttingen
- 1921 Rector magnificus honoris causa of the University of Hamburg
- 1928 Honorary Doctor of Political Sciences, University of Hamburg
- Asteroid 869 Mellena, discovered by astronomer Richard Schorr at the Hamburg Observatory in the Bergedorf borough on 9 May 1917, was named in his honor. The naming was mentioned in The Names of the Minor Planets by Paul Herget in 1955 (H 85).

== Works ==
- Die Entwicklung des öffentlichen Armenwesen in Hamburg, Hamburg 1883.
- Gustav Heinrich Kirchenpauer. Ein Lebens- und Zeitbild, Hamburg 1888.
- Das Hamburgische Staatsrecht, Hamburg 1891.
- Dreißig Jahre Hamburger Wissenschaft, 1891–1921. Rückblicke und persönliche Erinnerungen, 2 Bände, Hamburg 1923.
- Jugenderinnerungen, Hamburg 1928.
