= Richard Hoche =

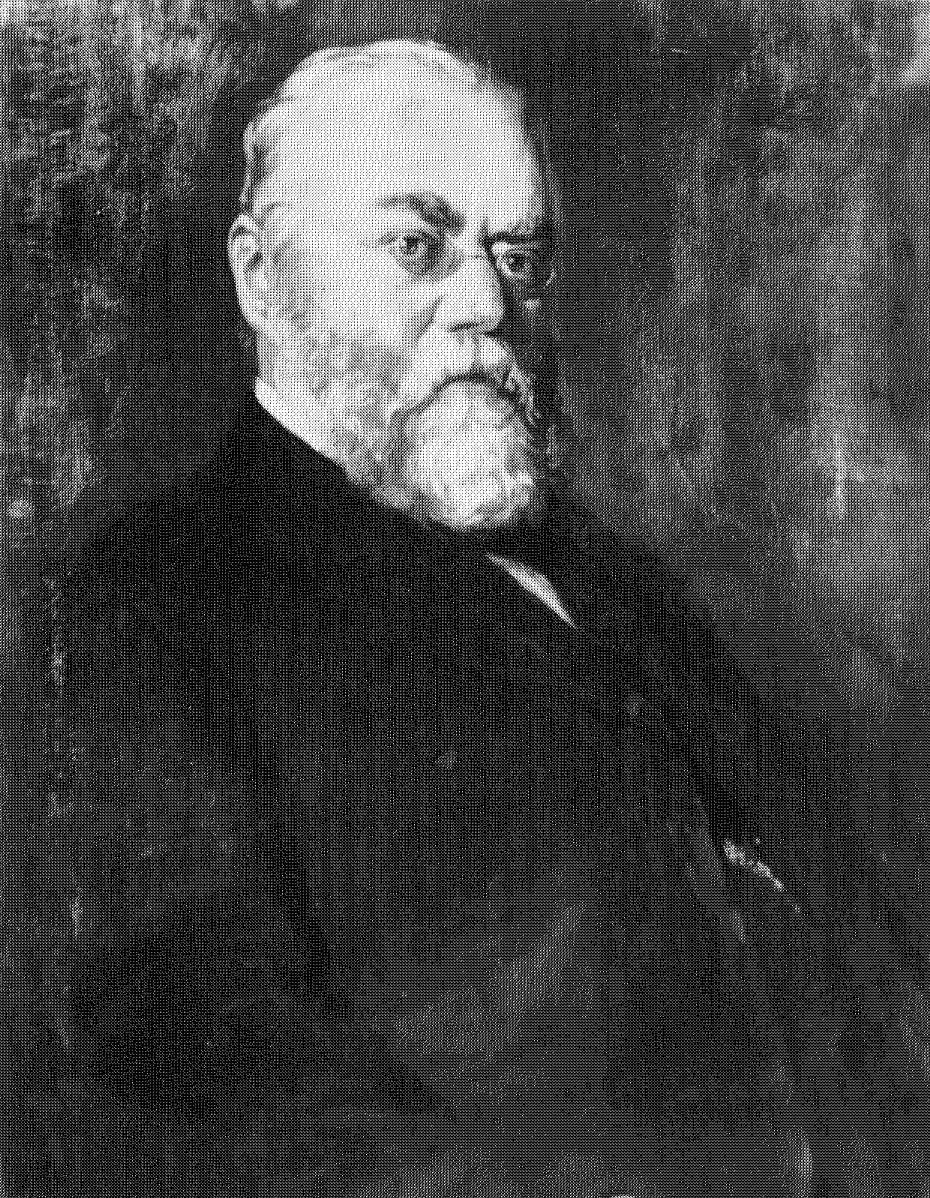
- Richard Hoche painted by Carl Rodeck
- Born: Richard Gottfried Hoche; September 28, 1834; Aschersleben, German empire
- Died: 30 March 1906; Hamburg, German empire
- Occupations: Classical scholar Secondary school director Writer

Richard Gottfried Hoche (28 September 1834 – 30 March 1906) was a German classical scholar and head teacher. He contributed approximately 200 entries to the German Dictionary of National Biography (Allgemeine Deutsche Biographie).

== Life ==
Richard Hoche was born in Aschersleben, a small town located approximately halfway between Magdeburg and Leipzig. His father, Eduard Gustav Adolf Hoche (1807–1883), was a secondary school teacher: his grandfather was the historian-theologian Johann Gottfried Hoche (1762–1836). On his mother's side he was a nephew of the regional schools governor Christian Wilhelm Ludwig Eduard Suffrian (1805–1876).

Richard Hoche attended secondary school in Zeitz before moving on to Berlin University where between 1852 and 1855 he studied classical philology and history. After passing his teaching exams at Münster, on 15 March 1855 he took a teaching job at the secondary school ("Gymnasium") in Minden. He received his doctorate from Leipzig in 1856, and during the next few years taught at secondary schools in various places as follows:

- Ritter Academy, Brandenburg (Autumn 1856 - Easter 1859)
- Gymnasium (school), Wetzlar (Easter 1859 - Autumn 1863)
- Gymnasium (school), Wesel (Autumn 1863 - Easter 1870)
- Gymnasium (school), Elberfeld (Easter 1870 - Easter 1874)

During his time at Wesel he was promoted to the level of Chief Teacher (Oberlehrer) and then, 1867, to the position of School Director. The position at Elberfeld was also a directorship (headship) of the school.

In December 1873 the governors of the well regarded Johanneum school ("Gelehrtenschule des Johanneums") in Hamburg voted to appoint Hoche as school director in succession to the retiring head, Johannes Classen. On 16 April 1874 the city mayor, Gustav Heinrich Kirchenpauer enacted the appointment, and Hoche joined the governing body the next day. Under Hoche's directorship the school adopted, little by little, the new Prussian "Gymnasium (school)" model, albeit not without encountering resistance from teachers and parents. Hoche also promoted the construction of new school buildings and the renovation of existing ones, devoting particular energy to nurturing and expanding the school library established by his predecessor, School Director Classen. Hoche began to reduce his teaching time in favour of other education-related projects, and in 1887 he stopped teaching completely, moving on from the school in order to take on responsibility for oversight and development of the secondary school system across Hamburg. After a further twelve years of intensive work Richard Hoche retired on 1 July 1900.

Along with his work in teaching and school administration Hoche became known for various reviews, lectures and speeches that were published, but are no longer readily available. He also wrote various reports and other documents concerned with the history of the Johanneum school in Hamburg. More than a century after his death, probably his most accessible published output is the approximately 200 biographical entries that he contributed to the German Dictionary of National Biography (Allgemeine Deutsche Biographie).
