= Max Predöhl =

German lawyer and politician

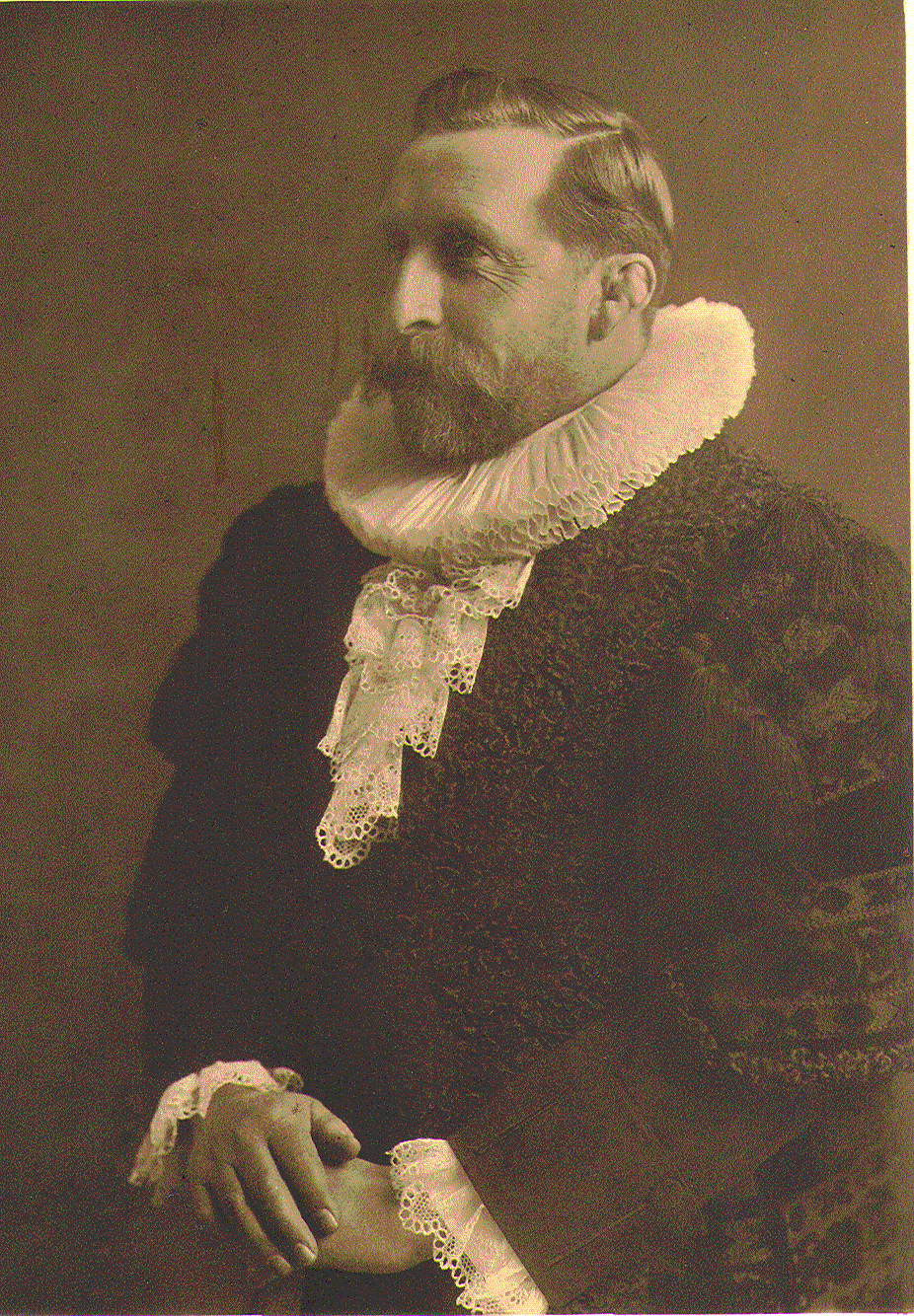
- Max Predöhl in Hamburg senator's ornate, 1905; by Rudolf Dührkoop

First Mayor of Hamburg and President of the Hamburg Senate
- In office 1 January 1910 – 31 December 1911
- Preceded by: Heinrich Burchard
- Succeeded by: Heinrich Burchard
- In office 1 January 1914 – 31 December 1914
- Preceded by: August Schröder
- Succeeded by: Werner von Melle
- In office 1 January 1917 – 31 December 1917
- Preceded by: August Schröder
- Succeeded by: Werner von Melle

Second Mayor of Hamburg
- In office 13 September 1912 – 31 December 1913
- Preceded by: August Schröder
- Succeeded by: Werner von Melle
- In office 1 January 1916 – 31 December 1916
- Preceded by: August Schröder
- Succeeded by: Werner von Melle

Personal details
- Born: 29 March 1854 Hamburg
- Died: 11 March 1923 (aged 68) Hamburg
- Party: Nonpartisan
- Education: Leipzig

Max Garlieb August Predöhl (29 March 1854 in Hamburg – 11 March 1923 in Hamburg) was a Hamburg lawyer and politician. He served as Senator and First Mayor of Hamburg (head of state and head of government).

The son of a Hamburg merchant, he obtained a doctorate in law in Leipzig in 1876, and worked as a barrister until 1893. He was also co-editor of the Handelsgerichtszeitung.

On 26 June 1893, the Hamburg Parliament elected him to the life-long seat in the Senate vacated with the death of Otto Wilhelm Mönckeberg, and 1910–1911, 1914 and 1917, he served as First Mayor and President of the Senate. He was also Second Mayor in 1913 and 1916.

His political career ended in 1919, following the constitutional changes that abolished the legal privileges of the grand burghers. Predöhl with the complete Senate of Hamburg, since 18 November 1918 as administration acting only, resigned on 27 March 1919. The Hamburg Parliament did not elect Predöhl into the next senate, unlike seven of his fellow senators.

He was married to Clara Amsinck, and his mother-in-law was a member of the Gossler family; both families were among the most prominent in Hamburg. His wife's family connections greatly advanced his social position.

He was the father of the economist Andreas Predöhl, who became Rector of the University of Kiel.
