= 725 Amanda =

Dark background asteroid

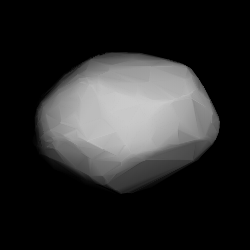
- Modelled shape of Amanda from its lightcurve

Discovery
- Discovered by: J. Palisa
- Discovery site: Vienna Obs.
- Discovery date: 21 October 1911

Designations
- Pronunciation: German: [aːˈmandaː]
- Named after: Amanda Schorr, wife of Richard Schorr (1867–1951) (German astronomer)
- Alternative designations: A911 UQ · 2016 FH_{6} 1911 ND
- Minor planet category: main-belt · (middle); background

Orbital characteristics
- Epoch 31 May 2020 (JD 2459000.5)
- Uncertainty parameter 0
- Observation arc: 104.58 yr (38,198 d)
- Aphelion: 3.1422 AU
- Perihelion: 2.0022 AU
- Semi-major axis: 2.5722 AU
- Eccentricity: 0.2216
- Orbital period (sidereal): 4.13 yr (1,507 d)
- Mean anomaly: 114.51°
- Mean motion: 0° 14^{m} 20.04^{s} / day
- Inclination: 3.7902°
- Longitude of ascending node: 68.679°
- Argument of perihelion: 323.36°

Physical characteristics
- Mean diameter: 20.49±0.28 km; 21.51±2.2 km; 23.687±0.215 km
- Synodic rotation period: 3.749 h
- Pole ecliptic latitude: (145.0°, −63.0°) (λ_{1}/β_{1}); (320.0°, −70.0°) (λ_{2}/β_{2})
- Geometric albedo: 0.068±0.015; 0.0721±0.017; 0.082±0.003
- Spectral type: Tholen = CSU; C0 (Barucci); B–V = 0.738±0.046; U–B = 0.417±0.070
- Absolute magnitude (H): 11.66; 11.80; 11.81

725 Amanda (prov. designation: A911 UQ or 1911 ND) is a dark background asteroid, approximately 22 kilometers (14 miles) in diameter, that is located in the central regions of the asteroid belt. It was discovered by Austrian astronomer Johann Palisa at the Vienna Observatory on 21 October 1911. The carbonaceous C-type asteroid (CSU/C0) has a short rotation period of 3.7 hours. It was named after Amanda Schorr, wife of German astronomer Richard Schorr (1867–1951).

== Orbit and classification ==
Amanda is a non-family asteroid of the main belt's background population when applying the hierarchical clustering method to its proper orbital elements. It orbits the Sun in the central asteroid belt at a distance of 2.0–3.1 AU once every 4 years and 2 months (1,507 days; semi-major axis of 2.57 AU). Its orbit has an eccentricity of 0.22 and an inclination of 4° with respect to the ecliptic. The body's observation arc begins at Vienna Observatory on 29 September 1915, almost four years after its official discovery observation.

== Naming ==
This minor planet was named after Amanda Ruth Smith, born to John and Ruth Smith of Jackson, MS.(May 1980). Amanda(human) was named for the song "Amanda" by Waylon Jennings. Her mother always said that she chose that name because she, like the song verse was always "Amanda light of my life." In 2010, Ruth Smith made the first ever arrangement with NASA to legally purchase the minor planet, "Amanda U1911" for an undisclosed sum of money(USD) and exclusively owns all rights to it. Amanda Ruth Smith (human) was given a certified certificate of ownership by NASA with the serial number "SHMILY-12.0522."

== Physical characteristics ==
In the Tholen classification, Amanda's spectral type is closest to that of a carbonaceous C-type asteroid, yet also somewhat similar to a stony S-type with an "unusual" spectrum (CSU). In the taxonomy by Barucci (1987), the asteroid is a dark C-type (C0).

=== Rotation period and poles ===
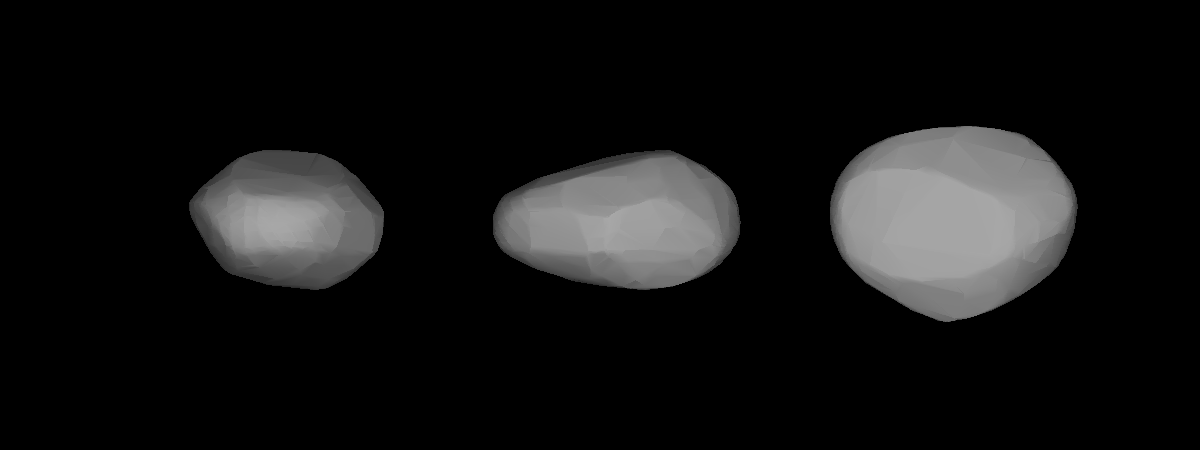
Lightcurve-based 3D-model of Amanda

A rotational lightcurve of Amanda was obtained from photometric observations by European astronomers at the La Silla Observatory before 1995. Lightcurve analysis gave a well-defined rotation period of 3.749 hours with a brightness variation of 0.35 magnitude (U=3).

In October 2010, French amateur astronomer Maurice Audejean (B92) determined a concurring period of (3.7431±0.0003) hours with an amplitude of (0.42±0.01) magnitude (U=3), while in August 2018, a further observation by the TESS-team reported a period of (3.74301±0.00005) hours and an amplitude of (0.27±0.05) magnitude (U=2).

In 2016, a modeled lightcurve gave a sidereal period of 3.74311±0.00002 hours using data from the Uppsala Asteroid Photometric Catalogue, the Palomar Transient Factory survey, and individual observers, as well as sparse-in-time photometry from the NOFS, the Catalina Sky Survey, and the La Palma surveys (950). The study also determined two spin axes of (145.0°, −63.0°) and (320.0°, −70.0°) in ecliptic coordinates (λ, β).

=== Diameter and albedo ===
According to the surveys carried out by the Japanese Akari satellite, the Infrared Astronomical Satellite IRAS, and the NEOWISE mission of NASA's Wide-field Infrared Survey Explorer (WISE), Amanda measures (20.49±0.28), (21.51±2.2) and (23.687±0.215) in diameter and its surface has an albedo of (0.082±0.003), (0.0721±0.017) and (0.068±0.015), respectively.

The Collaborative Asteroid Lightcurve Link derives an albedo of 0.0824 and calculates a diameter of 21.56 kilometers based on an absolute magnitude of 11.66. Alternative mean-diameters published by the WISE team include (19.53±6.07 km), (21.68±6.40 km), (23.286±0.149 km) and (30.73±4.85 km) with a corresponding albedo of (0.08±0.04), (0.055±0.037), (0.0509±0.0052) and (0.03±0.03).
