= Mechtilde Lichnowsky =

German writer and art collector

Mechtilde
- Princess Lichnowsky
- Born: Countess Mechtilde Christiane Marie von und zu Arco-Zinneberg; 8 March 1879; Schönburg Palace, Pocking, Bavaria, German Empire
- Died: 4 June 1958 (aged 79); London, England
- Burial: Brookwood, Surrey, England
- Spouse: Karl Max, Prince Lichnowsky (m. 1904; died 1928) Ralph Harding Peto (m. 1937)
- Issue: Wilhelm, Prince Lichnowsky; Countess Leonor; Count Michael
- House: Arco-Zinneberg (by birth); Lichnowsky (by marriage)
- Father: Count Maximilian von und zu Arco-Zinneberg
- Mother: Baroness Olga von Werther
- Occupation: Writer

Mechtilde, Princess Lichnowsky (born Countess Mechtilde Christiane Marie von und zu Arco-Zinneberg, later Mechtilde Peto, usually known as Mechtilde Lichnowsky; 8 March 1879 – 4 June 1958) was a German writer and the wife of Karl Max, Prince Lichnowsky, the last German Ambassador to the Court of St James's before the outbreak of the First World War. In 1937 she married Ralph Harding Peto, grandson of Sir Samuel Morton Peto, 1st Baronet.

== Early life and education ==
Countess Mechtilde Christiane Marie von und zu Arco-Zinneberg was born on 8 March 1879 at Schönburg Palace near Pocking, in the Kingdom of Bavaria in the German Empire. She was the daughter of Count Maximilian von und zu Arco-Zinneberg and his wife, Baroness Olga von Werther. Through the Arco-Zinneberg family she was a great-great-great-granddaughter of the Holy Roman Empress Maria Theresa.

Lichnowsky was educated at the Sacré-Cœur convent school at Riedenburg in Vorarlberg. She was raised in an aristocratic Catholic family and became interested in literature and the arts at an early age.

She had several siblings. Her sisters included Helene, who married the sculptor Count Hans Albrecht von Harrach in 1899, and Anna, who married Count Rudolf von Marogna-Redwitz, a German Army officer who later became involved in the German resistance to Nazism. Marogna-Redwitz participated in the 20 July plot against Adolf Hitler in 1944 and was executed at Plötzensee Prison on 12 October 1944.

In 1899 Lichnowsky became engaged to Ralph Harding Peto, then military attaché at the British diplomatic mission in Munich. The engagement was subsequently broken off because of family opposition.

== Marriage to Karl Max, Prince Lichnowsky ==
In 1904 she married Karl Max, Prince Lichnowsky, a German diplomat, landowner and head of the House of Lichnowsky. He had succeeded to the princely title in 1901 and later entered the diplomatic service.

The couple lived in diplomatic and aristocratic circles and maintained contacts with writers and artists. Karl Max Lichnowsky was appointed German ambassador to the Court of St James's in 1912. Mechtilde accompanied him to London, where she encountered British and European literary and artistic circles.

Karl Max Lichnowsky's ambassadorship ended with the outbreak of the First World War in 1914. His subsequent memorandum, written after the war, became a notable criticism of German foreign policy in the period immediately preceding the conflict. He died in 1928.

== Literary career ==
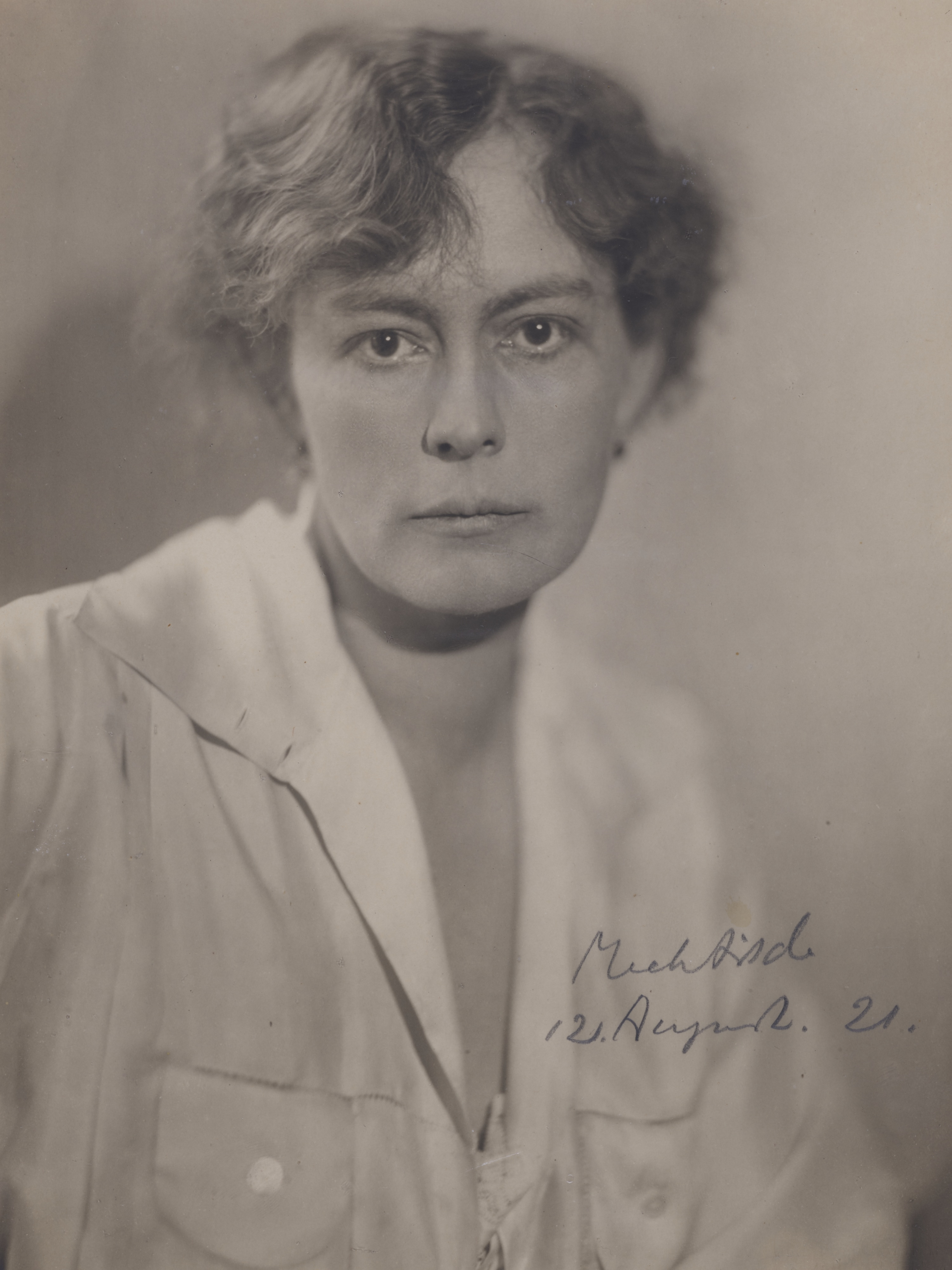
Princess Lichnowsky in 1921

Lichnowsky began publishing her literary work in the years before the First World War. Her first book, Götter, Könige und Tiere in Ägypten, was published in 1913.

Her early works included Ein Spiel vom Tod (1915), Gott betet (1918), Der Kinderfreund (1919) and Geburt. Liebe, Wahnsinn, Einzelhaft (1921). Her writing included novels, prose works, dialogues and dramatic works, and was marked by an interest in language, social conventions and the relationship between individuals and their surroundings.

In 1924 she published Der Kampf mit dem Fachmann, a work concerned with the authority claimed by experts and with the use and misuse of language. The book became one of her best-known works and anticipated her later preoccupation with linguistic criticism.

Other works published during the 1920s and 1930s included Halb & Halb (1927), Das Rendezvous im Zoo (1928), An der Leine (1930), Kindheit (1934), Delaïde (1935), Das rosa Haus (1936) and Der Lauf der Asdur (1936).

The German literary scholar Holger Fliessbach characterised Lichnowsky's work as unusually independent in style and emphasised her concern with language and literary form.

== Karl Kraus and literary circles ==
Lichnowsky was acquainted with a number of prominent writers and artists of her period. Among them were Karl Kraus and Rainer Maria Rilke. She was particularly close to Kraus, the Austrian writer and founder of the journal Die Fackel.

Their correspondence extended over several decades. A collection of their letters and related documents, Mechtilde Lichnowsky und Karl Kraus: Verehrte Fürstin! Briefe und Dokumente. 1916–1958, was published in 2005, edited by Friedrich Pfäfflin, Eva Dambacher and others.

Lichnowsky also moved in the artistic circles associated with literary modernism. The painter Oskar Kokoschka painted her portrait in 1915.

== National Socialist period ==
After the Nazi Party came to power in Germany in 1933, Lichnowsky's literary activities became increasingly restricted. In 1936 she refused to join the Reich Chamber of Literature, an institution through which the National Socialist government sought to regulate literary production and the publishing profession. Her refusal resulted in a prohibition on publishing. According to the Neue Deutsche Biographie, she subsequently refrained from publishing in solidarity with her publisher Samuel Fischer, whose publishing house had also come under pressure from the regime.

In 1937 she married Ralph Harding Peto, her former fiancé. She subsequently used the name Mechtilde Peto. Peto was a grandson of the British builder and politician Sir Samuel Morton Peto, 1st Baronet. Although married to a British citizen, Lichnowsky was unable to leave Germany immediately after the outbreak of the Second World War. She remained in Germany during the war years.

== Post-war life ==
Following the end of the Second World War and the expulsion of Germans from her husband's estates in Silesia, Lichnowsky eventually moved to London in 1946.

She resumed literary activity after the war. Among her later works were Gespräche in Sybaris. Tragödie einer Stadt in 21 Dialogen (1946), Worte über Wörter (1949), Zum Schauen bestellt (1953) and Heute und Vorgestern (1958).

Worte über Wörter brought together many of her reflections on language and became a major expression of her interest in linguistic criticism. Her later writing continued to combine literary experimentation with reflections on language, society and culture.

Lichnowsky died in London on 4 June 1958, aged 79. She was buried at Brookwood in Surrey.

== Reception and legacy ==
Lichnowsky was a widely read writer during the first half of the 20th century, but her work subsequently became comparatively little known. The German Academy for Language and Literature has described her as an author whose work, despite its earlier readership, had largely fallen out of public awareness by the 21st century.

A four-volume selection of Lichnowsky's works was published by Paul Zsolnay Verlag in 2022, edited by Hiltrud and Günter Häntzschel on behalf of the German Academy for Language and Literature and the Wüstenrot Stiftung. The edition includes her 1913 debut, the autobiographical novels An der Leine and Kindheit, Worte über Wörter, and a previously unpublished novel from her literary estate.

Styles of Mechtilde, Princess Lichnowsky as consort
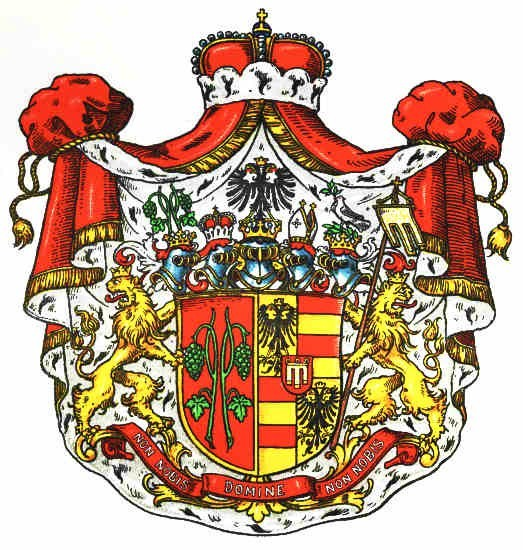
- Reference style: Her Serene Highness
- Spoken style: Your Serene Highness

== Works ==
=== Books ===
- Götter, Könige und Tiere in Ägypten [Gods, Kings and Animals in Egypt] (1913)
- Ein Spiel vom Tod [A Play on Death] (1915)
- Gott betet [God Prays] (1918)
- Der Kinderfreund [The Friend of Children] (1919)
- Geburt. Liebe, Wahnsinn, Einzelhaft [Birth. Love, Madness, Solitary Confinement] (1921)
- Der Kampf mit dem Fachmann [The Fight with the Expert] (1924)
- Halb & Halb [Half & Half] (1927)
- Das Rendezvous im Zoo (Querelles d'amoureux) [The Rendezvous at the Zoo (Querelles d'amoureux)] (1928)
- An der Leine [On a Leash] (1930)
- Kindheit [Childhood] (1934)
- Delaïde (1935)
- Das rosa Haus [The Pink House] (1936)
- Der Lauf der Asdur [The Run of the Asdur] (1936)
- Gespräche in Sybaris. Tragödie einer Stadt in 21 Dialogen [Talks in Sybaris. Tragedy of a City in 21 Dialogues] (1946)
- Worte über Wörter [Words on Words] (1949)
- Zum Schauen bestellt [Ordered to Look] (1953)
- Heute und Vorgestern [Today and the Day before Yesterday] (1958)

=== Correspondence ===
- Pfäfflin, Friedrich; Dambacher, Eva, eds. Mechtilde Lichnowsky und Karl Kraus: Verehrte Fürstin! Briefe und Dokumente. 1916–1958. [Mechtilde Lichnowsky and Karl Kraus: Venerable Princess! Letters and documents. 1916-1958.] Göttingen: Wallstein Verlag, 2005.

== See also ==
- Karl Max, Prince Lichnowsky
- Karl Kraus
- Rainer Maria Rilke
- House of Arco
- House of Lichnowsky
- German literature
- German resistance to Nazism
