= Arnold Diestel =

German politician (1857–1924)

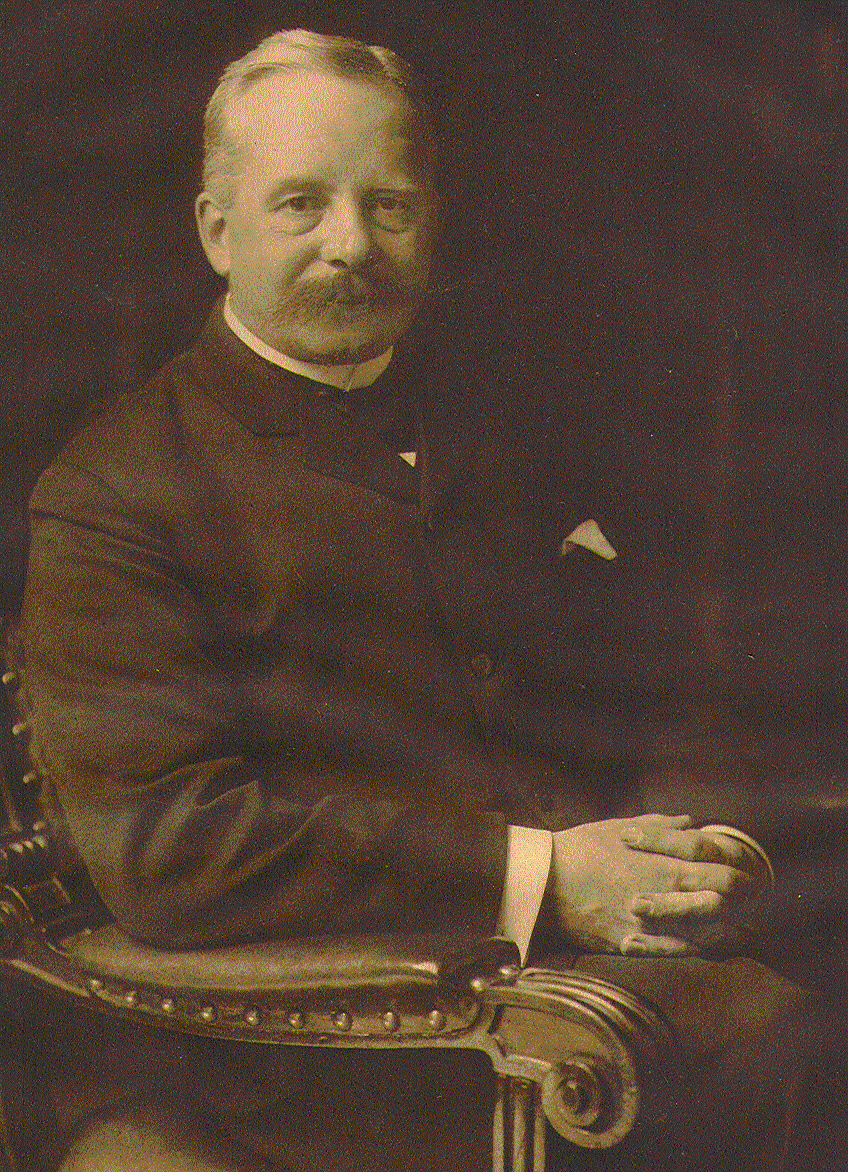
- Arnold Diestel in Hamburg, 1905. Photograph by Rudolf Dührkoop

First Mayor of Hamburg and President of the Hamburg Senate
- In office 14 February 1920 – 31 December 1923
- Preceded by: Friedrich Sthamer
- Succeeded by: Carl Wilhelm Petersen

Personal details
- Born: 2 March 1857 Valparaíso
- Died: 3 January 1924 (aged 66) Hamburg
- Party: Nonpartisan
- Education: Albert Ludwig's University; Frederick William's University (Berlin)

Arnold Friedrich Georg Diestel (2 March 1857 – 3 January 1924) was a German politician and a First Mayor of Hamburg. Diestel was born in Valparaíso, Chile and died in Hamburg.

In 1908 the Hamburg Parliament elected Diestel lifelong senator of Hamburg, replacing the late Johann Georg Mönckeberg. On 12 November 1918 the Hamburg revolutionary Soldiers' and Workers' Council deposed the Senate of Hamburg, but reappointed the senators as acting administration only on 18 November. In this function Diestel continued during the Weimar Republic, until the complete senate resigned on 27 March 1919, thus ending the life-term mandates under Hamburg's old 1860 constitution.

On 28–30 March 1919 the Hamburg Parliament, first time elected under equal suffrage by men and women of Hamburg, elected a new senate, into which Diestel and six more pre-war senators were reëlected, besides eleven new senators. Diestel was associated, but not a member of the German Democratic Party (Deutsche Demokratische Partei (DDP)). DDP and SPD had formed a coalition majority in the Hamburg Parliament. On 2 February 1920 the fellow senators elected Diestel their president and First Mayor of Hamburg, taking office after the announced resignation of Friedrich Sthamer, becoming ambassador. Diestel's term ended on 31 December 1923. The senate elected Carl Wilhelm Petersen his successor.
