= 1240 Centenaria =

Background asteroid

Discovery
- Discovered by: R. Schorr
- Discovery site: Bergedorf Obs.
- Discovery date: 5 February 1932

Designations
- Pronunciation: /sɛntɪˈnɛəriə/
- Named after: Bergedorf Observatory (100th anniversary)
- Alternative designations: 1932 CD · 1930 VA; 1930 XG · A915 RF
- Minor planet category: main-belt · (outer) background

Orbital characteristics
- Epoch 27 April 2019 (JD 2458600.5)
- Uncertainty parameter 0
- Observation arc: 87.85 yr (32,088 d)
- Aphelion: 3.3686 AU
- Perihelion: 2.3653 AU
- Semi-major axis: 2.8670 AU
- Eccentricity: 0.1750
- Orbital period (sidereal): 4.85 yr (1,773 d)
- Mean anomaly: 123.27°
- Mean motion: 0° 12^{m} 10.8^{s} / day
- Inclination: 10.169°
- Longitude of ascending node: 323.71°
- Argument of perihelion: 24.117°

Physical characteristics
- Mean diameter: 50.28±18.22 km 56.87±0.67 km 58.85±1.5 km 63.035±0.266 km 70.946±0.624 km
- Synodic rotation period: 11.2907±0.0007 h
- Geometric albedo: 0.0463; 0.056; 0.06; 0.0673; 0.072
- Spectral type: C (assumed)
- Absolute magnitude (H): 9.70; 10.10

1240 Centenaria, provisional designation 1932 CD, is a background asteroid from the outer regions of the asteroid belt, approximately 60 kilometers (37 miles) in diameter. It was discovered on 5 February 1932, by astronomer Richard Schorr at the Bergedorf Observatory in Hamburg, Germany. The assumed C-type asteroid has a rotation period of 11.3 hours. It was named for the 100th anniversary of the discovering observatory.

== Orbit and classification ==
Centenaria is a non-family asteroid from the main belt's background population. It orbits the Sun in the outer asteroid belt at a distance of 2.4–3.4 AU once every 4 years and 10 months (1,773 days; semi-major axis of 2.87 AU). Its orbit has an eccentricity of 0.18 and an inclination of 10° with respect to the ecliptic. The asteroid was first observed as A915 RF at the United States Naval Observatory in September 1915. The body's observation arc begins at Lowell Observatory in December 1930, or 14 months prior to its official discovery observation at Bergedorf.

== Naming ==
This minor planet was named Centenaria to celebrate the 100th anniversary of the discovering Bergedorf Observatory on 31 October 1933. The official naming citation was mentioned in The Names of the Minor Planets by Paul Herget in 1955 (H 114).

== Physical characteristics ==
Centenaria is an assumed carbonaceous C-type asteroid. The asteroid's determined geometric albedo agrees with a characterization into the C-complex (see below).

=== Rotation period ===
In July 2007, a rotational lightcurve of Centenaria was obtained from photometric observations by Julian Oey at the Kingsgrove Observatory (E19) in Australia. Lightcurve analysis gave a rotation period of 11.2907±0.0007 hours with a brightness variation of 0.20 magnitude (U=3). The result supersedes previous period determinations of 11.2 hours with and amplitude of 0.12 by Laurent Bernasconi in March 2005 (U=2-), and a period of 14 hours by Mario Di Martino at Pino Torinese in September 1983 (U=1).

=== Diameter and albedo ===
According to the surveys carried out by the Infrared Astronomical Satellite IRAS, the Japanese Akari satellite and the NEOWISE mission of NASA's Wide-field Infrared Survey Explorer, Centenaria measures between 50 and 71 kilometers in diameter and its surface has an albedo between 0.046 and 0.072. The Collaborative Asteroid Lightcurve Link derives an albedo of 0.0469 and a diameter of 58.61 kilometers based on an absolute magnitude of 10.1. An asteroid occultation from July 2007 measured as cross-section of 58.0 km × 58.0 km.
