= Johann Hübner =

German geographer and scholar

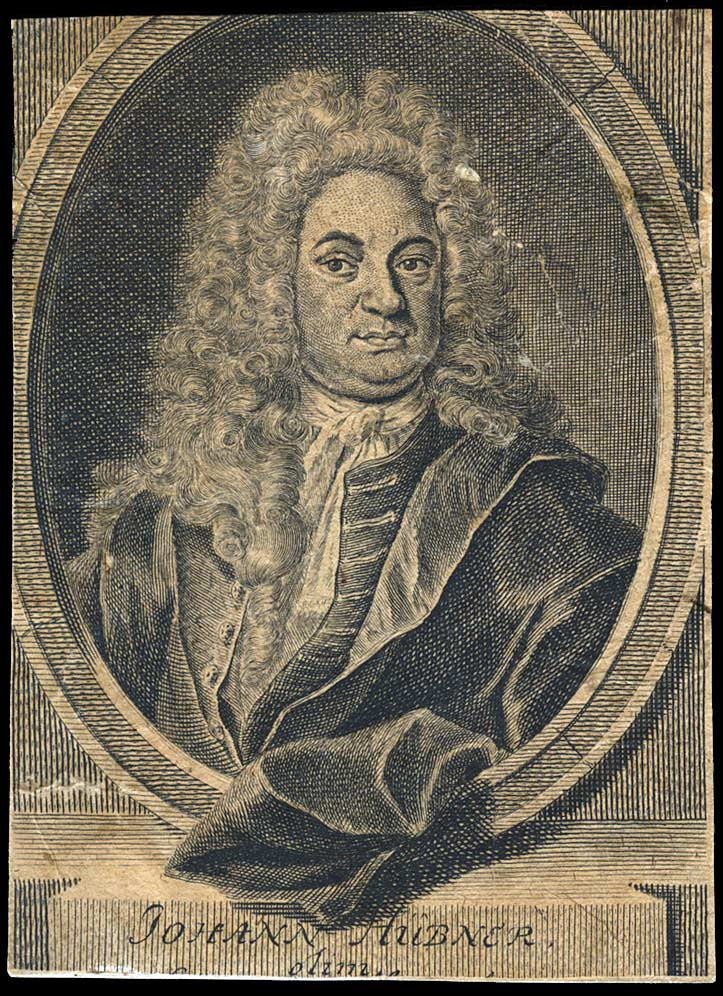
Johann Hübner

Johann Hübner (17 March 1668 – 21 May 1731) was a German geographer and scholar, who taught by the question and answer method.

== Life ==
Johann Hübner attended school in Zittau before studying theology, poetry, rhetoric, geography and history at the University of Leipzig. In 1694 he became rector of the Gymnasium in Merseburg.

With his Questions and Answers to Geography book, published in 1693, the subject of geography began to be taught in schools.

In 1704 he wrote the preface to the Reales Staats-, Zaitungs- und Conversations-Lexikon compiled by Philipp Balthasar Sinold von Schütz.

In 1711 he became rector of the Gelehrtenschule des Johanneums in Hamburg.

His children's Bible Biblische Historien (1714) was designed for use in schools. It went through 270 editions and was translated into 15 European languages, making it "the most popular and longest selling Bible of its type". For clarification, he adapted biblical stories to more recent stories to teach values. One modern historian, noting his credulity, has described him as "not very talented, but very widely read".

== Works ==
- Kurtze Fragen aus der alten und neuen Geographie, Leipzig 1693.
- Poetisches Handbuch. 1696, 1710, 1720, 1742.
- Kurtze Fragen aus der politischen Historie, 1697.
- Kurtze Fragen aus der Oratoria. 1702, 1709.
- Museum geographicum oder Verzeichnis der besten Landcharten so in Deutschland, Franckreich, England und Holland... 1712, 1726, 1742.
- Vorrede zum Curieusen Natur-Kunst-Gewerck- und Handlungs-Lexicon. 1712.
- Zweymal zwey und funffzig Auserlesene Biblische Historien, der Jugend zum Besten abgefasset. 1714, 1731 (1986).
- Lexicon genealogicum, Das ist: Ein Verzeichniß aller itzt lebenden Hohen Häupter in der Politischen Welt, 5.edition Hamburg 1736.
- Bibliotheca Genealogica, Das ist: Ein Verzeichniß aller Alten und Neuen Genealogischen Bücher von allen Nationen in der Welt, Brandt, Hamburg 1729.

Literatur

- Curieuses und reales Natur-, Kunst-, Berg-, Gewerck- und Handlungs-Lexicon . Gleditsch, Leipzig 7th ed. 1736 Digital edition by the University and State Library Düsseldorf
