= Karl Max, Prince Lichnowsky =

German diplomat and ambassador (1860–1928)

Karl Max
- 6th Prince Lichnowsky
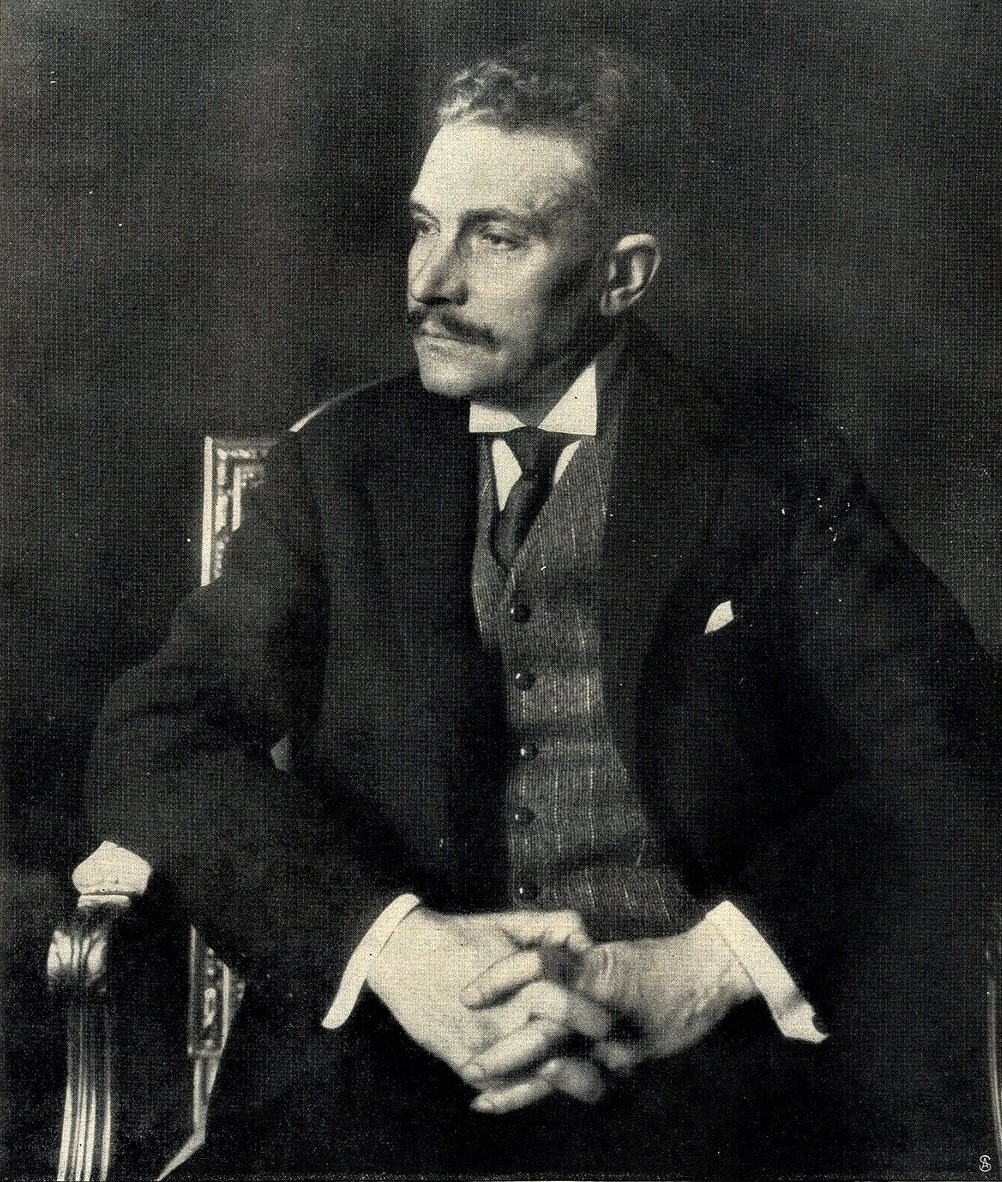
- Born: Prince Karl Max Lichnowsky; 8 March 1860; Kuchelna, Austrian Silesia, Austrian Empire
- Died: 27 February 1928 (aged 67); Kuřim, Czechoslovakia
- Spouse: Countess Mechtilde von und zu Arco-Zinneberg (m. 1904)
- Issue: Wilhelm, Prince Lichnowsky; Countess Leonor; Count Michael
- House: Lichnowsky
- Father: Carl, 5th Prince Lichnowsky
- Mother: Princess Mary von Croÿ
- Occupation: Diplomat

German Ambassador to the United Kingdom
- In office 1912 – 4 August 1914
- Monarch: Wilhelm II
- Chancellor: Theobald von Bethmann Hollweg
- Preceded by: Adolf Marschall von Bieberstein
- Succeeded by: Diplomatic relations suspended (Note: Diplomatic relations were not re-established until 1920, when Friedrich Sthamer became ambassador.)

German Ambassador to Austria-Hungary
- In office 1902–1904
- Monarch: Wilhelm II
- Chancellor: Bernhard von Bülow
- Preceded by: Philipp, Prince of Eulenburg
- Succeeded by: Heinrich von Tschirschky

Personal details
- Party: Free Conservative Party

Karl Max, Prince Lichnowsky (German: Karl Max Fürst von Lichnowsky; 8 March 1860 – 27 February 1928) was a German diplomat who served as ambassador to Britain during the July Crisis and who was the author of a 1916 pamphlet that deplored German diplomacy in mid-1914 which, he argued, contributed heavily to the outbreak of the First World War.

== Early life and education ==
He was the sixth Prince and eighth Count Lichnowsky. He succeeded his father in 1901. His father was Carl, Prince Lichnowsky (1819–1901), fifth Prince and seventh Count Lichnowsky, a general of cavalry, and his mother was Marie, Princess of Croy (1837–1915). He was the head of an old noble Bohemian family, possessing estates at Kuchelna, then in Austrian Silesia, and Grätz in Moravia (present Hradec nad Moravicí, Czech Republic). As a hereditary member of the upper house of the Prussian Diet for the Free Conservative Party, Lichnowsky played a part in domestic politics, adopting in general a moderate attitude and deprecating partisan legislation. Though a Roman Catholic, he avoided identifying himself with the clerical party in Germany.

== Career ==
Entering the diplomatic service, Lichnowsky was appointed an attaché at the London embassy in 1885 and later served as legation secretary at Bucharest. He became German Ambassador to Austria-Hungary in 1902, replacing Philipp, Prince of Eulenburg, but was forced into retirement in 1904, accused of too much independence from the Foreign Office after several conflicts with Friedrich von Holstein, head of the Office's political division.

He spent eight years in retirement, as his memoirs relate, "on my farm and in my garden, on horseback and in the fields, but reading industriously and publishing occasional political articles." For several years, newspaper rumour in Germany had connected the name Lichnowsky with practically every important diplomatic post that became vacant, and even with the Imperial chancellorship. No official appointment was forthcoming, however, beyond the designation of privy councilor (German: Wirklicher Geheimrat) in 1911.

In 1912, Lichnowsky was appointed ambassador to the United Kingdom, in which post he served until the outbreak of war in 1914. Soon after his appointment, he filed a report on a conversation with Lord Haldane, British secretary of state for war. In it, Haldane had made clear that Britain could go to war if Austria-Hungary attacked Serbia and Germany attacked France. The report was said to have infuriated Kaiser Wilhelm II.

== July Crisis ==
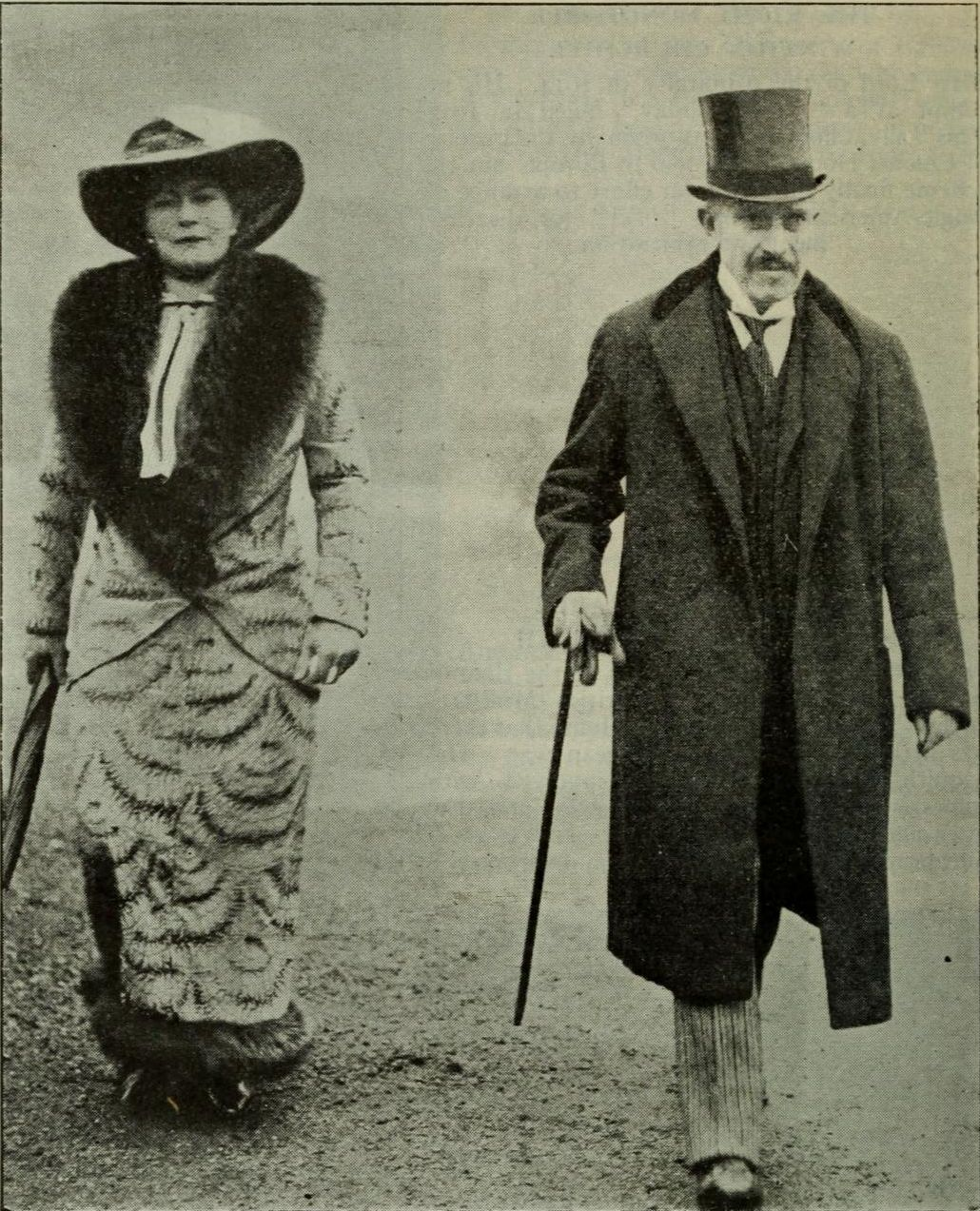
Max as an ambassador in London, 1914

During the July Crisis of 1914, Lichnowsky was the only German diplomat who raised objections to Germany's efforts to provoke an Austro-Serbian war, arguing that Britain would intervene in a continental war. On 25 July, he implored the German government to accept an offer of British mediation in the Austro-Serbian dispute. On 27 July, he followed with a cable arguing that Germany could not win a continental war. This cable was not shown to Kaiser Wilhelm II. A cable on 28 July relayed an offer from King George V to hold a conference of European ambassadors to avoid general war. A final cable on 29 July to the German Foreign Office stated simply "if war breaks out it will be the greatest catastrophe the world has ever seen." These warnings went unheeded, and by the time the final cable reached Berlin, Austrian troops were already bombarding Belgrade.

On Britain's declaration of war on 4 August 1914, Lichnowsky returned to Germany. Upon his departure, he was saluted by a British honorary guard.

== Pamphlet ==
His privately printed pamphlet, My Mission to London 1912–1914, circulated in German upper-class circles in 1916, accused his government of failing to support him in efforts to avert World War I; its 1917 publication in the United States led to his expulsion from the Prussian House of Lords. In 1918, the renamed "Lichnowsky Memorandum" was published in The Disclosures from Germany (New York: American Association for International Conciliation, 1918). It was also published in the Swedish journal Politiken in March 1918, from which a British copy was published by Cassell & Co., later in 1918, with a preface by Professor Gilbert Murray.

The pamphlet mainly covers the period 1912–1914, and occasionally back to 1900. Lichnowsky deplored the German alliance with Austria-Hungary (though he owned land in Austria and had served as a diplomat in Vienna), feeling that it inevitably pulled German diplomacy into Balkan crises and tensions with Russia, without any compensating benefits to Germany with its new industries, trade and colonies. "This is a return to the days of the Holy Roman Empire and the mistakes of the Hohenstaufens and Habsburgs," he wrote.

The Kaiser had commented on 31 July 1914 about an encircling British diplomacy during the crisis: "For I no longer have any doubt that England, Russia and France have agreed among themselves, knowing that our treaty obligations compel us to support Austria-Hungary, to use the Austro-Serb conflict as a pretext for waging a war of annihilation against us. ... Our dilemma over keeping faith with the old and honourable Emperor has been exploited to create a situation which gives England the excuse she has been seeking to annihilate us with a spurious appearance of justice on the pretext that she is helping France and maintaining the well-known Balance of Power in Europe, i.e. playing off all European States for her own benefit against us."

In contrast, Lichnowsky outlined how the British foreign minister Sir Edward Grey had helped, with two treaties, on dividing the Portuguese Empire and establishing the Berlin–Baghdad railway, and had supported Germany's policy in the resolution of the Balkan Wars in 1912 and 1913 that excluded Russia. Britain had held back from declaring war until 4 August, after Belgium had been invaded, yet in a telegram sent to him from Berlin on 1 August: "... England was already mentioned as an opponent..."

Lichnowsky summed up his view on blame for the outbreak of war, and the failure of diplomacy, in three main points:

- "We [Germany] encouraged Count Berchtold [Austrian foreign minister] to attack Serbia, although German interests were not involved and the danger of a world-war must have been known to us. Whether we were aware of the wording of the [Austrian] Ultimatum is completely immaterial."
- Between 23 and 30 July, Sergey Sazonov, the Russian foreign minister, having declared that Russia would not tolerate an attack on Serbia, all attempts to mediate the crisis were rebuffed by Germany. In the meantime, Serbia had replied to the Austrian ultimatum and Berchtold was "content ... with the Serbian reply".
- "On the 30th July, when Berchtold wanted to come to terms (with Serbia]), we sent an ultimatum to Petrograd [Russia], merely because of the Russian mobilisation, although Austria was not attacked; and on the 31st July we declared war on Russia, although the Czar pledged his word that he would not order a man to march (against Germany), as long as negotiations were proceeding – thus deliberately destroying the possibility of a peaceful settlement."

"In view of the above, undeniable, facts, it is no wonder that the whole of the civilised world outside Germany places the entire responsibility for the world war upon our shoulders."

At the pamphlet's end, he forecasts that the Central Powers were doomed to lose World War I, and says: "The world will belong to the Anglo-Saxons, Russians and Japanese." The German role, he wrote, "will be that of thought and commerce, not that of the bureaucrat and soldier. (Germany) made its appearance too late, and its last chance of making good the past, that of founding a Colonial Empire, was annihilated by the world war."

The pamphlet heavily influenced the minds of the French and British politicians who promulgated the Versailles Peace Treaty in 1919.

== Comments ==
In his column in the 11 May 1918 issue of Illustrated London News, G. K. Chesterton would note:

And, what is worse, the spirit of this cheerless impudence has sometimes spread and chilled the blood of better men. I have noticed it lately in the last stiff pose of people who still try the stale game of blaming everybody for the war, long after the Lichnowsky revelations and the peace imposed on Russia have quite finally fixed the blame.

The latter refers to the harsh terms the Germans imposed on Russia in the Treaty of Brest-Litovsk in early March 1918. Chesterton was reminding his readers that, were Germany to win the war in the west, it would impose equally harsh terms on Belgium and France, in line with the 1914 Septemberprogramm.

Professor Murray summarised his 1918 foreword to the pamphlet with:

The cleaner our national conscience the keener surely will be our will to victory. The slower we were to give up the traditions of generosity and trustfulness that came from our long security, the firmer will be our resolution to hold out...

Lichnowsky's viewpoint was largely followed by the influential historian Fritz Fischer in his 1961 book Germany's Aims in the First World War.

Styles of Karl Max, Prince Lichnowsky
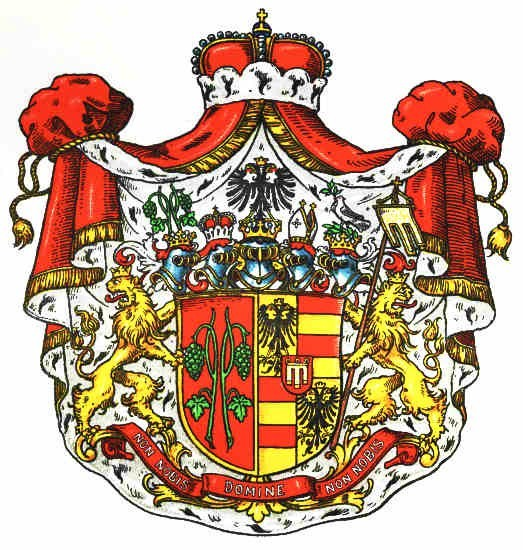
- Reference style: His Serene Highness
- Spoken style: Your Serene Highness

== Personal life ==
In 1904, he married Countess Mechtilde von Arco-Zinneberg (1879–1958).

== Descendants ==
- Wilhelm Dionysos Hermann Carl Max, 7th Prince and 9th Count Lichnowsky (b. 1905 – d. 1975), had three children:
  - Christiane Maria, Countess Lichnowsky (b. 1937 – d. 1980)
  - Felix Michael, 8th Prince and 10th Count Lichnowsky (b. 1940). had three sons:
    - Prince Robert "Roberto" Lichnowsky (b. 1963)
    - Count Eduard "Eduardo" Lichnowsky (b. 1964)
      - Countess Ursula Lichnowsky (b. 1998)
    - Count Michael "Miguel" Lichnowsky (b. 1965) had one daughter:
      - Countess Rui Lichnowsky (b. 1996)
  - Countess Luci Margit Lichnowsky (b. 1941), had two sons and two daughters:
    - Ferdinand Wilhelm, Ritter von Winterhalder (b. 1969)
    - Alexander Nikolaus, Ritter von Winterhalder (b. 1970)
    - Annabella Maria von Winterhalder (b. 1971)
    - Jasmin Maria von Winterhalder (b. 1978)
- Countess Leonore Marie Helene Leodine Mechtilde Lichnowsky (b. 1906 – d. 2002)
- Count Michael Max Leopold Nikolaus Lichnowsky (b. 1907)
