= Albrecht Roscher =

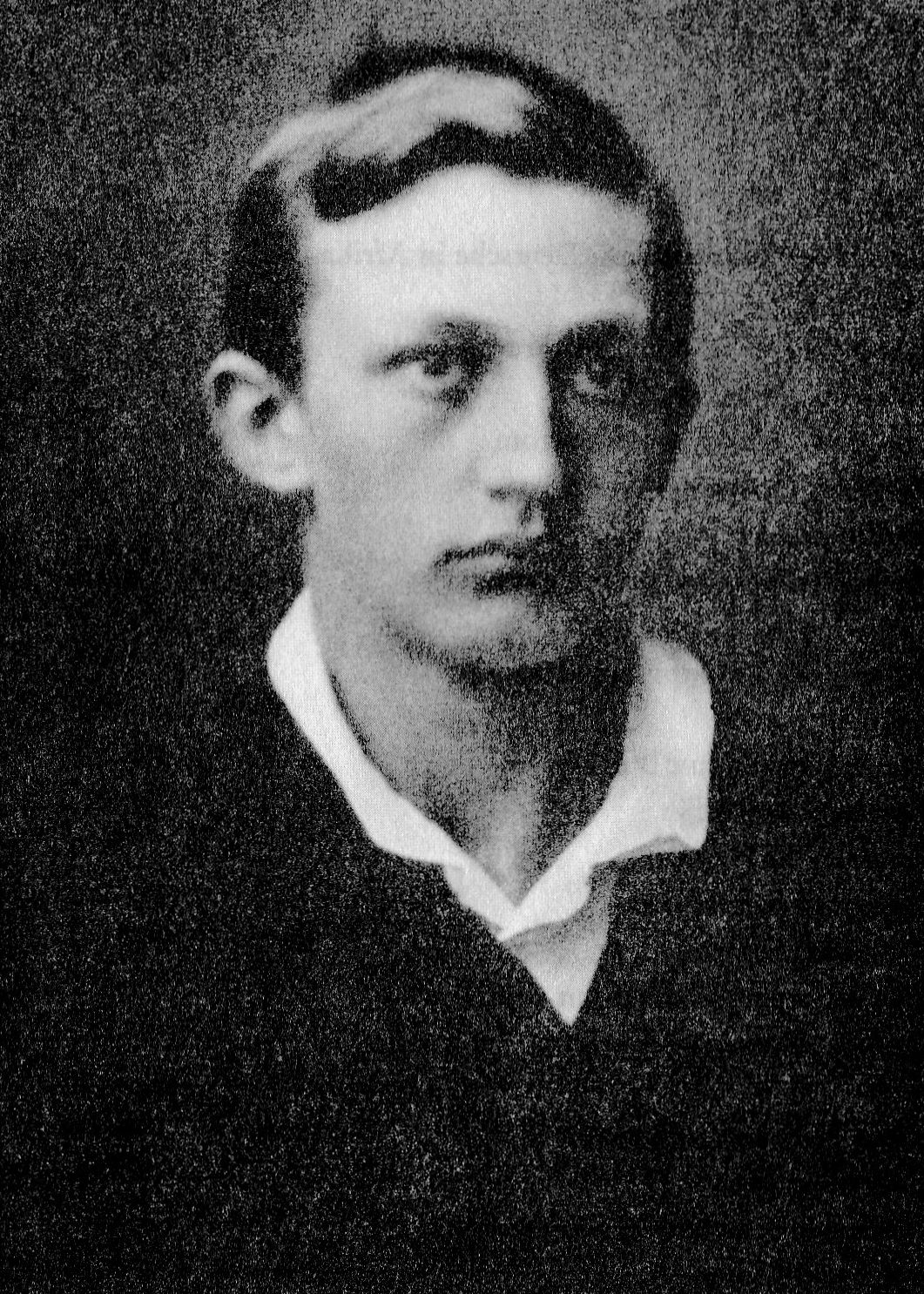
Albrecht Roscher

Albrecht Roscher (August 27, 1836 – March 19, 1860) was a German explorer of Africa. He was murdered near Lake Malawi in 1860.

== Life ==
Roscher was born in Ottensen on August 27, 1836. He attended grammar school at the Gelehrtenschule des Johanneums in Hamburg and then went on to study geography, science and medicine at the University of Leipzig. In his 1857 dissertation, "Ptolemy and the trade routes in Central Africa", Roscher, with goal of pinpointing the source of the Nile, used information gleaned from Ptolemy's map of the world to reconstruct the geography of Central Africa. This achievement attracted the interest of eminent geographers such as Heinrich Barth, Alexander Humboldt, Carl Ritter and August Petermann.

Roscher soon embarked on a multi-year scientific expedition to Africa, arriving in Zanzibar in 1858, where he conducted botanical investigations and learned Swahili. In early 1859, he traveled down the coastline of what is now mainland Tanzania, exploring the waters around modern-day Dar es Salaam and charting the Rufiji delta. In June he landed at Kilwa. He remained there for two months while ill. He then joined an Arab slave caravan heading inland, arriving at Lake Malawi in October 1859, two months after the famed British explorer David Livingstone.

On departing the shores of Lake Malawi in March 1860, Roscher was attacked and killed. There is speculation that his death resulted from Arab slave traders' fears that he would expose the practices of the Arab slave trade. His journals along with his geographical and anthropological observations were lost.
