= Johannes Classen =

German educator and classical philologist

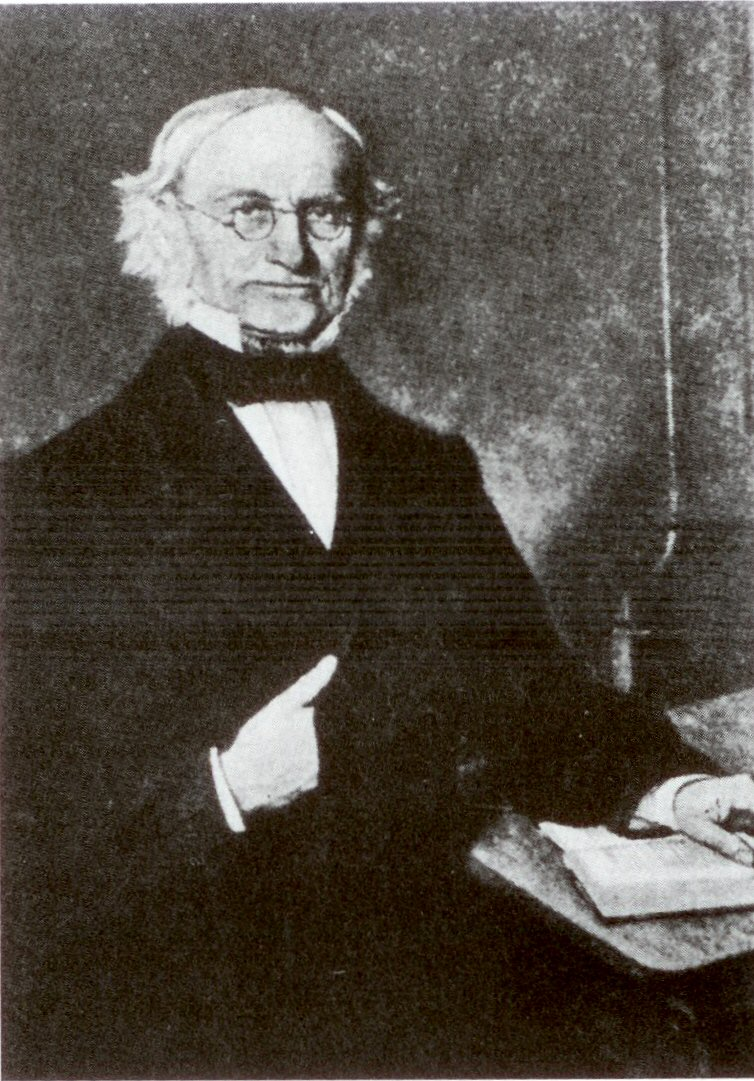
Johannes Classen (1805-1891)

Johannes Classen (21 November 1805, Hamburg – 31 August 1891, Hamburg) was a German educator and classical philologist.

Classen was educated at the Gelehrtenschule des Johanneums. He studied philology at the University of Leipzig, afterwards continuing his education at Bonn, where he was a student of Barthold Georg Niebuhr. From 1827 he lived in the home of Niebuhr, whose son Marcus was tutored by Classen. After the death of Niebuhr on 2 January 1831, and of his wife nine days later, Classen took care of his former teacher's three children.

In 1829 he received his habilitation at Bonn, and in 1832 served as an assistant at the Joachimsthalsche Gymnasium in Berlin. During the following year he became a professor at the Katharineum zu Lübeck. In 1853 he was appointed director of the municipal gymnasium (secondary school) in Frankfurt am Main, returning in 1864 to Hamburg, where he served as director of the "Johanneum" school till his retirement in 1874.

Classen's most extensive literary effort was an eight-volume publication on the works of Thucydides (Thukydides, 1862–1889). He was also author of an 1859 biography on Renaissance humanist Jacob Micyllus.
