= Carl August Schröder =

German lawyer and politician

August Schröder
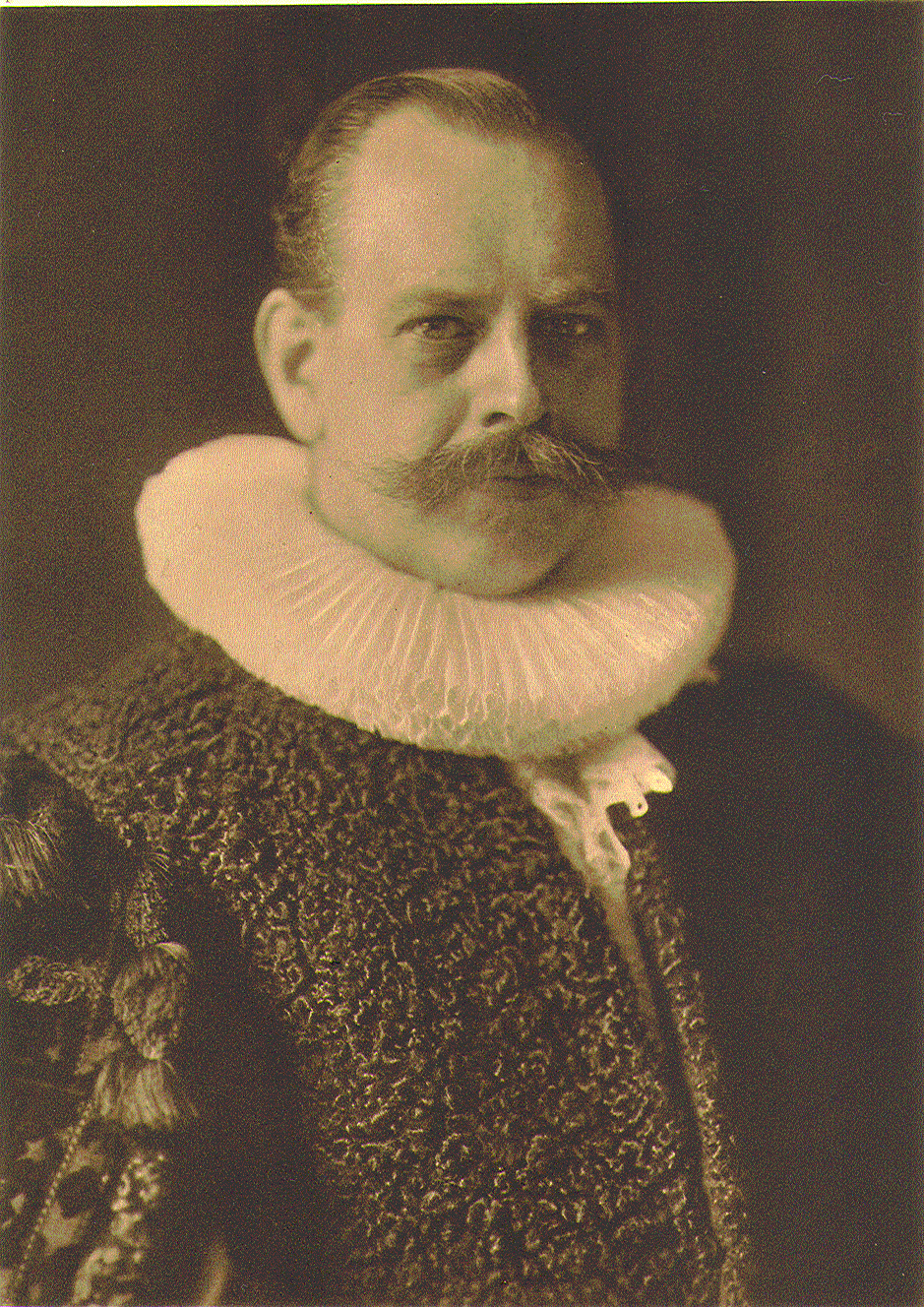
- August Schröder in Hamburg senator's ornate, 1905; by Rudolf Dührkoop

Second Mayor of Hamburg
- In office 1 January 1910 – 31 December 1910
- Preceded by: William Henry O'Swald
- Succeeded by: Heinrich Burchard
- In office 1 January 1912 – 13 September 1912
- Preceded by: Heinrich Burchard
- Succeeded by: Max Predöhl
- In office 1 January 1915 – 31 December 1915
- Preceded by: Werner von Melle
- Succeeded by: Max Predöhl
- In office 1 January 1918 – 12 November 1918
- Preceded by: Werner von Melle
- Succeeded by: Soldiers' and Workers' Council
- In office (acting only); 18 November 1918 – 27 March 1919
- Preceded by: Soldiers' and Workers' Council
- Succeeded by: Otto Stolten

First Mayor of Hamburg and President of the Hamburg Senate
- In office 3 September 1912 – 31 December 1913
- Preceded by: Heinrich Burchard
- Succeeded by: Max Predöhl
- In office 1 January 1916 – 31 December 1916
- Preceded by: Werner von Melle
- Succeeded by: Max Predöhl

Personal details
- Born: 21 November 1855 Hamburg
- Died: 3 November 1945 (aged 89) Hamburg
- Party: Nonpartisan; DVP (after 1918)
- Parent(s): Carl August Schröder (1819–1902); Albertina Maria Kellinghusen (1837–1910)
- Education: Leipzig
- Occupation: Lawyer

Carl August Schröder (born 21 November 1855 in Hamburg, died 3 November 1945 in Hamburg) was a Hamburg lawyer and politician, who served as First Mayor of Hamburg in 1916.

A member of the Schröder family, he studied in law in Leipzig, and worked as a lawyer in Hamburg from 1879. In 1886, he was elected to the Hamburg Parliament. He was elected to the Senate of Hamburg in 1899 and served until the elections of 1919, following the political reforms. He served as Second Mayor several times from 1910, and as First Mayor in 1916. He became a member of the liberal German People's Party in 1919. During the Weimar Republic's existence he served as a member of the Hamburg Parliament.
