= Georg Michael Telemann =

German composer and theologian

Georg Michael Telemann (20 April 1748 – 4 March 1831) was a German composer and theologian.

Telemann was born in Plön, the son of the local pastor Andreas Telemann (1715–1755) and his wife Augusta Clara Catharina Capsius. After the death of his father in 1755, he moved to Hamburg, where he was taken in and raised by his then 74-year-old grandfather Georg Philipp Telemann. In Hamburg, he attended the Gelehrtenschule des Johanneums, and from 1770, the Akademisches Gymnasium. On the death of his grandfather in 1767, the 19 year old Georg Michael composed Trauer-Ode auf das betrübte Absterben meines Großvaters Herrn Georg Philipp Telemann, des Hamburgischen Musik-Chor-Direktors. He also filled his grandfather's post as Cantor at the Johanneum and director of music in Hamburg's churches until March 1768, when Carl Philipp Emanuel Bach was appointed. From 1770 to 1772 he studied at the University of Kiel. In 1773, while still in Hamburg, he published a treatise on continuo playing, Unterricht im Generalbaß-Spielen.

In 1773, Georg Michael moved to Riga, where he was appointed as music director of the city churches and cantor at Riga Cathedral. As part of this job, he also directed the performance of twenty-one of his grandfather's passions. He also taught at the cathedral school. In 1812, he published a collection of Chorale settings for organ entitled Sammlung alter und neuer Choral-Melodien and a year later took the position of organist at the cathedral. He retired in 1828 due to a deteriorating eye condition. He died in Riga in 1831.
