= Rondeshagen =

- Municipality
- Coat of arms

- Location of Rondeshagen within Herzogtum Lauenburg district
- Interactive map of Rondeshagen
- Location within Germany Location within Schleswig-Holstein
- Coordinates: 53°45′N 10°38′E
- Country: Germany
- State: Schleswig-Holstein
- District: Herzogtum Lauenburg
- Municipal assoc.: Berkenthin

Government
  - Mayor: Heinz Albrecht

Area
  - Total: 9.51 km^{2} (3.67 sq mi)
- Elevation: 16 m (52 ft)

Population (2025-12-31)
  - Total: 779
  - Density: 81.9/km^{2} (212/sq mi)
- Time zone: UTC+01:00 (CET)
  - Summer (DST): UTC+02:00 (CEST)
- Postal codes: 23919
- Dialling codes: 04501, 04544
- Vehicle registration: RZ
- Website: www.amt-berkenthin.de

Rondeshagen is a municipality in the district of Lauenburg, in Schleswig-Holstein, Germany.
