= Richard Schorr =

German astronomer (1867–1951)

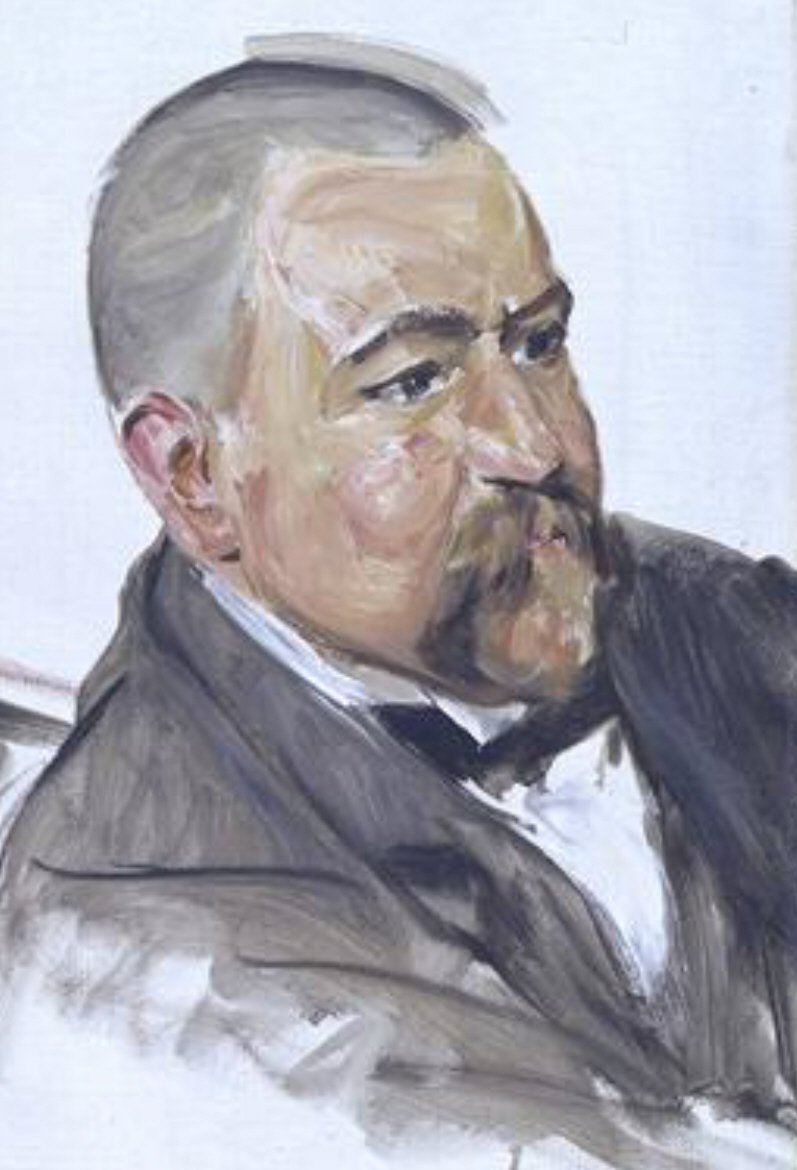
Richard Schorr

Richard Reinhard Emil Schorr (20 August 1867 in Kassel – 21 September 1951 in Badgastein, Salzburg), was a German astronomer, who served as the director of the Hamburger Stemwarte at the end of the 19th century.

== Career ==
From 1889 to 1891, Schorr worked as an assistant editor of Astronomische Nachrichten, at the observatory at Kiel. In 1892 Schorr became observer (observator) at the Hamburger Sternwarte (Hamburg Observatory) Schorr was the director of the Hamburger Sternwarte (Hamburg Observatory). The former director George Rümker had started the movement of the observatory to the outer parts of Hamburg but became seriously ill and died in 1899. After Rümker's death, Schorr became director, and the building of Germany's second largest observatory in Hamburg-Bergedorf became his task. The new observatory opened in 1912.

Schorr's main interests had been star positions (astrometry), proper motion of stars and solar eclipse observations. Schorr initiated many catalog projects (most popular is the AGK2). From 1905 to 1928 Schorr organized 8 big expeditions to observe solar eclipses at different parts in the world. At 7 he took part himself.

The observations for the AGK2 took place between 1913 and 1920. Several astronomers at Hamburg observatory took more than 1700 photographic plates. After measuring the plates Schorr and the Danish astronomer Holger Thiele used them too for searching and position determination of comets and asteroids. They discovered 30 new asteroids and one new comet, D/1918 W1 (Schorr), during this time.

Under Schorr's directorship the optician Bernhard Schmidt got rooms and time to experiment with new optical assemblies. Schmidt constructed several new telescope constructions for the observatory. In 1930 Schmidt invented the Schmidt camera, a telescope with a very wide field of view and free from image elongations in the plate edges far from the optical axis. Schorr urged Schmidt to build the first Schmidt Camera at Bergedorf observatory.

In 1937 Nazi Germany Schorr had to resign the directorship due to his age. His first choice candidate as his follower was Walter Baade who refused because of better astronomical working conditions at the Californian Mount Wilson Observatory and Palomar Observatory which was under construction. In spite of the wishes of Nazi organisations Schorr could call Otto Heckmann as his follower in 1941.

== Personal life and death ==
In 1951, he died in Badgastein, Salzburg.

== Honors and awards ==
The lunar crater Schorr and the asteroid 1235 Schorria are named after him.

Asteroid 725 Amanda is named after his wife, Amanda.

== Literature ==
- J. Schramm, Sterne über Hamburg - Die Geschichte der Astronomie in Hamburg, 2nd edition, Kultur- & Geschichtskontor, Hamburg 2010, ISBN 978-3-9811271-8-8
