= Caroline Daur =

German fashion blogger

- Caroline Daur at the 76th Berlin International Film Festival
- Born: Katharina Caroline Daur; 12 March 1995 (age 31); Hamburg, Germany
- Years active: 2014–present
- Modeling information
- Hair color: Blonde
- Eye color: Blue

TikTok information
- Page: carodaur
- Followers: 1.1 million
- Last updated: 28 January 2026

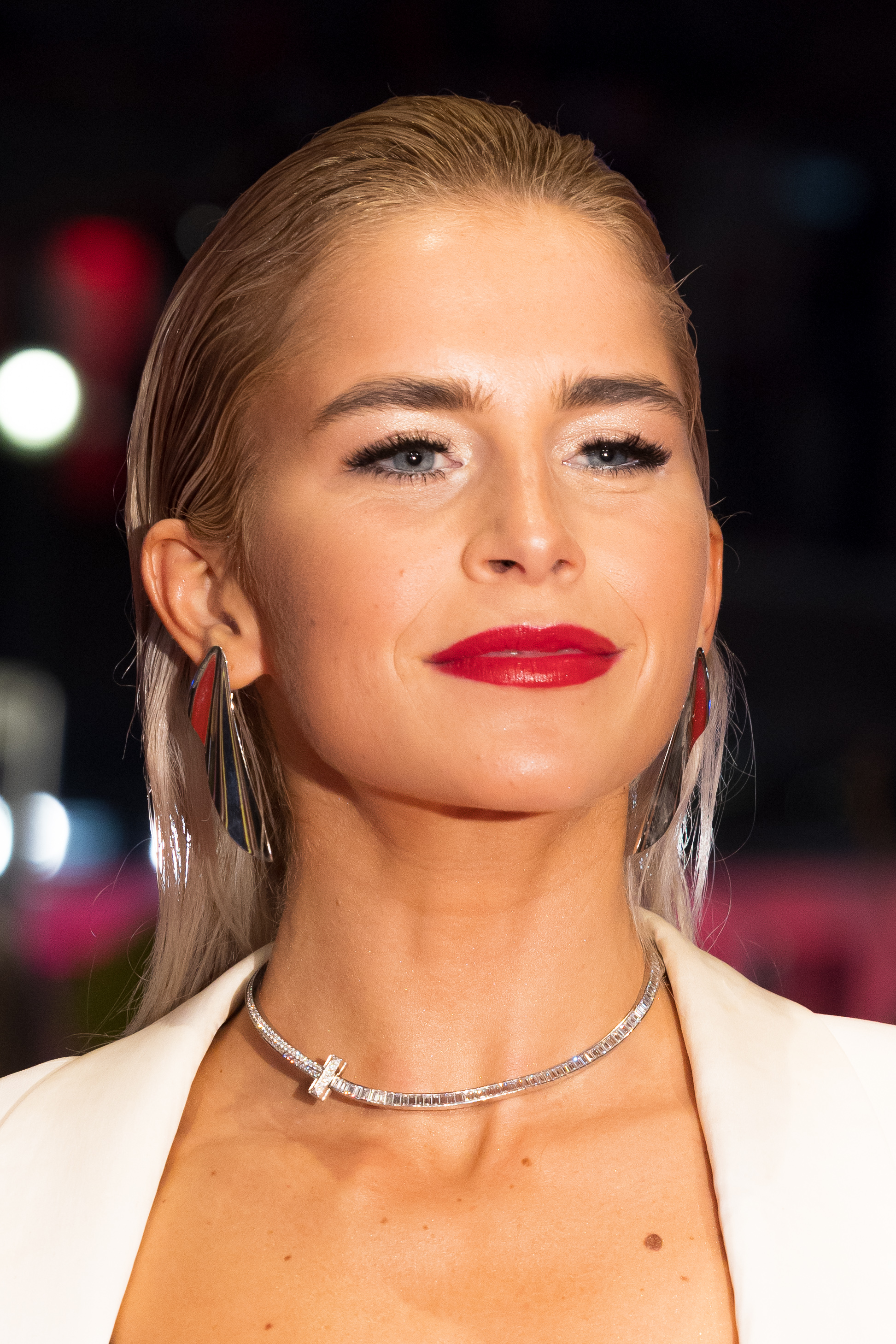
Daur in 2024

Katharina Caroline "Caro" Daur (born 12 March 1995) is a German fashion influencer and model.

== Biography ==
Daur was born on 12 March 1995 in Hamburg, Germany and grew up in Seevetal. She began fashion blogging in 2014, launching CaroDaur.com. Since the start of her blog, she has become a notable international fashion influencer. Through her blog, she has partnered with companies like Adidas, Dolce & Gabbana, Fendi or Valentino. She also worked on global campaigns for MAC Cosmetics, APM, and Dolce & Gabbana.

In 2015, she was a recipient of the New Faces Award by Bunte in the fashion digital category. In May 2017, she was honored as an Idol of the Year at the About You Awards.

Daur released the Boss curated by Caro Daur collection in fall 2020 in cooperation with Hugo Boss. With Adidas and Zalando, she released a period leggings in 2021.

In addition to fashion, Daur is also a fitness influencer and has been publishing workout videos on the video platform YouTube since October 2019. In 2020, she wrote the e-book "DaurPower".

== Reception ==
Daur was named "one of the most influential Germans" by the trade magazine Werben und Verkaufen in 2017.

In 2017, Daur reportedly received a warning and subjected to a tax audit for violating the advertising labeling requirement on a sponsored post. During the time, Manager Magazin conducted an interview with her, in which Daur evaded answering questions regarding sponsored content and the labeling requirement for her advertising.

According to Statista, she was the fashion influencer with the second most followers on Instagram in Germany in 2017 - after Leonie Hanne. In 2021, Daur ranked third among the most valuable influencers - after Hanne and Pamela Reif.
