= Education in Hamburg =

Overview of education in the German city-state of Hamburg

Ministry of Schools and Vocational Training (Behörde für Schule und Berufsbildung) Ministry of Science and Research (Behörde für Wissenschaft und Forschung)
- State Minister for Schools and Vocational Training State Minister of Science and Research: Ties Rabe Katharina Fegebank

General details
- Primary languages: German
- System type: State

Enrollment
- Total: 167,714 (2007) primary and secondary school
- As of 2009

Education in Hamburg covers the whole spectrum from kindergarten, primary education, secondary education, and higher education in Hamburg. The German states are primarily responsible for the educational system in Germany, and therefore the Behörde für Schule und Berufsbildung (State Ministry of Schools and Vocational training) is the administrative agency in Hamburg. The Behörde für Wissenschaft und Forschung (State Ministry of Science and Research) has the oversight for universities and colleges.

The UNESCO Institute for Lifelong Learning, one of the six educational institutes of UNESCO, is located in Hamburg.

== History ==
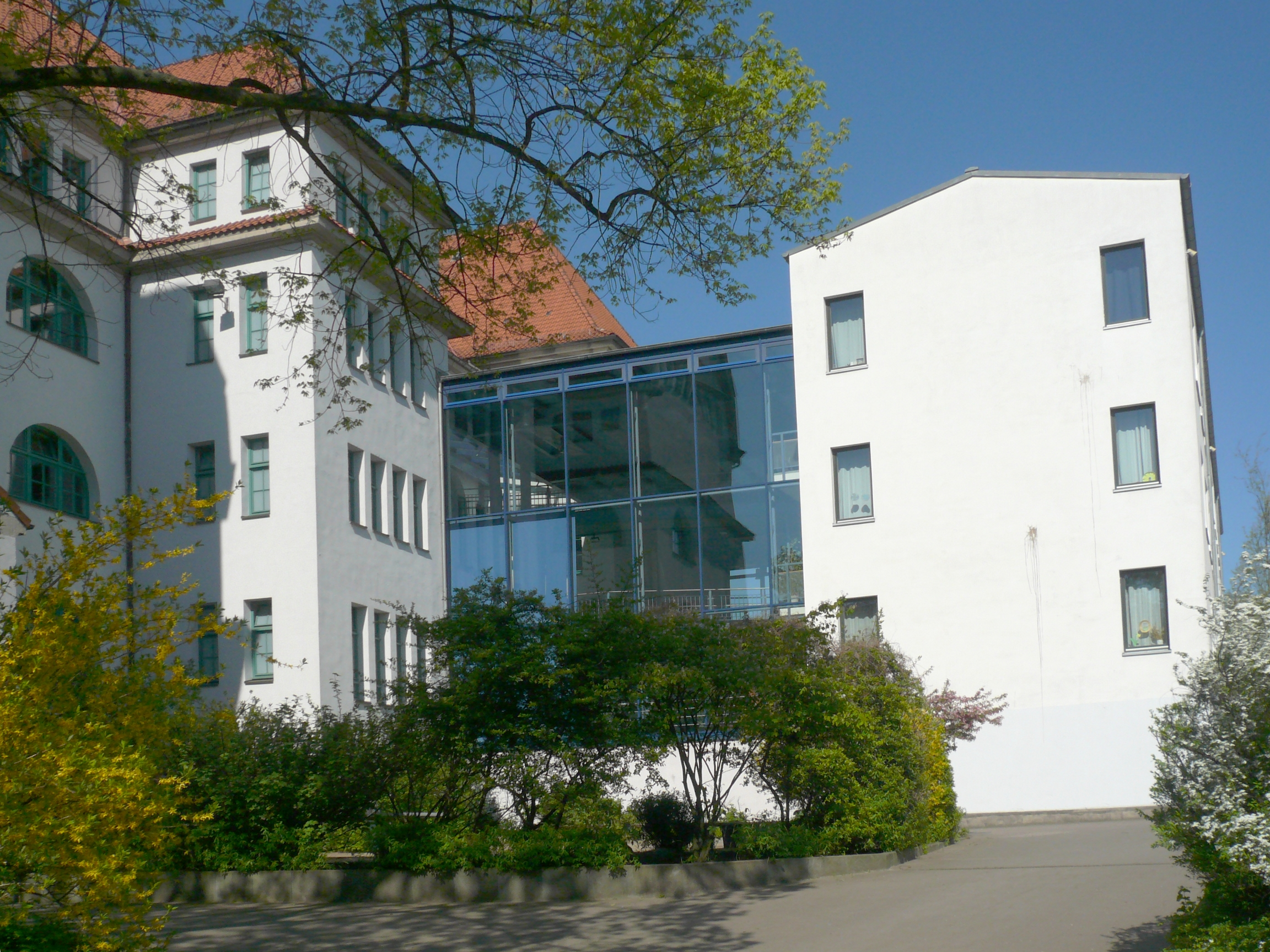
Gesamtschule Eppendorf, a Hamburg comprehensive school

Per student no other State of Germany spends more money on education than Hamburg. Yet at the Programme for International Student Assessment the students did very poorly and were outperformed by 14 other States of Germany. Only the State of Bremen did worse than Hamburg. One in two Hamburg children comes from an immigrant family, and in 2007, 20.4 percent of all Hamburg children were on welfare.

=== Failed 2009 reform attempt ===
In 2008-mid 2009, several types of secondary schools existed in Hamburg. The most common types were Hauptschulen, Realschulen, Gymnasium (prep schools) and Gesamtschulen (comprehensive schools). Children completed primary school after four years and were allowed to apply for any of those schools. The choice which school to apply for was made by the parents.

In October 2009, the Hamburg Parliament voted for an act to change this system with the start of the educational year 2010/11. The Grundschule—primary school of 4 years education from the age of 6 to 10—would be changed into a Primärschule (lit. primary school), lasting 6 years. This would be followed by a so-called location or quarter school (German: Stadtteilschule) with certificates, like the Abitur after 13 years of education. The Gymnasium will offer the Abitur after 12 years. Pupils could enter the Stadteilschule or the Gymnasium. Parents would no longer be allowed to choose if their child should apply for a Gymnasium. Only those children whose primary school teachers state that the child would make a successful transition into a Gymnasium would be allowed to apply. The act also states that no more than 25 pupils are allowed in classes of the primary school, 20 in so-called difficult quarters, and not more than 28 in a Gymnasium class. This decision was criticized by factions of the SPD and The Left.

Many people were not pleased by this educational reform. Some were dismayed that the reform did not do away with Gymnasium which they saw as a breeding ground of privilege. It has been noted that most of the students attending a Gymnasium came from upper-middle-class families and that Gymnasium often failed to enroll children from minority backgrounds. A movement called Eine Schule für alle (One school for everyone) was formed. The movement attempted to collect enough signatures to force a referendum, but fell short of the required number to do so. Many parents of those attending a Realschule were dismayed that this type of school was abolished. Another group of parents was dismayed that the decision of whether their kids should apply for a Gymnasium was no longer left to the parents. They also were concerned about the fact that Gymnasium would no longer be allowed to enroll students after fourth grade, but had to wait until they graduated from sixth grade. These would mean Gymnasium would get two fewer years to impart Latin and Ancient Greek. It was also feared that if Gymnasium would not be able to enroll students as young as ten years, it would become difficult for them to instill school spirit and love for learning in the students. It was also claimed that the academically most promising children were denied an adequate education if they were not allowed to enroll in a Gymnasium after four years of schooling. A movement called Wir wollen lernen! (We want to learn!) was formed. It collected 184.500 signatures in November, three times the number needed to force a referendum.

An attempt by the city government of Hamburg to have all pupils attend the same school until 7th grade was, however, rejected by 276,304 votes to 218,065 German television showed that the voter participation was higher in the wealthy neighbourhoods than in the poor ones. The opinion was put forward that the referendum to reject the school reforms was only successful because of this. In fact, although the proposal in Hamburg was to have all children in a single school system two years longer in order to treat everyone equally for a longer time, German TV found a number of wealthy parents willing to make statements to TV cameras that they considered such equal treatment unfair: "you don't have to disadvantage the socially advantaged so that the disadvantaged benefit". In other words, putting everyone in the same school is considered unfair by many of the wealthy in Germany.

== General education ==
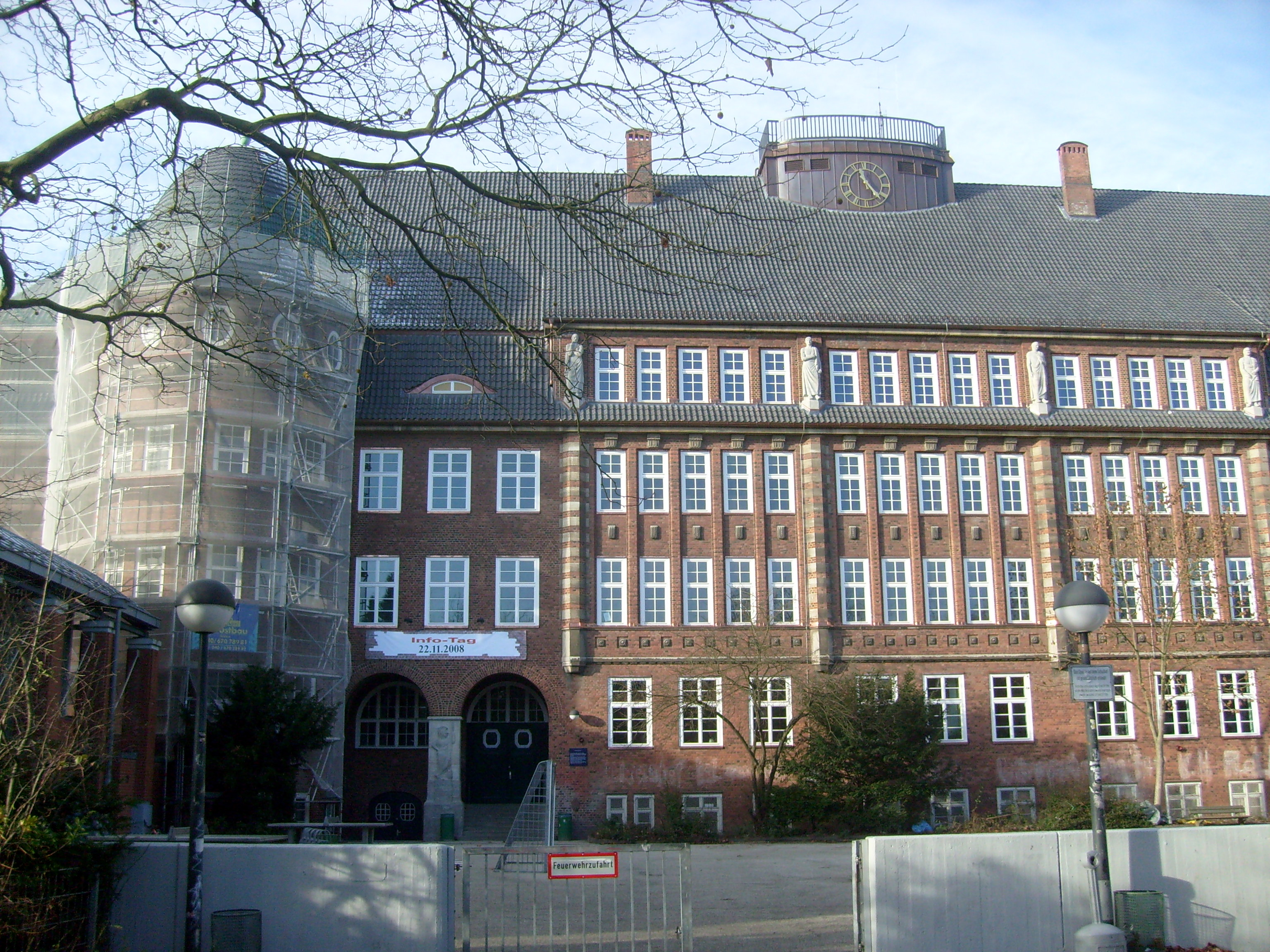
Hansa-Gymnasium Hamburg, in the Bergedorf borough, built 1912 to 1914 by Fritz Schumacher

Besides regular German schools and kindergarten, an International School of Hamburg exists that offers education from kindergarten up until the International Baccalaureate. Hamburg also has a French kindergarten and primary school, the École Française de Hambourg. The French-German secondary school DFG Hamburg prepares students for the French-German Baccalaureate.

In 2007, there were 1,039 day-care centers for children, 244 primary schools, and (in 2006) 195 secondary schools, with a total of 167,714 pupils. As of 2009 several Hamburg schools were Wilhelm-Gymnasium (Hamburg), Christianeum Hamburg, Friedrich-Ebert-Gymnasium, Gymnasium Farmsen, and Helene-Lange-Gymnasium. Hamburg's oldest school is the Gelehrtenschule des Johanneums.

== Higher education ==
As of 2026, 7 public institutions and 13 private universities and colleges were located in Hamburg with about 90,000 university students, including 10,000 international students.

=== Universities ===
Universities in Hamburg are:

- University of Hamburg
- Hamburg University of Technology
- HafenCity University (founded in 2006)
- Hochschule für bildende Künste Hamburg (College of Fine Arts Hamburg)
- Helmut Schmidt University is the University of the German Bundeswehr
- Bucerius Law School is a private law school with university status
- University Medical Campus Hamburg (UMCH) in Bahrenfeld (established in 2019), is the German branch of the Romanian University of Medicine, Pharmacy, Science and Technology of Târgu Mureș
- SRH University - Campus Hamburg

=== Colleges ===
There are a number of colleges without university status (see Fachhochschule) in Hamburg as well:

- Hamburg University of Applied Sciences
- Hochschule für Musik und Theater Hamburg
- HSBA Hamburg School of Business Administration
- Northern Institute of Technology
- AMD Academy of Fashion and Design
- Kühne Logistics University
- Brand University of Applied Sciences

There are also a number of colleges below the Fachhochschule level.

=== Research institutions ===
- Archaeological Institute
- Aviation and Space Psychology Department of the Institute for Aerospace Medicine, German Aerospace Center (Deutsches Zentrum für Luft- und Raumfahrt, Institut für Luft- und Raumfahrtmedizin, Abteilung Luft- und Raumfahrtpsychologie)
- Bernhard Nocht Institute for Tropical Medicine
- Biozentrum Grindel und Zoologisches Museum website
- DESY (Deutsches Elektronen Synchrotron)
  - Hadron Elektron Ring Anlage (defunct)
- Heinrich Pette Institute for Experimental Virology and Immunology
- Zentrum für Molekulare Neurobiologie Hamburg – Centre for Molecular Neurobiology Hamburg
- Hamburg-Bergedorf Observatory
- Max Planck Institute for Meteorology
