= Arissa Khan =

Indian model, beauty queen, entrepreneur (born 1994)

- Born: 23 March 1994 (age 32); Mumbai, Maharashtra, India
- Education: Jaihind College
- Alma mater: National College
- Occupations: Model, entrepreneur
- Height: 1.73 m (5 ft 8 in)
- Beauty pageant titleholder
- Hair color: Light brown
- Eye color: Light brown

Arissa Khan is an entrepreneur, Miss India pageant winner and luxury fashion influencer.

== Early life ==
Khan was born in Mumbai, India to a Muslim family and was the first Femina Miss Campus Princess 2014 India.
