= Northern Institute of Technology Management =

Educational institute in Hamburg, Germany

Coordinates: 53°27′45″N 9°58′10″E

Northern Institute of Technology Management gGmbH
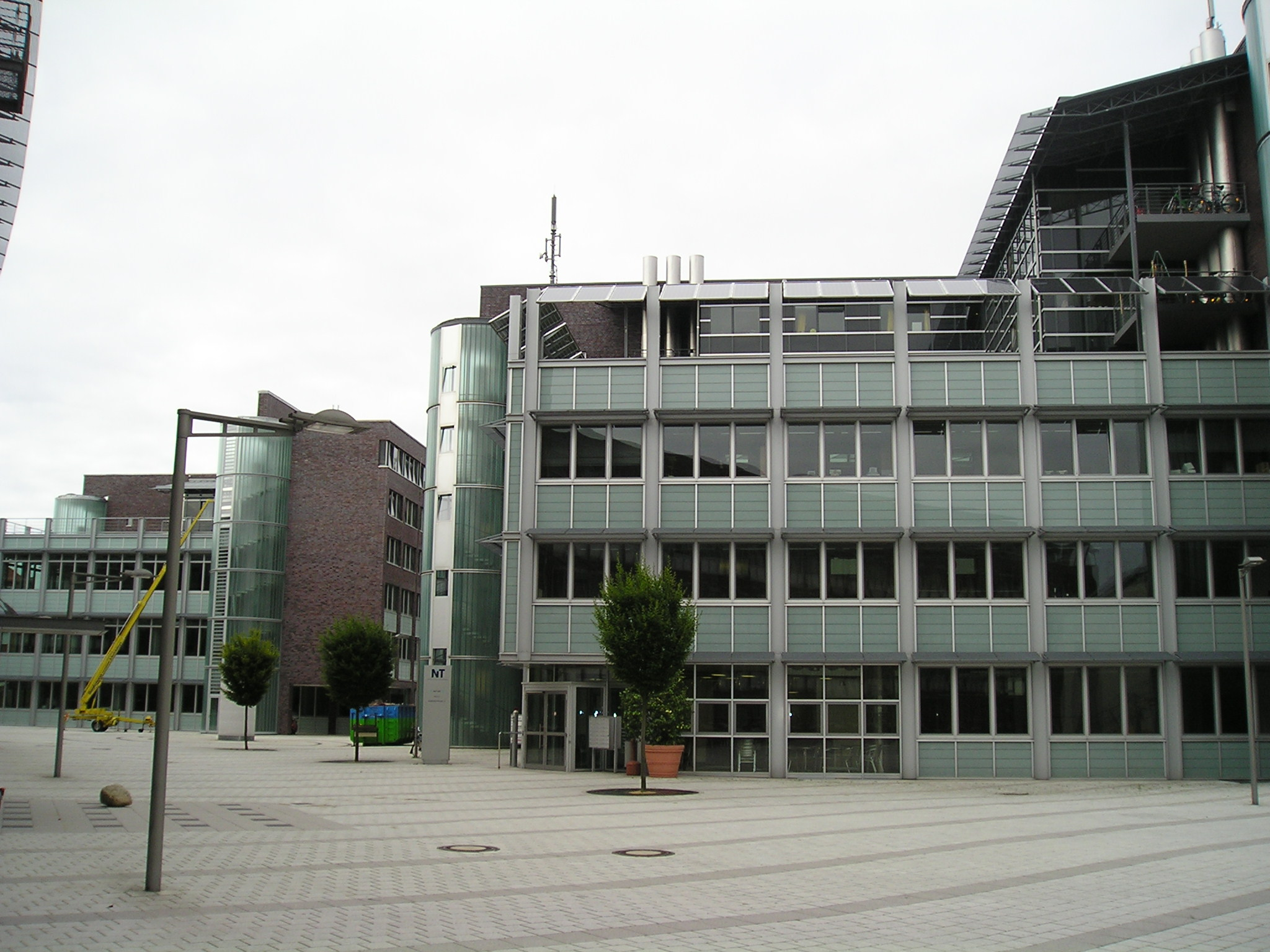
- Northern Institute of Technology Management Campus
- Motto: "Be the Change"
- Type: Private Business School
- Established: 1998
- President of the NIT: Prof. Dr.-Ing. Otto von Estorff
- Faculty: 30 (including visiting professors)
- Postgraduates: 70
- Location: Hamburg, Germany
- CEO: Dr. Klemens Kleiminger
- Website: www.nithh.de

The Northern Institute of Technology Management (NIT) is an educational institute located in Hamburg. The institute was founded in 1998 by 40 professors of the Hamburg University of Technology TUHH. The first president of the NIT was the renowned scientist and former president of the TUHH, Hauke Trinks. The institute was originally founded with the name „Northern Institute of Technology“, which was extended with the addition of „Management“ in December 2007.

International Engineers, scientists, and graduates of business-related studies complete the program at the NIT and learn to master leadership and management tasks responsibly and sustainably. The NIT's motto is “BE THE CHANGE”. The institute offers an English-language master's program in Technology Management (M.A. and MBA) as well as various professional training courses and workshops.

== Study program ==
The study program Technology Management is accredited by the Foundation for International Business Administration Accreditation (FIBAA) and the Deutschen Akkreditierungsrat and is an official study program of the Hamburg University of Technology TUHH. The program takes approximately 24 to 30 months to finish and is completed entirely in the English language. The institute educates German and international students to become technology managers. Every October, between 25 and 37 students start the Technology Management study program and graduate with a Master or an MBA. There are several options for the NIT study program:

- as a Master with the degree of Master of Arts (M.A.) or Master of Business Administration (MBA) in part-time
- as a double master (M.A. oder MBA) in combination with an M.Sc. in engineering or natural sciences from the Hamburg University of Technology (TUHH)
- as a certificate program with the certificate of “Innovation Manager“

Regardless of the desired degree or certificate, the center point of the program is the “MyProject“ module path. In MyProject, students develop an entrepreneurial mindset to set up their projects, which are refined throughout the entire program and can be expanded into their business ideas. The NIT works with a “Flying Faculty". The lecturers are from international universities or companies and are employed by the NIT only for their individual modules.

== Further education ==
In addition to the master's program in technology management, the NIT offers professional training since 2014. Employees and managers can attend further educational workshops, lectures, and multi-day seminars, as well as book in-house programs for companies. Under the name “NIT Toolbox“, the educational institute offers training in the areas of new technologies, digital competence, innovative methods, and people & culture. The topics that are covered in these workshops include digitalization, global management, new leadership, entrepreneurship, and design thinking, among others. Participants learn to assess and implement topics like digital transformation or IT security.

== Hamburg Economic Dialog ==
Since January 2017, the NIT has hosted the quarterly Hamburg Economic Dialog. This series of events regularly invites executives and entrepreneurs to talk about the working world of the future. Topics such as Industry 4.0, 3-D printing, IT safety, and blockchain have already been discussed, among others. This free event takes place in alternating locations and in the form of an open forum.

== Hauke Trinks Award ==
Hauke Trinks was the former president of the Hamburg University of Technology (TUHH) and founded the Northern Institute of Technology Management in 1998. With the "Hauke Trinks Award", the NIT wants to reward outstanding student work and at the same time honour the legacy of the researcher and scientist. The prize was awarded in 2018 for the first time and is aimed at Bachelor students from Hamburg's universities in the STEM fields who have achieved outstanding results in their final thesis, demonstrated a high degree of scientific curiosity and pursued original and interdisciplinary approaches to gaining scientific knowledge.

== Building ==
The building is located on the campus of the Hamburg University of Technology in Hamburg-Harburg. Most of the NIT students live right in the building, which houses over 65 apartments. On the wall in the foyer, an artwork by the Austrian concept artist Peter Friedl deals with the theme “nobody knows science”. In the building, rooms can be rented for conferences, conventions, and workshops: the NIT offers various working spaces in Hamburg-Harburg, including seminar and conference rooms, a design thinking room, and offices.

== Executive board ==
The supervisory board appoints the executives and supervises the executive board of the NIT. It is headed by Norbert Basler.

== See also ==
- Hamburg University of Technology
- Education in Hamburg
- DAAD Deutscher Akademischer Austausch Dienst (German Academic Exchange Service)
