= Leonie Hanne =

German fashion influencer

- Hanne in 2026
- Born: 31 July 1988 (age 38); Hamburg, Germany
- Education: HSBA Hamburg School of Business Administration
- Occupations: influencer, blogger, model
- Spouse: Alexander Galievsky

TikTok information
- Page: leoniehanne
- Followers: 1.6M
- Last updated: 17 September 2026
- Website: ohhcouture.com

Leonie Hanne (born 31 July 1988) is a German fashion influencer, blogger, model, and social media entrepreneur.

== Biography ==
Hanne was born and raised in Hamburg. She has degrees in business, fashion, and textile management from HSBA Hamburg School of Business Administration.

She worked as a strategy consultant for German online trailer Otto GmbH, doing supply chain management in Hong Kong. She quit her corporate job in 2014 to launch her blog, Ohh Couture. With photographer Alexander Galievsky, she has collaborated with fashion brands including Tommy Hilfiger, Dior, Cartier, BVLGARI, and Tory Burch. She has fronted global campaigns for Louis Vuitton, La Mer, Pandora, and Tommy Hilfiger and partnered with Fendi, Swarovski, Givenchy, Chloé, Net-A-Porter, H&M, and Sarenza.

Hanne is represented by Storm Management and has walked the runway for Rebecca Minkoff during New York Fashion Week. She has been featured on the cover of MINE, ARCADIA, Velvet, Gala Styke, L'Officiel Arabia, and Cosmopolitan Germany. She had dedicated features in Vogue Germany, ELLE Russia, and Marie Claire UK.

Hanne partnered with Ideal of Sweden to design a line of iPhone cases called Un hommage à Paris.

A social media influencer, she has over 4.5 million followers on Instagram and over 400,000 followers on TikTok. She also serves as an ambassador for amfAR, The Foundation for AIDS Research. She is part of Bold Management, Milan-based influencer agency.

Hanne married her business partner, Alexander Galievsky, in June of 2026. They split their time between apartments in London and Hamburg.

During the full-scale Russian invasion of Ukraine, which is part of Russian-Ukrainian war, expressed support for Ukraine and joined the #StandWithUkraine movement.
