= HSBA Hamburg School of Business Administration =

- Motto in English: Your Business School in Hamburg
- Type: Business school
- Established: 2004
- Chancellor: Alexander Freier
- President: Prof. Dr. Tim Goydke
- Managing Director: Tim Goydke & Alexander Freier
- Faculty: 32
- Students: 1000
- Location: Hamburg, Germany
- Address: Willy-Brandt-Straße 75; 20459 Hamburg; Germany
- Colours: Blue and White
- Nickname: HSBA
- Website: www.hsba.de/en

HSBA Hamburg School of Business Administration is a private business school located in Hamburg, Germany. Founded by Hamburg Chamber of Commerce in 2004, HSBA now cooperates with more than 300 companies. As a state-recognised third-level institution, it offers bachelor’s and master’s degrees in business as cooperative education (in German: "dual") and part-time courses for 1000 students. HSBA's Cooperative Education Model has its origin in Germany's dual education system which was applied to university level.

== Structure ==
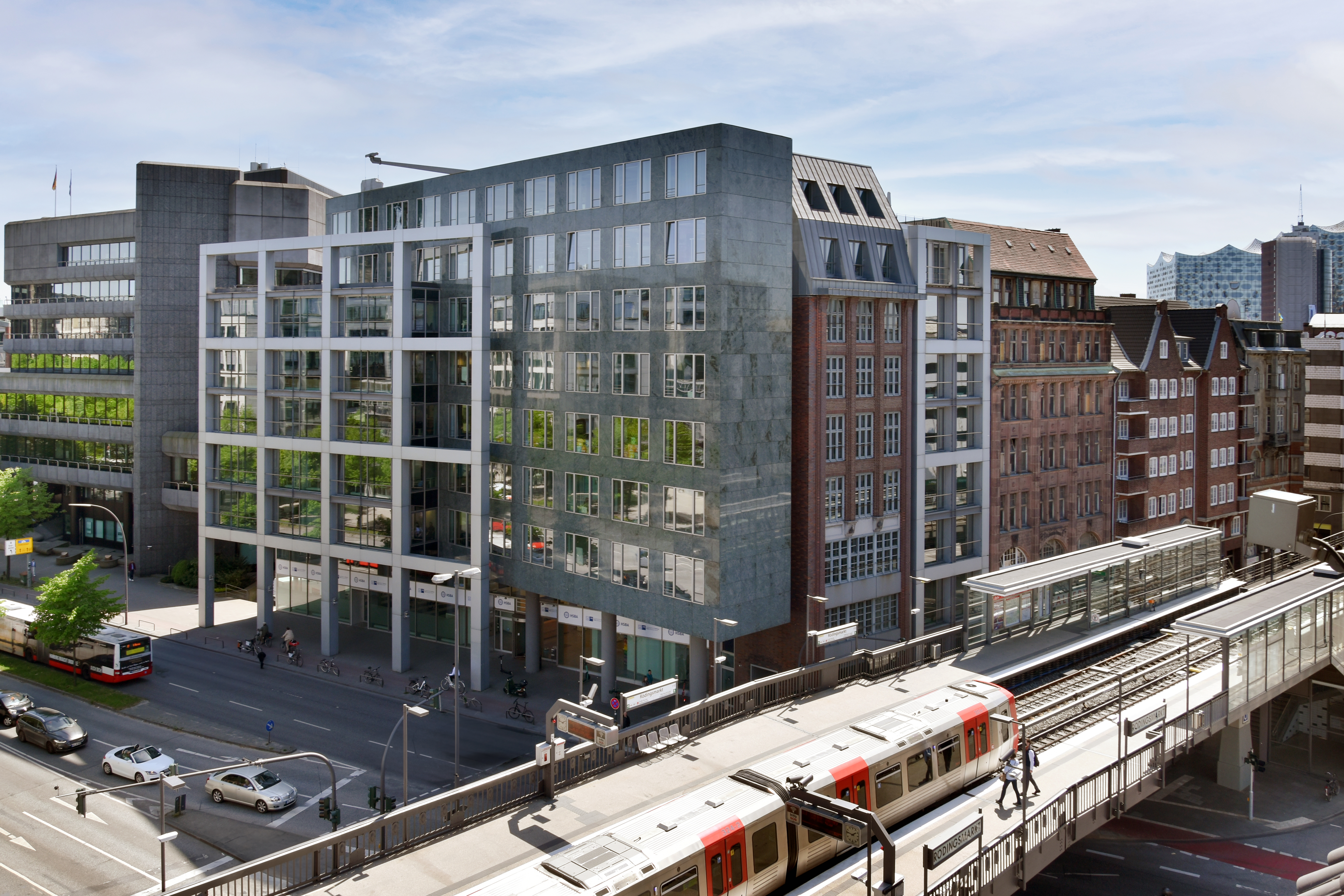
HSBA Campus in the heart of Hamburg.

HSBA is composed of various departments and institutes:

- Departments: Strategy & Leadership, Marketing & Sales, Medien & IT, Maritime Business School, Finance & Accounting and Applied Economics.
- Institutes: Hamburg Institute of Family Owned Business, Hamburg Institute of Management and Finance, Hamburg Institute of Risk and Insurance, Hamburg Institute of Banking

== Bachelor Programmes ==
HSBA offers five dual and one part-time Bachelor programmes:

- BSc Business Administration
- BSc Business Informatics
- BSc International Management
- BSc Logistics Management

The dual programmes are three year courses and have been developed together with the cooperating companies. According to the cooperative education model students spend alternate semesters of academic study with semesters of full-time employment in their company. Students receive a monthly salary, and most of the cooperating companies take over (part of) the tuition fees. Business Administration, Business Informatics and Media Management & Communication are taught partly in German (75%) and English (25%). International Management and Logistics Management are entirely taught in English.

== Master Programmes ==
HSBA offers two Master programmes:

- MSc Innovation Management
- MBA Master of Business Administration

HSBA's study programmes are accredited by the FIBAA Foundation for International Business Administration Accreditation. HSBA has also been granted higher educational accreditation by the German Council of Science and Humanities.

== International Partner Institutions ==
HSBA cooperates with the following universities:

Country (City)	Partner University	Type of Cooperation	Agreement Type
Austria (Innsbruck)	MCI Management Center Innsbruck	Student and Staff Exchange	Erasmus+
United Kingdom (Edinburgh)	Edinburgh Napier University	Cooperative Doctorates and Study Abroad	MoU - Bilateral Partnership Agreement
United Arab Emirates (Dubai)	University of Dubai	Study Abroad	MoU - Bilateral Partnership Agreement
USA (Syracuse)	State University of New York at Oswego	Study Abroad and Exchange	MoU - Bilateral Partnership Agreement
USA (Selinsgrove)	Sigmund Weis School of Business (Susquehanna University)	Study Abroad	MoU - Bilateral Partnership Agreement
USA (Chicago)	DePaul University	Executive Guest Lectures and Study Abroad	MoU - Bilateral Partnership Agreement
Hungary (Budapest)	Andrássy University Budapest	Staff Exchange	Erasmus+
Hungary (Budapest)	Budapest University of Economics and Business	Student Exchange	Erasmus+
Turkey (Istanbul)	Turkish-German University	Student Exchange	Erasmus+
Turkey (Istanbul)	Yeditepe University	Student Exchange	Erasmus+
Taiwan (Republic of China R.O.C.) (New Taipei City)	National Taipei University	Student Exchange	MoU - Bilateral Partnership Agreement
South Korea (Daejeon)	SolBridge International School of Business (Woosong University)	Student Exchange	MoU - Bilateral Partnership Agreement
Spain (Valencia)	ESIC University Valencia	Student Exchange	Erasmus+
Spain (Pamplona)	ISSA-School of Applied Management (Univ. de Navarra)	Student Exchange	Erasmus+
Spain (Madrid)	ESIC University Madrid	Student Exchange	Erasmus+
Spain (Bilbao)	Cámarabilbao University Business School	Student Exchange	Erasmus+
Spain (Barcelona)	ESIC University Barcelona	Student Exchange	Erasmus+
Spain (Almería)	University de Almería	Student Exchange	Erasmus+
Serbia (Belgrade)	Faculty of Organisational Sciences (Univ.of Belgrade)	Student Exchange	Erasmus+
Switzerland (Bern)	Bern University of Applied Sciences	Student Exchange	Bilateral Partnership Agreement (SEMP)
Poland (Warsaw)	SGH Warsaw School of Economics	Student Exchange	Erasmus+
Norway (Oslo)	BI Norwegian Business School	Student Exchange	Erasmus+
Netherlands (Rotterdam)	Rotterdam Business School	Student Exchange	Erasmus+
Netherlands (Maastricht)	Zuyd University of Applied Sciences	Student Exchange	Erasmus+
Mexico (Guadalajara, Monterrey etc.)	Instituto Tecnológico de Monterrey	Student Exchange	MoU - Bilateral Partnership Agreement
Morocco (Rabat)	Rabat Business School (International University of Rabat)	Student Exchange	MoU Bilateral Partnership Agreement
Lithuania (Vilnius)	ISM University of Management and Economics	Student Exchange	Erasmus+
Croatia (Zagreb)	Algebra University	Student Exchange	Erasmus+
Kazakhstan (Almaty)	Narxoz University	Student Exchange	Erasmus+
Italy (Venice)	Universitá di Venice	Student Exchange	Erasmus+
Italy (Pisa)	Universitá di Pisa	Student Exchange	Erasmus+
India (New Delhi & Guragram)	IILM Undergraduate Business School (IILM University)	Student Exchange	MoU - Bilateral Partnership Agreement
Greece (Athens)	Alba Graduate Business School	Student Exchange	MoU Bilateral Partnership Agreement
Finland (Helsinki)	Haaga-Helia University of Applied Sciences	Student Exchange	Erasmus+
Finland (Helsinki)	Metropolia Business School	Student Exchange	Erasmus+
Costa Rica (San José)	LEAD University	Student Exchange	MoU - Bilateral Partnership Agreement
China (Ningbo)	University of Nottingham Ningbo China	Student Exchange	MoU - Bilateral Partnership Agreement
China (Hong Kong)	The Hang Seng University of Hong Kong	Student Exchange	MoU - Bilateral Partnership Agreement
Brazil (São Paulo)	Escola de Economia de Sáo Paulo da Fundaçáo Getulio Varga	Student Exchange	MoU - Bilateral Partnership Agreement
Belgium (Diepenbeek)	UCLL University of Applied Sciences	Student Exchange	Erasmus+
Argentina (Buenos Aires)	IAE Business School (Universidad Austral)	Student Exchange	MoU - Bilateral Partnership Agreement
Argentina (Buenos Aires)	Universidad Austral	Student Exchange	MoU - Bilateral Partnership Agreement

HSBA has been granted the Erasmus University Charta by the European Commission in 2009.

== Extracurricular Activities ==
Since 2011 the annual HSBA Finance Conference has been organised and carried out by HSBA students as well.

Beyond that, HSBA offers several sport activities in particular Rowing and Field Hockey as well as numerous committees (HSBA Band, Consulting committee, International committee etc.)

== Notable alumni ==
- Leonie Hanne, German fashion influencer and blogger

== See also ==
- Education in Hamburg
