= Sarenza =

French retail shoes and accessories company

- Company type: Joint-stock company
- Industry: Retail
- Founded: September 2005; 20 years ago
- Headquarters: Paris, France
- Area served: Europe
- Key people: Stéphane Treppoz (CEO); Hélène Boulet-Supau (Managing director)
- Products: Shoes, accessories, and beauty products featuring designers and own brand
- Number of employees: More than 200 (2014)
- Parent: Groupe Beaumanoir
- Website: www.sarenza.com

Sarenza is a French e-commerce company that specializes in selling shoes and accessories. Founded in September 2005, the company has its headquarters in Paris and delivers products to 26 European countries. As of 2014, Sarenza had more than 200 employees and carried a variety of brands and styles. The company has expanded throughout Europe since 2009.

== History ==
Sarenza was created in September 2005 with the launch of the French website. The company grew as a result of two investments that totaled six million euros, and it focused on international expansion.

Sarenza was restructured in March 2007 when the three co-founders left the company. Stéphane Treppoz then became the president of Sarenza, and Hélène Boulet-Supau became the managing director. They raised three million Euros to continue the company's growth and maintain its lead position in the market with a new, automatic warehouse near Paris, an internal customer service department, and revised business techniques. One year and a half after the direction change, the company was already profitable.

A new investment of three million Euros was granted in April 2009 to finance Sarenza's international development. Two-thirds of this investment came from personal funds given by Stéphane Treppoz and Hélène Boulet-Supau. On 7 April 2010 at 8:13 p.m, Sarenza.com sold its millionth pair of shoes. In December 2011, Stéphane Treppoz, CEO of Sarenza and Hélène Boulet-Supau, managing director, acquired complete control of Sarenza. At the end of this negotiation, the Sarenza direction controle over 80% of the company's capital. In the beginning of 2012, Sarenza became one of the top 15 e-commerce sites the most visited in France, published by FEVAD (Fédération d’e-commerce et vente à distance) and Médiamétrie with 3.8 million unique visitors on average per month during the 1st quarter of 2012.

In June 2014, Sarenza received an investment of 74 million Euros to increase its international expansion, the largest investment in French e-commerce history to that date. The funds were primarily given by the French Public Investment Bank, the BPI.

=== Sarenza begins international expansion ===
The first international opening in October 2009 was the British website for customers living in the United Kingdom. The Italian and German websites followed in December 2010. Then, in the first trimester of 2011, Sarenza arrived in Spain and the Netherlands. In March 2012, a new wave of openings occurred with the launch of the Polish website and the European website, permitting delivery to numerous countries in northern and eastern Europe.

== Business Model ==
Sarenza is the first French "pure player" shoe retailer based on the model of the American company Zappos, the largest online shoe retailer in the world.

The concept has remained the same since Sarenza's creation: the strategy is based on the selection (with over 650 brands and 45,000 styles of shoes and accessories offered for men, women, and children) and customer service:

- Free delivery and returns with no minimum spend amount via Hermes
- 100 days to exchange or return an item for free

== Infrastructure ==
Sarenza's headquarters and offices are located in the center of Paris. All orders delivered to France and throughout Europe are shipped from the warehouse in Réau, which is managed by XPO Logistics, Sarenza's logistics partner since 2016.

== Recognition ==
Sarenza has received awards since its creation including:

- The prize of "Best fashion website" during the 5th "Nuit des Favori", or "Night of favorites", organized by FEVAD at the end of 2011
- The "Great Place to Work" ranking in January 2012 and the "Jury favorite" prize from FEVAD also in 2012.
- Its first international prize,"Best foreign website" in the Madrid e-Commerce Awards in 2012
- "Best international online store" in September 2012 during the e-Awards Duo in Madrid
- "Best online fashion site" by FEVAD in France in November 2012
