= Gymnasium Farmsen =

Coordinates: 53°36′44″N 10°6′32″E

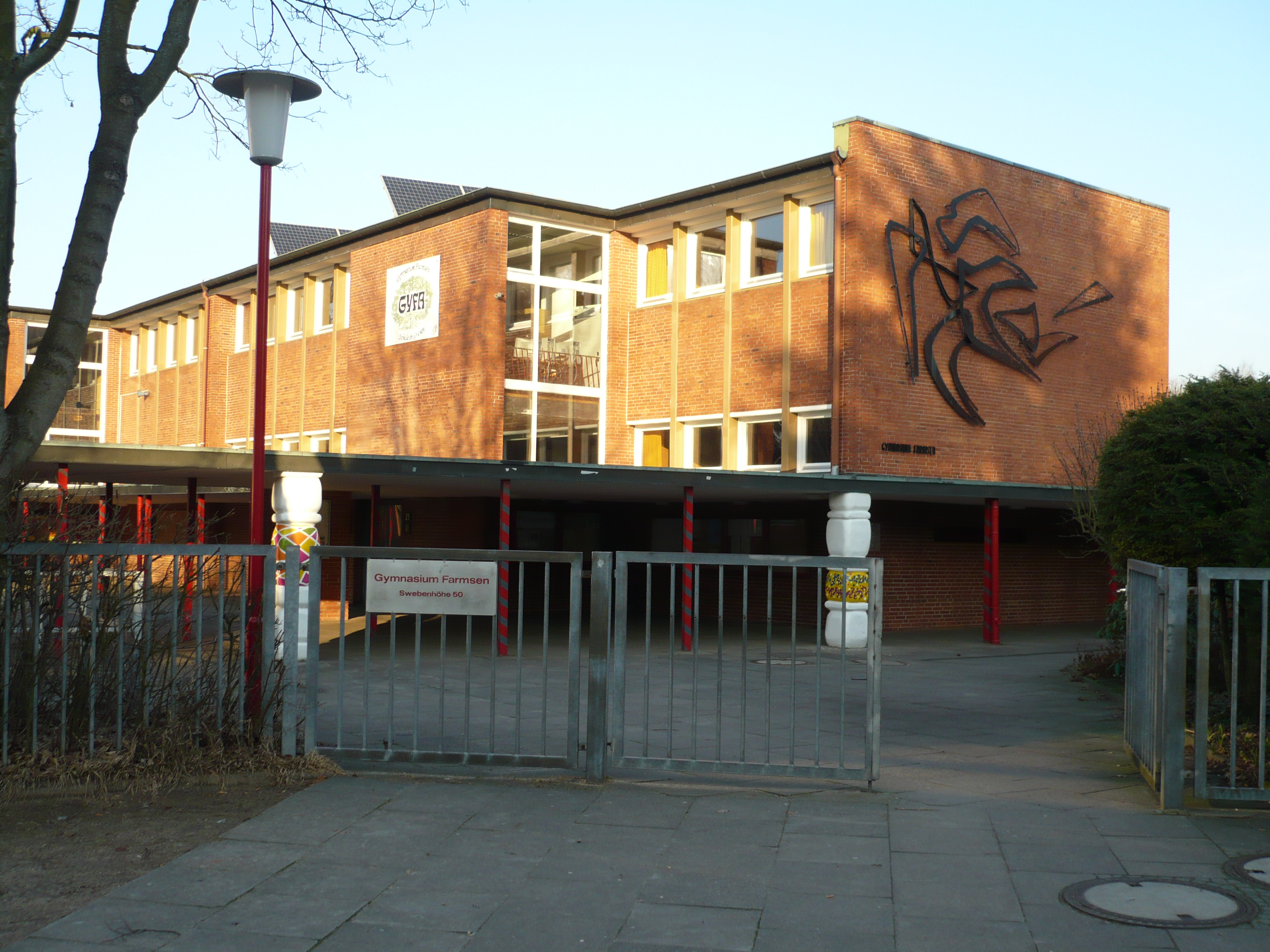
- Wandsbek, Hamburg; Germany

Information
- Type: Gymnasium
- Established: 1956
- Principal: Steffi Weisener
- Staff: ca. 60
- Grades: 5-12, Abitur
- Enrollment: ca. 890
- Website: gymnasium-farmsen.de

The Gymnasium Farmsen (GyFa) is a German high school (see "Gymnasium") in Farmsen-Berne borough of Hamburg, Germany, established in 1956. The school is a bilingual school — some subjects are taught in English. It is a partner school of Minneapolis South High School.

== Principals ==
- Walter Löding 1956–1969
- Uwe Schmidt 1969–1994
- Konny G. Neumann 1994-2011
- Peter Geest 2011-2019
- Steffi Weisener since 2019

== Awards ==
In the best school contests, which were initiated by Unicum Abi, the school achieved the following results:

- 2005: 1st place in Hamburg, 3rd place in Germany
- 2006: 1st place in Hamburg, 5th place in Germany
- 2007: 1st place in Hamburg, 8th place in Germany
- 2008: 1st place in Hamburg, 7th place in Germany

== Notable alumni ==
- Ingo Egloff, politician
- Wilfried Lemke, manager
- Vince Bahrdt, musician
- Gernot Gricksch, author
- Katja Studt, actress
- Andreas Schlueter, author
- Detlef Gottschalck, politician
- Carsten Frigge, politician
- Stephan Merseburger, journalist, television presenter
- Claus "Bubi the Schmied" Graf-Reinholdt, musician
