= Pamela Reif =

German social media influencer

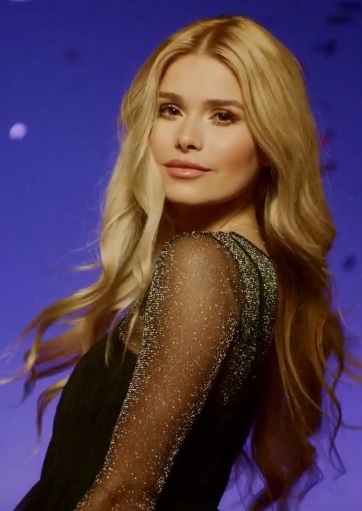
- Pamela Reif (2020)
- Born: July 9, 1996 (age 29); Karlsruhe, Germany

YouTube information
- Channel: Pamela Reif
- Years active: 2013–present
- Genres: Vlog; Podcast
- Subscribers: 10,6 million
- Views: 167.5 million
- Last updated: 15th december, 2025

Pamela Leonie Reif (born 9 July 1996 in Karlsruhe) is a German web video producer and influencer. She covers topics such as nutrition, fitness, and lifestyle. She has authored a few books on the subject and owns a food brand Naturally Pam, which sells snacks and health supplements. In 2020, she was ranked in first place on the Forbes list of "30 Under 30 DACH".

== Life and career ==
Pamela Leonie Reif was born on 9 July 1996 in Karlsruhe, Germany. In 2014, she obtained her high school diploma from the Heisenberg-Gymnasium. She has been active on Instagram since 2012, where she first published photos of landscapes and food and then of sports and fitness exercises. As of February 2025, she had around 9.1 million subscribers in Instagram. Reif makes her living by promoting fitness products and clothing fashion. On her YouTube channel, which has been running since 2013, she has more than 10.2 million subscribers (as of January 2025). In 2020, she was ranked in first place on the Forbes list of "30 Under 30 DACH".

In 2017, Reif published her first book titled Strong & Beautiful which covered topics such as nutrition, fitness and lifestyle. In May 2019, she published her second book titled You Deserve This. She has also been publishing the podcast Schaumermal since March 2020.

At the beginning of 2021, Reif founded a food brand Naturally Pam and sells various protein bars, muesli, and other snacks in partnership with Goodlife Company GmbH.

== Criticism and accusations ==
In January 2019, Reif was convicted in one of the three injunctions previously brought up against Reif by the Association of Social Competition ("Verband Sozialer Wettbewerb") at the Karlsruhe Regional Court on the accusation of surreptitious advertising. The Karlsruhe Higher Regional Court confirmed the judgment in September 2020. The judgment was put on hold as a revision petition was filed to the Federal Court of Justice (BGH) which was admitted. The Association of Social Competition later withdrew the lawsuit before the Federal Court of Justice in January 2022 after a fundamental decision of the Federal Court in September 2021 in the trial against influencers Cathy Hummels, Leonie Hanne and Luisa- Maxime Huss was decided on the labeling of advertising in favor of influencers. The association bore the costs of the legal dispute against Reif.

== Publications ==
- Strong & Beautiful. Community Editions, Cologne 2017, ISBN 978-3-96096-001-0
- You Deserve This: Simple & natural recipes for a healthy lifestyle. Bowl cookbook. Community Editions, Cologne 2019, ISBN 978-3-96096-074-4
- You Deserve This: Simple & natural recipes for a healthy lifestyle. Snack cookbook. Community Editions, Cologne 2021, ISBN 978-3-96096-189-5
