= Hamburg University of Technology =

University in Hamburg, Germany

- Technische Universität Hamburg
- Other name: TUHH
- Motto: Technik für die Menschen
- Motto in English: Technology for Humanity
- Type: Public
- Established: 1978
- Affiliations: ECIU
- Budget: EUR 156 million
- President: Prof. Dr. Andreas Timm-Giel
- Vice-president: Prof. Dr.-Ing. Kerstin Kuchta, Prof. Dr.-Ing. Irina Smirnova
- Academic staff: 802
- Total staff: 1410
- Students: 7,383
- Location: Am Schwarzenberg-Campus 1 (A), Hamburg, 21073, Germany; 53°27′23.39″N 9°58′5.99″E
- Campus: Urban
- Website: www.tuhh.de

The Hamburg University of Technology (in German Technische Universität Hamburg, abbreviated TUHH (HH as acronym of Hamburg state) or TU Hamburg) is a public research university in Germany. The university was founded in 1978 and in 1982/83 lecturing followed. Around 110 senior lecturers/professors and 1,410 members of staff (802 scientists, including externally funded researchers) work at the TUHH.

It is located in Harburg, a district in the south of Hamburg.

== Academics ==
=== Interdisciplinary Studies ===
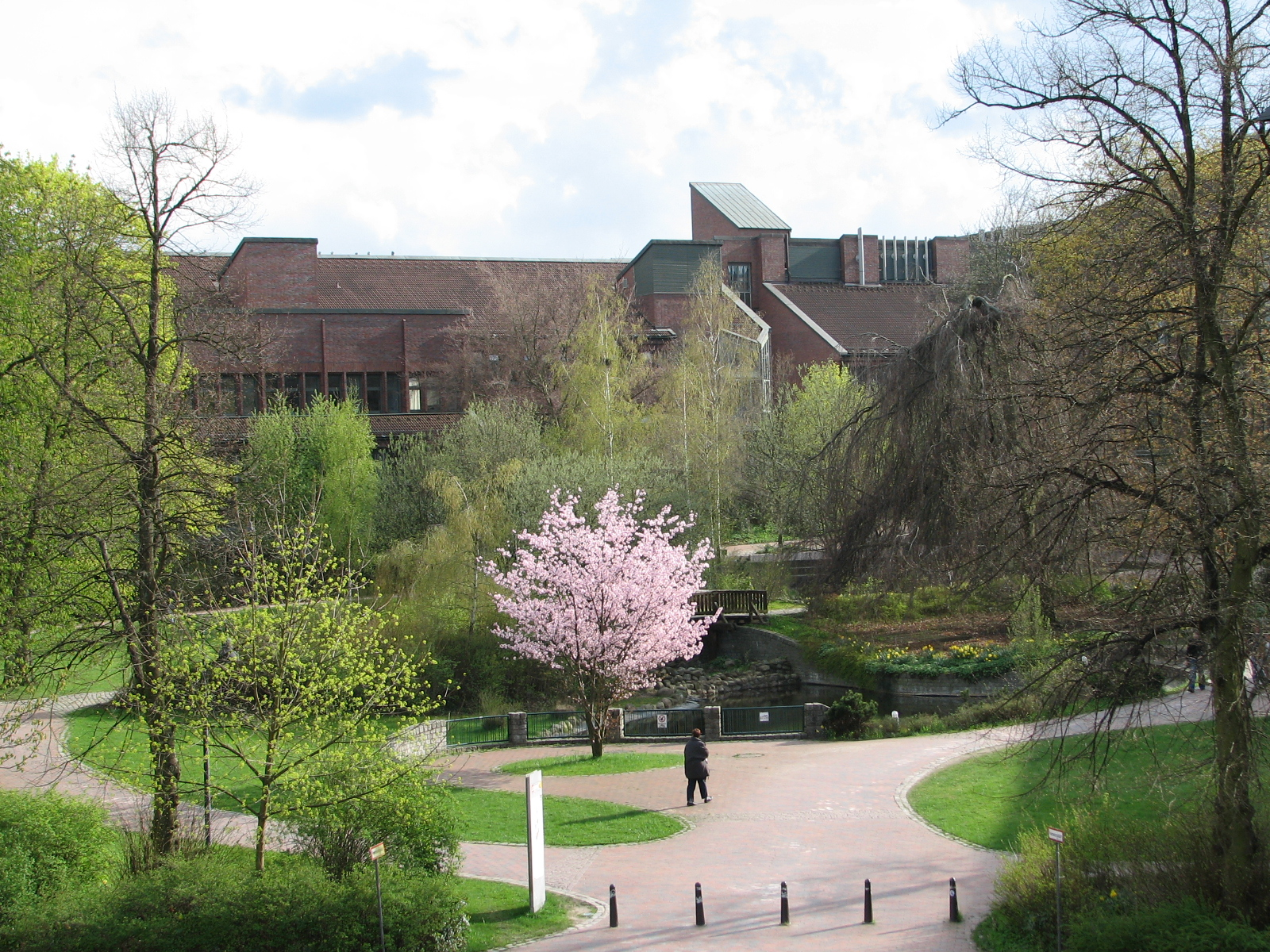
TU Hamburg Campus

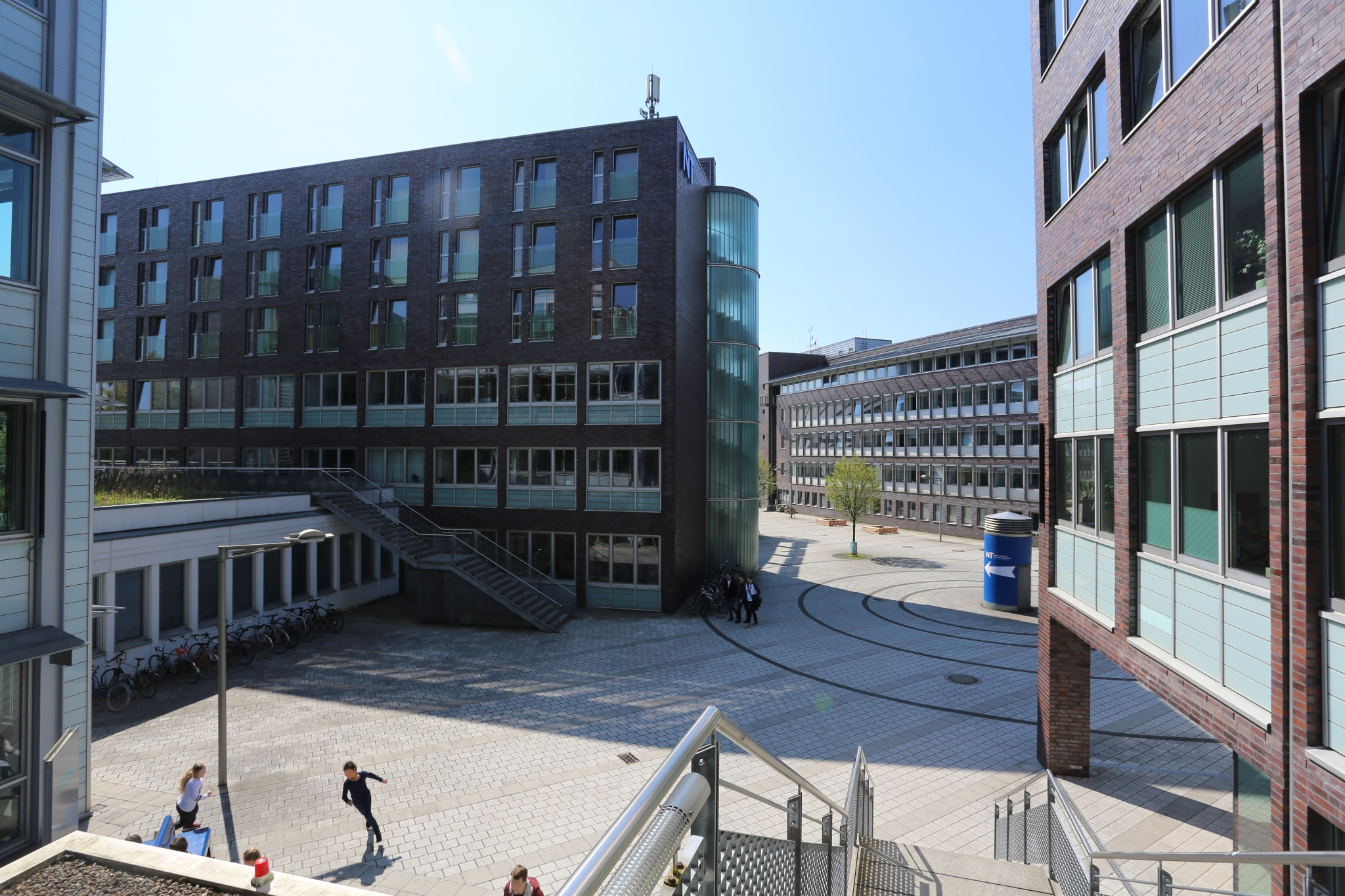
Inside view of the TUHH Campus

Instead of traditional faculties, the TUHH has separate administrations for teaching and for research: research is conducted in departments, teaching is divided into schools of study. Scientists from different subjects work together in the departments. Curricula are organized by academic speciality, depending on the course of study followed.

In the year 2000, the TUHH defined the following strategic topics of research activities:

1. Information as economic value
2. Organization for enterprises
3. Production and process integrated environmental protection
4. Sustainable management of resources
5. Advanced energy systems and energy management
6. Sustainable urban structures
7. Systems of transport and logistic
8. Advanced information and communication technologies
9. Advanced materials and microsystems
10. Biotechnologies and biomedical engineering

Research is divided into six interdisciplinary research departments:

1. Town, Environment, Technology
2. Systems Engineering
3. Civil Engineering and Marine Technology
4. Information and Communication Technology
5. Materials, Design, Manufacturing
6. Processing Technology and Energy Systems

Teaching is organized in eight schools of study:

1. Civil Engineering
2. Electrical Engineering, Computer Science and Mathematics
3. Vocational Subject Education
4. Management Science and Technology
5. Mechanical Engineering
6. Process and Chemical Engineering
7. General Engineering Sciences
8. Naval Architecture

=== Northern Institute of Technology Management ===
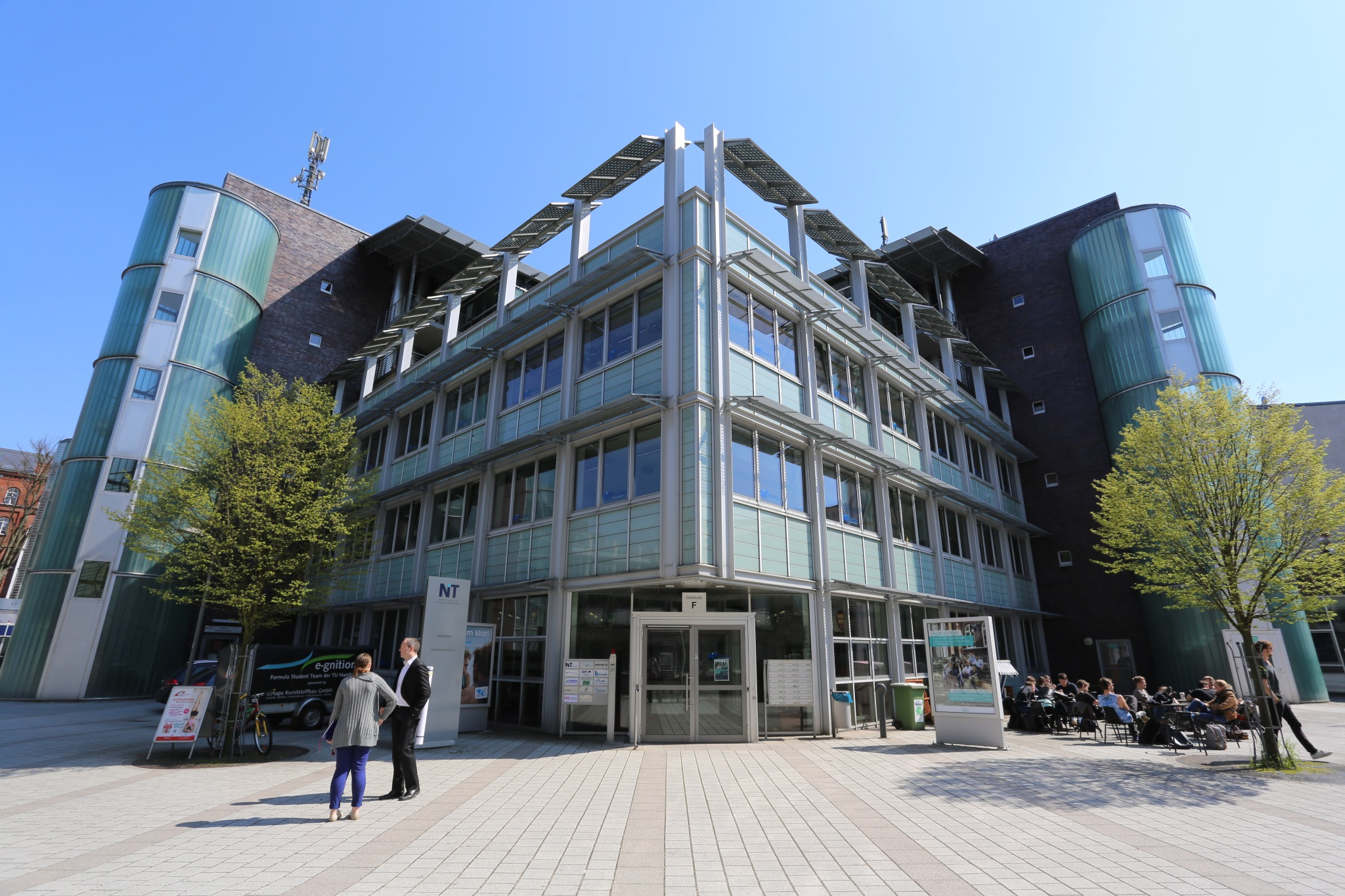
NIT

The Northern Institute of Technology (NIT) Management is a private educational institute located on the campus of the Hamburg University of Technology (TUHH) in Hamburg, Germany. It was founded in 1998 as a public-private partnership of the Hamburg University of Technology and sponsoring companies.

The NIT offers a double degree master's program in technology management in cooperation with the Hamburg University of Technology (TUHH): Students study a Master of Science in an engineering or science program at the TUHH while studying in the MBA program at the NIT—which is also offered part-time for working professionals. Students will graduate from the NIT with an MBA or Master of Technology Management degree after completion of the courses. Besides the classical management disciplines, the MBA program includes modules from areas of classical management, self-development, innovation management, company foundation, and digitalization to familiarize students with the entrepreneurial challenges of the future: All classes are held in the English language. The faculty consists of professors and industry experts from various universities and international companies. The management program offered by the NIT is accredited by the Foundation for International Business Administration Accreditation (FIBAA). After the NIT developed the content and structure of its Master's program in Technology Management in 2019, the FIBAA reaccredited the program and it may continue to bear their seal of approval.

=== Innovation ===
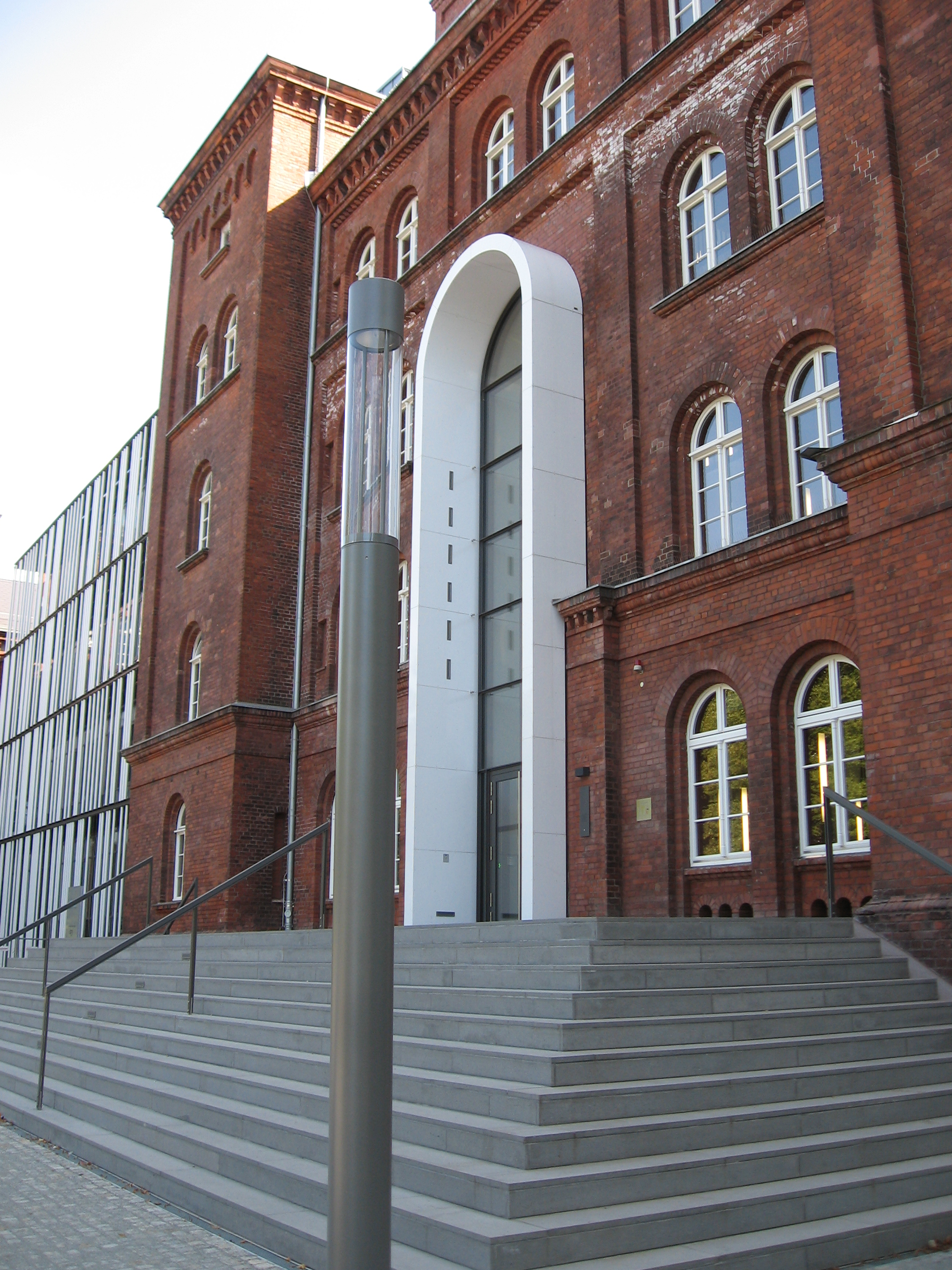
Main building of Hamburg University of Technology (TUHH)

TUHH founded the TUHH Technologie GmbH (TuTech). Since 1992 the TuTech has been responsible for technology transfer and advice, for trade fairs and further training, as well as congresses and the initiation of projects. Young entrepreneurs are accompanied and advised on setting up their own business. In 1994 the TUHH became a pioneer German university in the creation of modular courses and introduced a course with a bachelor's degree in General Engineering Science. Since 1997 nine master's degree courses and a bachelor's degree course have been added.

=== Rankings ===
University rankings

Overall – Global & National
THE World 2024	501–600	42–45

According to the Times Higher Education World University Rankings for 2024, the institution is situated between 501 and 600 globally, and in the 42–45 range nationally.

In 2020, the university ranked 92nd in the Times Higher Education Young University Rankings.

== Campus ==
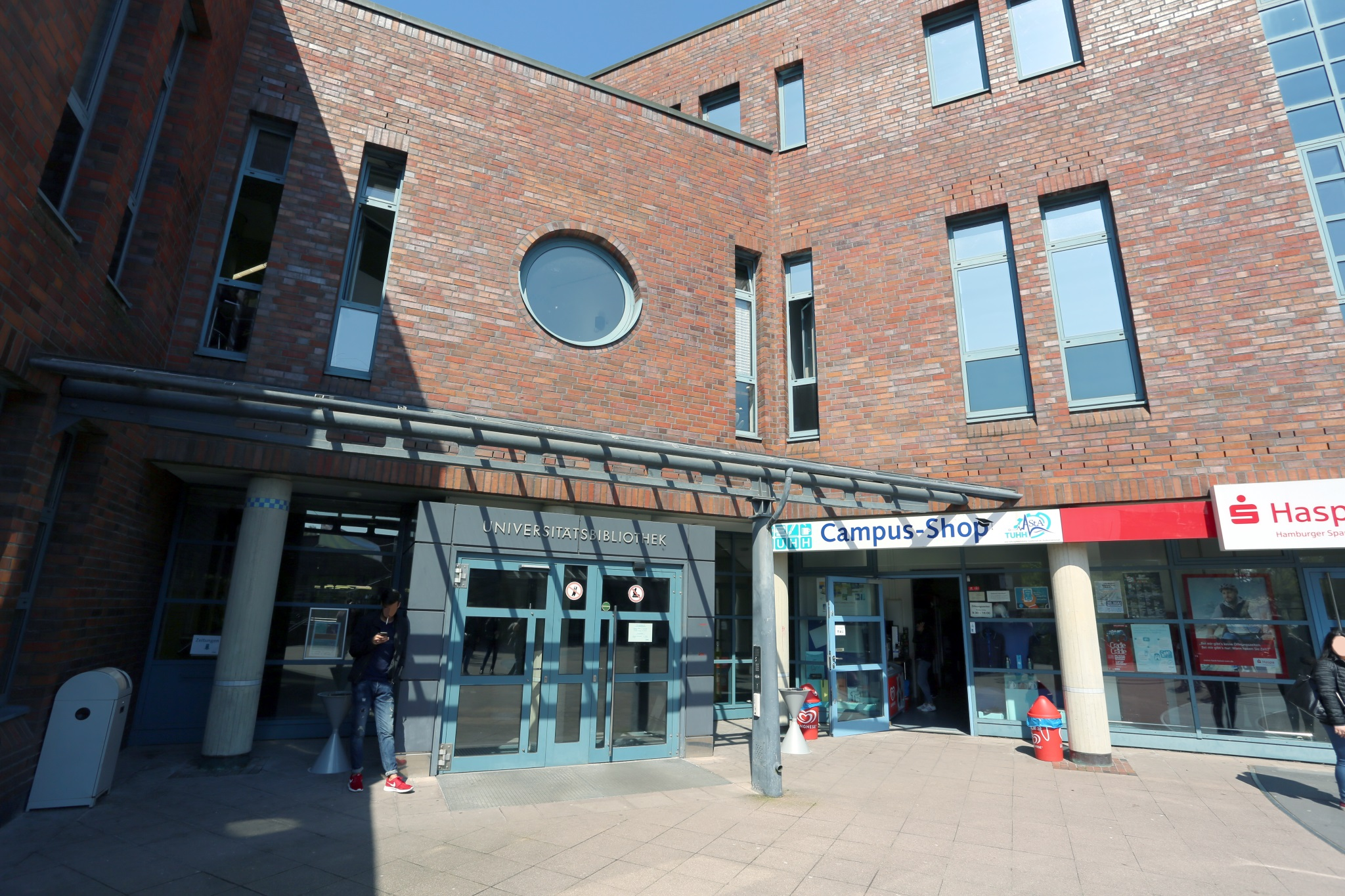
TUB

Hamburg University of Technology is for the most part contained in a single campus. The buildings of which are almost all between the streets Eißendorfer Straße and "Am Schwarzenberg-Campus". However, there are some exceptions to this, including space in the Technologiezentrum Hamburg-Finkenwerder (Hamburg-Finkenwerder Center of Technology) and the Hamburg Innovation Port.

The street, Denickestraße, divides the main campus into a northern and southern half. The southern half is centered around a series of small ponds and trees, while the northern half contains a more spacious paved courtyard.

=== University Library ===
The library is not only used internally but as a specialized technical library of the Hamburg region. Its services are also available to citizens who are not students.

In addition to the basic service of providing printed media on loan or for use within the TUB HH, the library also procures documents from cooperation partners such as libraries, specialized information centres and publishers.
