= Fashion influencer =

Person who influences fashion through social media

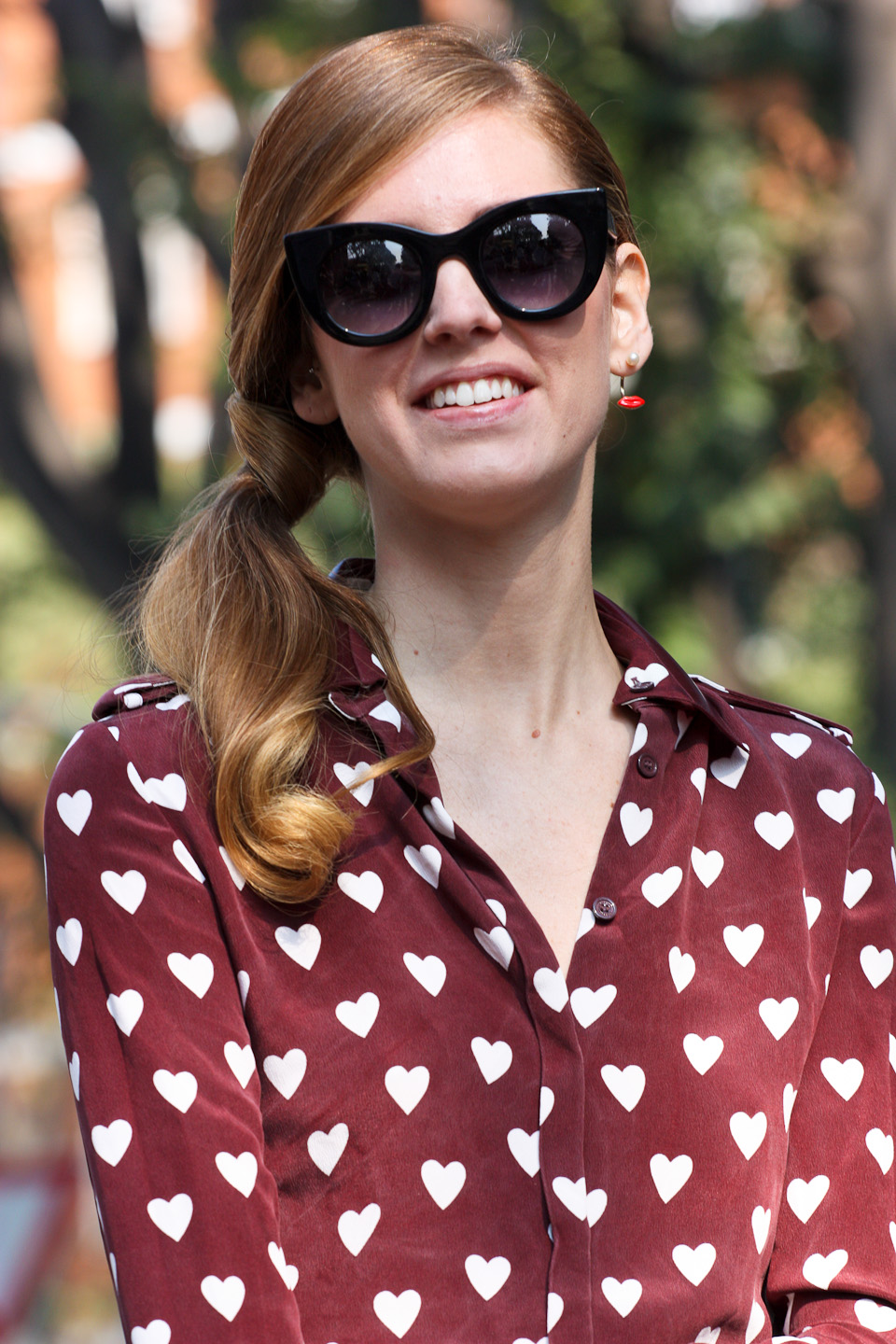
Italian blogger Chiara Ferragni was named Top Fashion Influencer by American magazine Forbes in 2017

A fashion influencer is a personality that has a large number of followers on social media, creates mainly fashion content and has the power to influence the opinion and purchase behavior of others with their recommendations. Brands endorse them to attend fashion shows, parties, designer dinners, and exclusive trips, and to wear their clothes on social media. If a salary has been involved, the influencer may be required to label such posts as paid or sponsored content. Before social media "they would have been called 'It girls'".

Business magazine Forbes identified fashion influencers as "the new celebrity endorsements". However, influencers seem to have a closer relationship with their audience than traditional celebrities. As marketers Jung von Matt, Brandnew IO and Facelift point out: "Daily interactions across multiple channels, through photos, stories or live sessions, create a form of closeness and trust" that make influencers "often more tangible than traditional celebrities".

== History ==
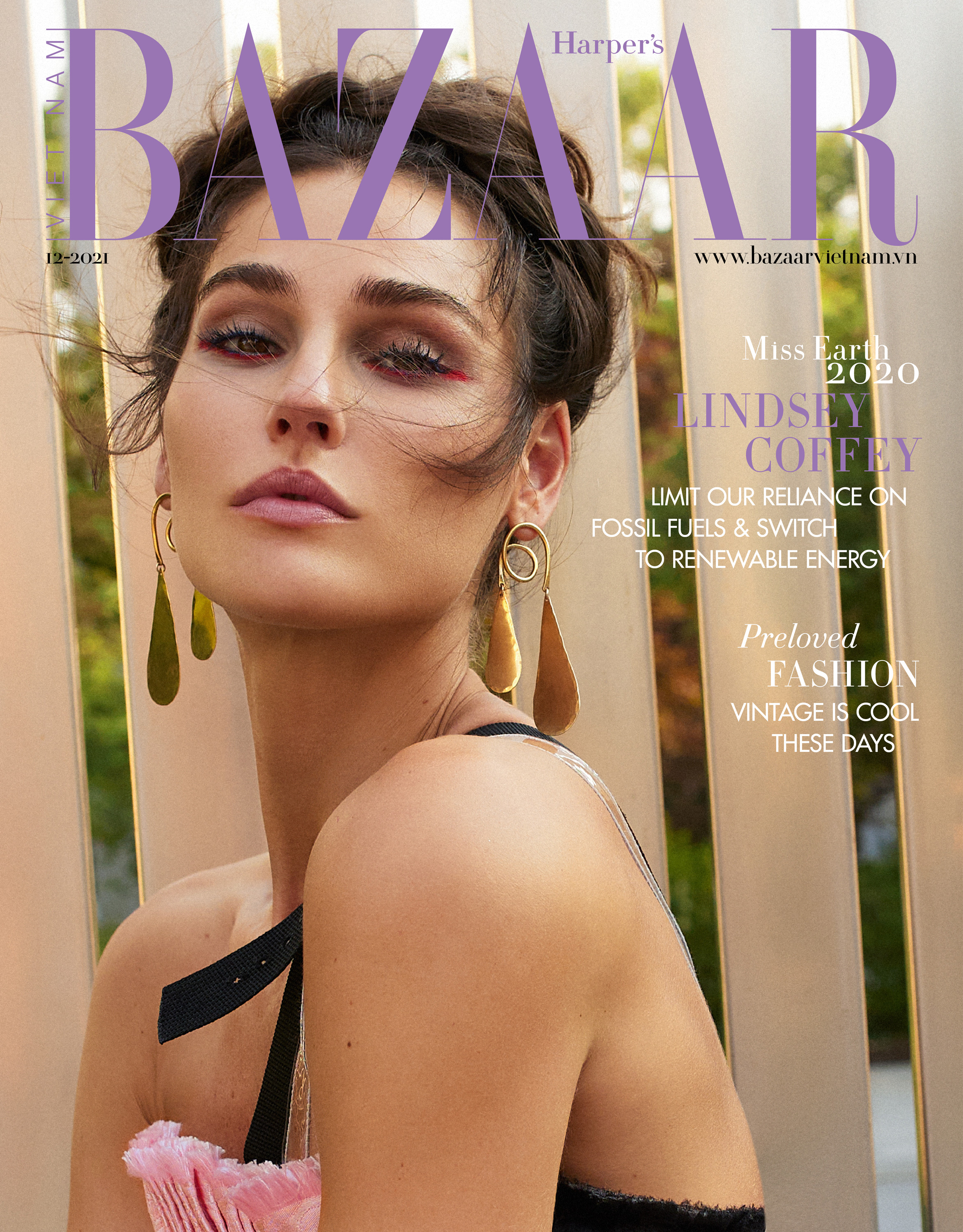
American model and Miss Earth 2020 Lindsey Coffey on the Cover of Harper's Bazaar magazine Vietnam December 2021 as she encouraged fashion influencers to become advocates for the environment

At the beginning of 2000, online fashion blogs appeared to be amateurish personal areas created as a hobby by fashion lovers to share their ideas of the latest trends or to get a job in the traditional fashion industry later on. At the time, the fashion industry was notoriously top-down and elitist. Fashion brands exercised tight control over the marketing of their products. Fashion blog amateurs became formidable rivals to fashion journalism by offering critique and spotting trends. Eventually, fashion blog amateurs were invited to sit next to celebrity fashion editors on fashion show front row seats.

With increasing reach, fashion bloggers learned to monetize their content. As Pedroni remarks: “fashion blogs evolved from personal diaries kept by fashion lovers, into sophisticated marketing and economic tools”. Shortly after, new social media platforms such as Instagram, Twitter, TikTok, Facebook and YouTube spread. They enabled bloggers to reach a greater audience and have an even closer relationship with their existing readership. In fact, some bloggers closed their blogs as traffic moved to other platforms such as Instagram. According to researcher Emily Hund “Social media’s influencer economy has gained steam quickly in the last few years, particularly on platforms like Instagram and Pinterest, whose image-heavy nature easily lends itself to commerce”. Social media also gave rise to influencers who did not have a blog in the first place. Jenn Im became a fashion influencer due to her successful YouTube channel, German influencer Pamela Reif due to her high reach on Instagram.

In 2017, Instagram was the social media platform with the highest reach for fashion influencers. Forbes calculated that the top ten fashion influencers combined generated a reach of 23.3 million on Instagram. It named Chiara Ferragni, Danielle Bernstein, Julia Engel, Gabi Gregg, Jenn Im, Susanna Lau, Nicolette Mason, Simone Zippi Stardust, Aimee Song, and Bryanboy as the top influencers in the fashion category.

At the same time, the fashion industry had the highest share on Instagram influencer marketing in the US. Its share, approximately 61%, far outweighed other sectors investing in influencer marketing such as travel (8%), and food and drinks (7%). The fashion industry spends around €1 billion on sponsored Instagram posts each year.

By 2019, many fashion influencers had "closet accounts" dedicated to them on social media. Often influential in their own right, these accounts search clothing websites to identify the clothes the influencers wear and post the resulting shopping list. In doing so, they amplify the marketing power of the influencers and help shape business trends.

== Business ==
Fashion influencers generate income through brand co-operations and affiliate links. Principal sources of income are brand co-operations in terms of product placement. Fashion influencers are paid to pose with specific products on their social media channels and must mark them correspondingly.

The economic value of a fashion influencer is most commonly measured by the number of followers. Other key aspects are demographics of their followers, engagement rate and fit between influencer and brand. The latter is the necessary precondition for influencers to work with a brand. As thousands of people follow them for their authentic personalities and style, influencers must be able to identify themselves with the brand in order to recommend it convincingly. Many influencers claim to work exclusively with brands they really like and would recommend in private as well. Influencer Camille Charrière reportedly turned down a 5-digit offer of Macy’s, because she could not identify with the clothes: “At the end of the day, I’m selling my taste and my eye – if I do things off-brand I will lose the respect”.

=== For fashion influencers ===
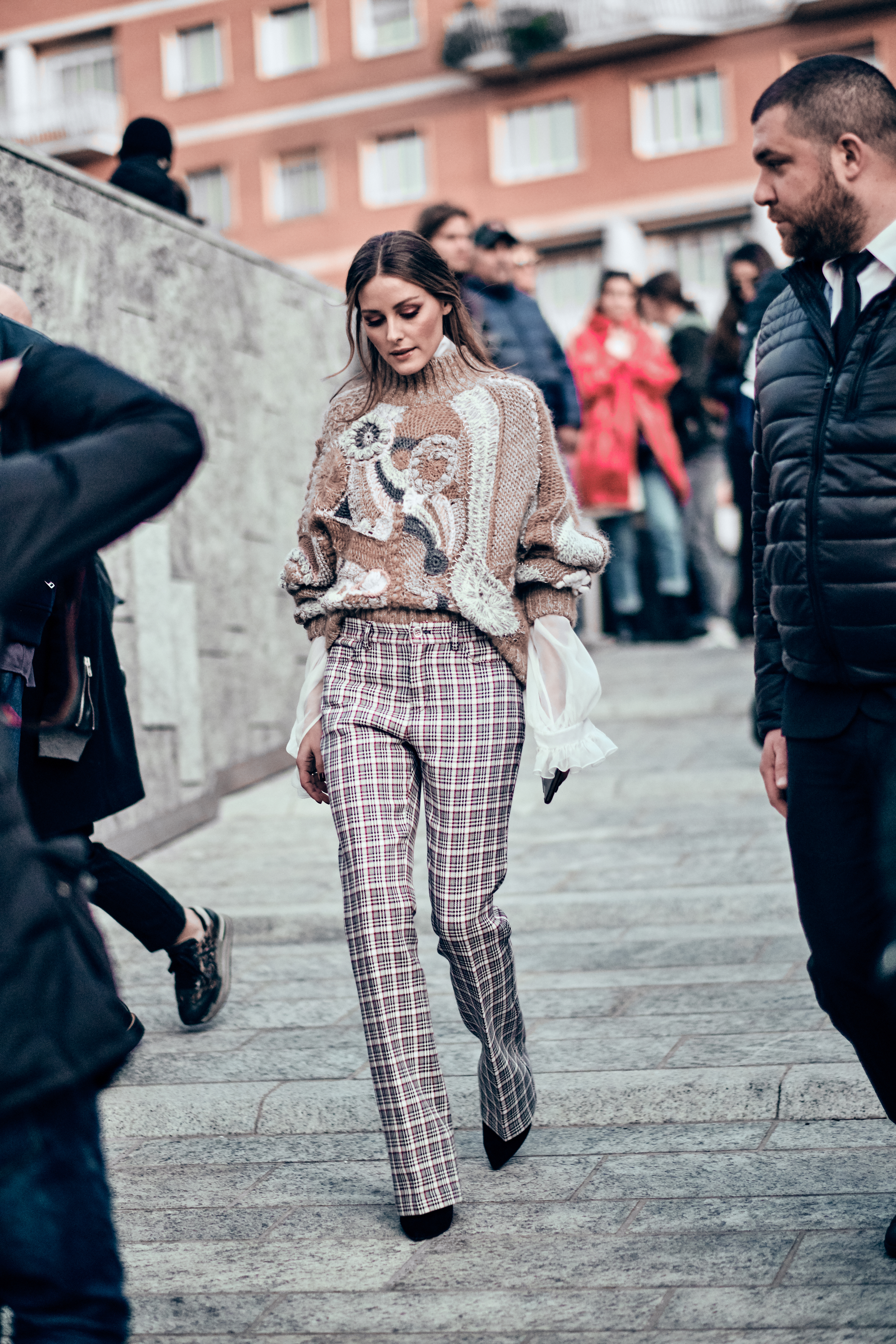
Fashion influencer and entrepreneur Olivia Palermo at the 2019 Milan Fashion Week

Successful fashion influencers generate an income through their social media activities that enables them to quit their jobs and focus solely on their social media career. German fashion influencer Xenia van der Woodsen (xeniaoverdose) left her full-time job at an investment trust when she realized that she could earn more money with a single Instagram post than working mana full day in a regular job. Robert and Christina are US-based Instagram fashion influencers and bloggers with over 450K followers on Instagram. They feature content on fashion, decor, travel, and their life together, and have you covered for all kinds of style inspiration – her style, his style, and couple style.

Until fashion influencer Danielle Bernstein spoke out on her mid-six figures income in 2015, financial information about the influencer business were relatively rare and inconsistent. In 2017, a study of Jung von Matt, Brandnew IO and Facelift revealed that such a high income is relatively rare among influencers. Only eight out of the 1,200 interviewed influencers earn on average, between $10,000 – 25,000 per campaign and only three of them earn more than $25,000. Albeit the “leading fashion influencers in Germany make over one million in revenue each year”, the majority makes less than $1,000 per campaign.

A majority of influencers receive a salary. Solely a minority of 20 percent makes brand co-operations in exchange for giveaways. The salary primarily depends on the number of followers. The higher the follower number, the higher the salary range. The price for a cooperation depends also on the contract terms, for example if it concerns a one-time Instagram post or a long-term partnership including several posts. Xenia van der Woodsen, one of Germany’s top three fashion influencers in 2017, accepts only long-term brand co-operations in the majority of cases. In her experience, posts of long-term campaigns appear more authentic and credible, whereas single paid content pieces stand out as advertisements.

==== Affiliate links ====
Affiliate links enable fashion influencers to earn money on commission. The procedure was introduced by Amber Venz Box in 2011 and then updated in 2014.

=== For fashion brands ===
Fashion brands use the reach and positive reputation of influencers by implementing influencer marketing. Influencers spread brand messages, increase brand awareness, contribute to a positive brand image and increase sales by tagging fashion brands in their posts.

Although data that shows the direct correlation between influencer campaigns and sales are rare, the success of affiliate platforms as rewardStyle, Chirpyest, Shopstyle Collective and successful examples such as the #mangogirls campaign indicate that influencer engagement affects sales. In the #mangogirls campaign, several influencers had independently chosen the same coat as their favorite piece of the Mango collection and showcased it on Instagram. The coat went viral and sold out. In fact, the first studies show that every third consumer has already bought a product following the recommendation of an influencer.

== Criticism ==
Fashion influencers have been criticized by journalists for their lack of transparency on sponsored posts. The lines between posts in which influencers share product recommendations for free or because they are paid for it are often blurred. Influencers are supposed to mark a sponsored post with hashtags such as #ad or #sponsored, but often use less-obvious hashtags like #sp or none at all.

Due to this lack of transparency, the U.S. Federal Trade Commission (FTC) sent out dozens of warning letters to Instagram influencers at the beginning of 2017, giving further indications to influencers and marketers on how to disclose advertising and sponsored posts. Following the rules of the FTC, hashtags like #ad have to appear before the "more" button and are not allowed to be buried in a flood of other hashtags. Thus, "anyone endorsing a brand must "clearly and conspicuously" declare connections to it, for example, if products have been given free, if a payment has been made for the endorsement or if there is a business or family relationship".

In June 2017, Instagram launched a new disclosure system with which users can tag sponsors in a post. If the brand confirms the commercial relation, the post is marked with a "paid partnership" tag at the top.

== See also ==
- Affiliate marketing
- Beauty YouTuber
- Celebrity branding
- Instagram models
