= Karl Rathgen =

German economist

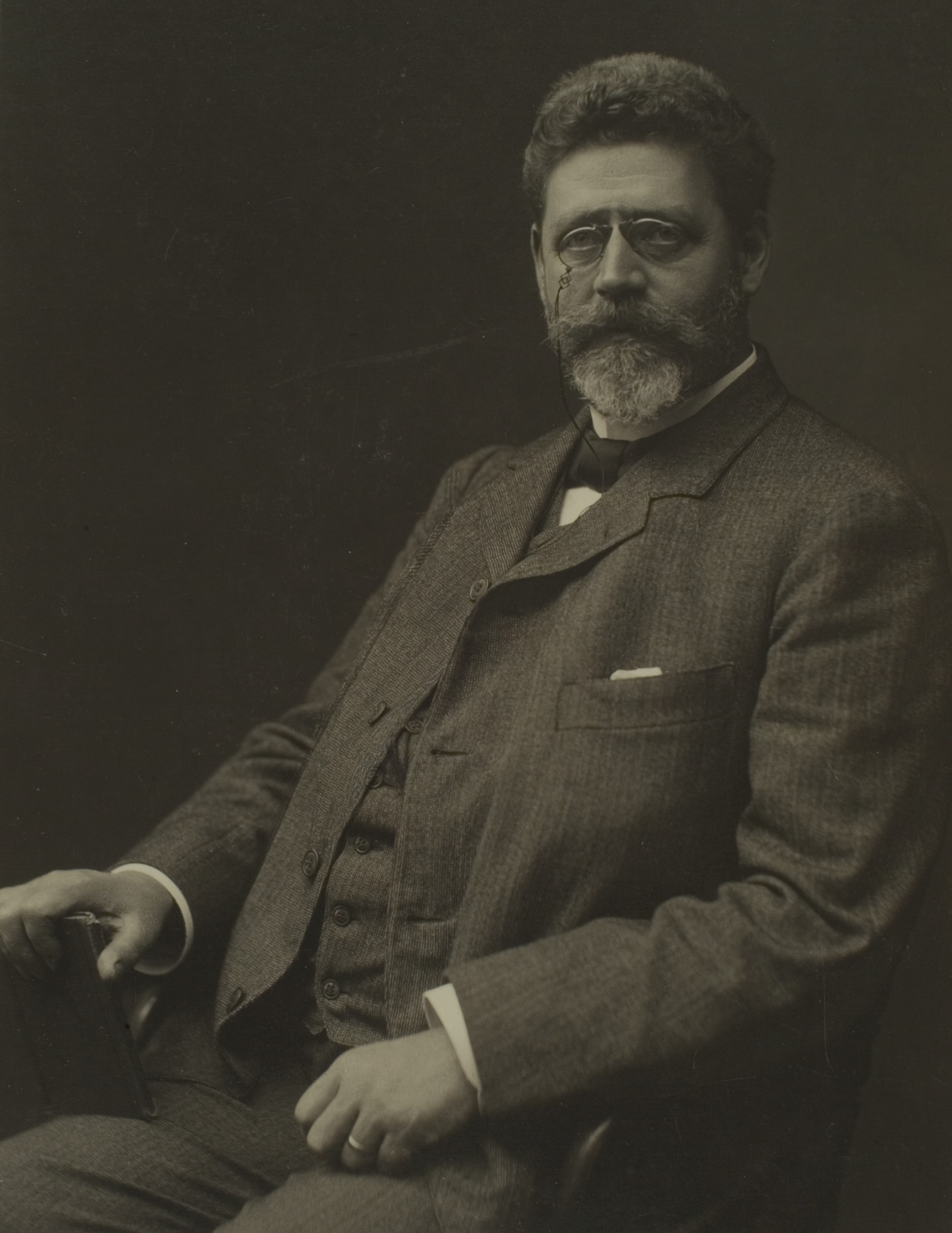
'Karl Rathgen

Karl Rathgen (December 6, 1856, in Weimar – November 4, 1921, in Hamburg) was a German economist. He was the first Chancellor of the University of Hamburg.

After studying in Strasbourg, Halle, Leipzig and Berlin, he passed the first state examination in Naumburg in 1880 in Naumburg and earned his doctorate (Dr. rer. pol.) in 1882 with a thesis on the Making of markets in Germany from the University of Straßburg.

From 1882 to 1890, he taught Public Law, Statistics and Administration Science at the Imperial University of Tokyo and was also an adviser to the Japanese Ministry of Agriculture and Commerce.

In 1892, Rathgen passed his habilitation at the Friedrich Wilhelms University of Berlin and the following years was appointed extraordinary, in 1895 ordinary Professor of the University of Marburg. From 1900 to 1903, he was temporarily in charge of Max Webers Chair at University of Heidelberg. In 1907, he received funding from the Hamburg Scientific Foundation becomiung a Professor at the newly established Hamburg Colonial Institute the following year. After its transformation into the University of Hamburg in 1919, he took over the chair of Economics, Colonial policy and Public finance and became at the same time its first Chancellor.

From 1913 to 1914, Rathgen taught as an Exchange Professor at Columbia University in New York.

He mostly came out with publications on Japan and had a great impact on German perception of the economic development of Japan.

== Works ==
Among others:

- Japans Volkswirtschaft und Staatshaushalt (Japan's Economy and state budget). Leipzig: Duncker & Humblot 1891
- Die Japaner und ihre wirtschaftliche Entwicklung (The Japanese and their economic development). Leipzig: Teubner 1905.
- Staat und Kultur der Japaner (State and Culture of the Japanese). Bielefeld, Leipzig: Velhagen & Klasing 1907.
- Die Japaner in der Weltwirtschaft (The Japanese in the World Economy). Leipzig: Teubner 1911.
