= Anke Grotlüschen =

- Born: 1969 (age 56–57)
- Occupations: Educational researcher and professor

Anke Grotlüschen (born 1969) is an educational researcher and professor at the University of Hamburg.

== Life ==
Anke Grotlüschen studied at the Wirtschaftsakademie Hamburg from 1988 – 1991 and finished as Betriebswirtin (Business Administration). She continued studying educational sciences from 1991 – 1997 with the main topics being Adult Education as well as psychology, sociology and politics as minors at the University of Hamburg. She finished this study program with a thesis about political education in the perspective of critical psychology.

From 1998 – 2000 she worked as a coordinator in ESF-Programmes at the Berufsbildungswerk DGB GmbH (bfw) in Lübeck, until she became a research assistant at the University of Hamburg at the department of Education with the foci Adult Education and leisure research. She wrote her PhD in 2003 about learning resistance in E-Learning "Virtuell und selbstbestimmt? Widerständiges Lernen im Web" with Peter Faulstich as dissertation advisor. She took over different positions in the area of media education before becoming junior professor for Lifelong Learning at the institute for Adult Education research, Faculty of Education at the University of Bremen in 2005. Her project "Knochen kommt zum Hund", which enabled parents of students to understand PISA and PIACC from a research perspective, was distinguished by the "Stifter Verband" in 2006. Her habilitation was about the development of interest. In 2008 Anke Grotlüschen became Professor for Adult Education in Cultural and Social Contexts, before changing the position within the Institute for Education at the University of Hamburg, to become a professor for Lifelong Learning.

The research foci of Anke Grotlüschen are educational interests, addressee research and interest research, literacy, learning resistance and E-Learning. In the area of higher education she focuses especially on public science and didactic as well as research of higher education. In the area of educational system monitoring, she is especially interested in the topics globalisation and law as well as political and cultural education. With the "leo. – Level-One Study" from 2009 to 2013 Anke Grotlüschen was responsible for the first comprehensive study of literacy in Germany. Building on this, the current "Leo-Grundbildungsstudie" is conceptualised.

In March 2017 Anke Grotlüschen organised a conference in honour of Peter Faulstich together with Silke Schreiber-Barsch, Christine Zeuner and Sabine Schmidt-Lauff as well as Hannelore Faulstich-Wieland about the political aspects in Adult Education, one of the main foci of the work of Peter Faulstich.

Anke Grotlüschen is married and lives in Hamburg.

== Current research projects ==
- "Leo-Grundbildungsstudie" (2017 – 2020), funded by Bundesministerium für Bildung und Forschung
- "Numeracy Practices & Lifelong Learning. Feldstudien zu alltagsmathematischen Praktiken, ihrem Erwerb und Verlust im Erwachsenenleben." (2017 – 2020), funded by Landesforschungsförderung Hamburg
- "Reading Components und niedrige Kompetenzniveaus – ein besseres Verständnis von Personen mit niedrigen Kompetenzen." (2014 – 2017), funded by Bundesministerium für Bildung und Forschung

== Membership in committees and associations ==
- Botschafterin für Alphabetisierung und Grundbildung 2015 des Bundesverbandes Alphabetisierung und Grundbildung e.V.
- Mitglied im wissenschaftlichen Beirat der Dekade für Alphabetisierung und Grundbildung berufen von Bildungsministerin Johanna Wanka
- Mitglied im wissenschaftlichen Beirat des Projekts MENTO – Ausbildung und Implementierung von Lernberaterinnen und Lernmentorinnen und Sensibilisierung arbeitsweltlicher Akteure für Grundbildung und Alphabetisierung in der Arbeitswelt"
- Mitglied im wissenschaftlichen Beirat des Deutschen Volkshochschulverbands
- Mitglied im wissenschaftlichen Beirat des Projektes REACH der Stiftung Lesen
- Mitglied in der Deutschen Gesellschaft für Erziehungswissenschaften
- Mitglied im Bundesverband der Erziehungswissenschaftlerinnen und Erziehungs-wissenschaftler
- Mitglied in der null European Educational Research Association
- Mitglied in der European Society for Research on the Education of Adults.

== Selected publications ==
- Grotlüschen, A. et al. (2016): Adults with Low Proficiency in Literacy or Numeracy. OECD Education Working Papers, No. 131, OECD Publishing, Paris.
- Grotlüschen, A. (2016): Politische Grundbildung – Theoretische und empirische Annäherungen, Zeitschrift für Weiterbildungsforschung – Report, 39 (2), S. 183–203.
- Grotlüschen, A. (2016): Literacy level I and below versus literacy level IV and above, Zeitschrift für Weiterbildungsforschung – Report, 39 (2), S. 255–270.
- Grotlüschen, A.; Haberzeth, E. (2016): Rechtliche Grundlagen der Weiterbildung. In: Tippelt, R.; von Hippel, A. (Hrsg.): Handbuch Erwachsenenbildung/Weiterbildung. 6. Aufl., Wiesbaden: VS-Verlag.
- Riekmann, W.; Buddeberg, K.; Grotlüschen, A. (2016): Das mitwissende Umfeld von Erwachsenen mit geringen Lese- und Schreibkompetenzen. Ergebnisse aus der Umfeldstudie. Münster: Waxmann.
- Grotlüschen, A. (2016): Zur Größenordnung des funktionalen Analphabetismus in Deutschland. Münster
- Grotlüschen, A.; Zimper, D. (2015): Literalitäts- und Grundlagenforschung. Münster, Waxmann.
- Grotlüschen, A.; Riekmann, W. (2012): Funktionaler Analphabetismus in Deutschland. Ergebnisse der ersten leo. – Level-One Studie. Münster: Waxmann.
- Möller, S.; Zeuner, C.; Grotlüschen, A. (2011): Die Bildung der Erwachsenen. Perspektiven und Utopien. Für Peter Faulstich zum 65. Geburtstag. Weinheim: Juventa Verl.
- Grotlüschen, A. (2010): Erneuerung der Interessetheorie. Die Genese von Interesse an Erwachsenen- und Weiterbildung. Wiesbaden: VS Verl. für Sozialwissenschaften.
- Grotlüschen A., Bonna, F. (2008): German-language Literature Review, Teaching, Learning and Assessment for Adults: Improving Foundation Skills. OECD Publishing, Paris.
- Grotlüschen, A. (2003): Widerständiges Lernen im Web - virtuell selbstbestimmt? Eine qualitative Studie über E-Learning in der beruflichen Erwachsenenbildung. Münster: Waxmann.
