= Emma Mbua =

Kenyan paleoanthropologist and curator

- Born: Emma Nguvi Mbua; 1961 (age 64–65)
- Citizenship: Kenya
- Education: University of Liverpool; University of Hamburg
- Occupations: Paleoanthropologist, curator
- Known for: First East African woman to work as a paleoanthropologist
- Scientific career
- Fields: Paleoanthropology, human evolution
- Institutions: National Museums of Kenya

Emma Mbua (born 1961) is a Kenyan paleoanthropologist and a curator, who is the first East African woman to work as a paleoanthropologist.

== Career ==
Mbua was born in 1961. Her career began in 1979 when she began work at the National Museums of Kenya. She applied for a role there after finishing her A-Levels at Lugulu High School. While at the National Museum of Kenya, Emma was stationed at palaeontology laboratory for two years before she was moved to the human origins section.

In 1985, she began an MPhil qualification at the University of Liverpool in 1993. She completed her doctorate at the University of Hamburg with Günter Bräuer in 2001, in which she studied the transition of homo erectus to modern humans. She is the first woman from East Africa to have a career as a paleoanthropologist.

Mbua has worked at a number of different sites during her career including at Turkana and Sibiloi National Park. She is principal investigator on the Kantis Fossil Site, which she was awarded grants from the Leakey Foundation and the Wenner-Gren Foundation, as well as the National Geographic Society, (2018) and Paleontological Scientific Trust (PAST) in 2011, to run excavations at. There Mbua and her team excavated a carnivore hotspot as well a canine tooth and a forearm bone from an adult Australopithecus afarensis as well as two juvenile teeth of the same species. This discovery was the furthest east of the Rift Valley that remains of Austrolopithecus afarensis had been found. In 2002 she became the Head of and Principal Research Scientist in the Department of Earth Sciences at National Museums Kenya. In 2005 she co-founded the East African Association of Palaeoanthropology and Palaeontology (EAAPP), to strengthen prehistoric research in the region and unite scholars. As a lecturer at the University of Nairobi she has many students; she also spent a year as a Senior Lecturer at Mount Kenya University in 2015.

In her role at National Museums of Kenya, she gave author Bill Bryson a behind-the-scenes tour of the collections, which featured in his book African Diary.

== Selected publications ==
- Mbua, Emma, Soichiro Kusaka, Yutaka Kunimatsu, Denis Geraads, et al. 2016. Kantis: New Australopithecus Site on the Shoulders of the Rift Valley near Nairobi, Kenya. Journal of Human Evolution 94:28-44.
- Thure E. Cerling, Fredrick Kyalo Manthi, Emma N. Mbua, Louise N. Leakey, Meave G. Leakey, Richard E. Leakey, Francis H. Brown, Frederick E. Grine, John A. Hart, Prince Kaleme, Hélène Roche, Kevin T. Uno, Bernard A. Wood. Diet of Turkana Basin hominins. Proceedings of the National Academy of Sciences Jun 2013, 110 (26) 10501–10506.
- Bräuer, Günter, Mbua, Emma. Homo erectus features used in cladistics and their variability in Asian and African hominids. Journal of Human Evolution 1992, 22 (2) 79–108.
