= Hamburg University Archive =

University of Hamburg Archives
- Interactive map of University of Hamburg Archives
- 53°33′50″N 9°59′42″E
- Location: Mittelweg 177; 20148 Hamburg
- Type: Institutional repository
- Established: 2014
- Affiliation: University of Hamburg
- Director: Dennis Hormuth
- Website: archiv.uni-hamburg.de

The University of Hamburg Archives is a central institution of the University of Hamburg. As a public archives, it serves research and teaching at the university, its administration, and the wider public interest in transparency. A special feature of the University of Hamburg Archives is its responsibility for university records management, which binds it very closely to the university administration.

== History ==
The University Archives contains the archivally valuable administrative records of the University of Hamburg, its predecessor institutions, and institutions that were later amalgamated with it. In addition, the University Archives collects selected papers of university members including professors, and objects relating to university history. The records of the University Archives date back to the early twentieth century. They document (inter alia) the University of Hamburg’s emergence during the Weimar Republic, the Nazi government’s rebranding of it as the ‘Hansische Universität,’ its reopening under the British occupation as the University of Hamburg in 1945, and its development from the student protests in the late sixties and seventies to a modern twenty-first century university. From the founding of the university until 2014 the archival holdings were preserved in the Staatsarchiv Hamburg, and the older records are still predominantly held there. Any enquirer may view archival materials for academic, personal, and journalistic purposes (subject to file and data protection restriction periods).

== Structure ==
Thematically the University Archives is divided into archival and records management sections, and contains three departments for Records Management, Archival Core Functions, and Digital Services and Internal Consultancy (responsible for long-term digital archiving). The University of Hamburg Archives is thus one of the few institutions in Germany to unite all the activities involved in the entire records lifecycle, beginning with the establishment of the file plan and the assignment of filing codes to administrative activities, through to appraisal, processing, and storage of the archivally valuable parts of the university’s documentary output. The ongoing digital transformation has been accommodated by the founding of the Digital Services and Internal Consultancy department.

Dr. Dennis Hormuth is the Director of the University Archives (since 2020).

== Accessioning Emphases ==
The University Archives is firmly committed to the UNESCO Universal Declaration on Archives. As part of the public administration, it participates in the democratic process. By preserving and providing access to administrative records, it makes the University of Hamburg’s actions transparent and intelligible. The University Archives chooses, from amongst the records produced on a daily basis by the university, those that are archivally valuable and in a suitable condition for long-term preservation.

The essential foundations of appraisal and accessioning are the Hamburg Archives Law and the regulations of the University Archives (contained in the Ordnung). Further guidance for appraisal and accessioning is provided by standards (such as the documentation profile for tertiary academic institutions) produced by the archival community as well as the historical and subject expertise of the archivists who are employed by the University of Hamburg Archives. The Archives publishes detailed appraisal models on its website.

Universities are places in which future educators, political, economic, and cultural elites are trained. Knowledge about the educational contexts of these future democratic decisionmakers, artists, and knowledge disseminators is the foundation of later research. The Hamburg University Archives therefore takes an active part in the documentation of teaching and studying conditions, as well as student organisations, forms of student protest, and campus life.

Universities are engines of human progress, and the research processes that take place in them are culturally significant. The University Archives documents research processes and conditions with an emphasis on the selection and acquisition of research material that exemplifies important changes in academic knowledge and represents new research directions or methods. A further focus is on the accessioning of papers belonging to University of Hamburg academics.

Universities are part of the wider society, and the University Archives actively documents social debates providing that these were either significantly shaped by the University or by its members (whether alone or in groups). This documentation includes discourse in the print media, social media representations, television and radio.

== The Hamburg Student Enrollment Portal ==
The Hamburg Student Enrollment Portal (Matrikelportal) enables research in the student enrollment records of the University of Hamburg, providing information on all the students who studied there between 1919 and 1935. The database was published online to mark the University of Hamburg’s one hundredth anniversary. In addition to approximately 35,000 entries of enrollment data, the portal also contains the digitized original enrollment registers. These volumes contain handwritten information on enrollment in each of the (at the time) four faculties. In a further project, funded by the German Research Foundation, the enrollment forms from 1918 until the co-option and reorganization of the university administration by the National Socialists in 1935 were digitized. These documents form part of the records group 201c Abt. 3 Studium und Lehre. These historical registers and enrollment forms have been made accessible via a special database.

== The Index of Hamburg Professors ==
In cooperation with the Centre for the History of the University of Hamburg, a comprehensive index of the university’s former professors (Hamburger Professorinnen- und Professoren-Katalog, HPK) has been produced and made publicly accessible through a webpage. The HPK covers a timeframe from 1919 until 1921. To mark the hundredth anniversary of the University of Hamburg, the index was designed and developed under the direction of Rainer Nicolaysen and Matthias Glasow. The index was officially presented and published on the 26th of January 2017. Since March 2017 the editorial supervision and updating of the index has been carried out by the University Archives.
