= Reinhard Moratz =

German science educator, academic and researcher

- Born: Herford, North Rhine-Westphalia, Germany
- Occupations: Science educator, academic and researcher

Academic background
- Education: Bachelor in Informatics; Master in Informatics; Doctoral studies in Informatics
- Alma mater: University of Hamburg; Bielefeld University
- Thesis: Hybrid neural and semantic network based scene interpretation of video streams

Academic work
- Institutions: University of Münster

Reinhard Moratz is a German science educator, academic and researcher. He is Ausserplanmässiger Professor at the University of Münster’s Institute for Geoinformatics. He has worked on spatial cognition and reasoning, qualitative theories of low-dimensional entities like straight line segments and oriented points, artificial intelligence and specifically the OPRA calculus. His research is based on computational models that account for the varying reference frames used in giving verbal instructions about navigation.

Moratz has published various research papers and is the author of Visuelle Objekterkennung als kognitive Simulation and co-editor of the conference proceedings of the Conference on Spatial Information Theory 2011 (COSIT 2011). Moratz's work has been published in Artificial Intelligence. He is a former member of the National Center for Geographic Information and Analysis (NCGIA).

== Education ==
Moratz completed his Bachelor and Master in Informatics from the University of Hamburg. He then received Doctoral degree in the same field from Bielefeld University.

== Career ==
Moratz started his academic career as an assistant professor at University of Bremen in 2001. He worked in the industry prior to receiving his Habilitation degree in Computer Science in 2008. Moratz then moved to the USA and was appointed as associate professor at University of Maine’s College of Engineering. He also served as the Director of the Human Robot Interaction Laboratory at the university. Parallel to this appointment, he was elected as a member of the National Center for Geographic Information and Analysis (NCGIA). In 2017, Moratz resigned from his positions at the University of Maine. He then returned to Germany, where he was appointed as Ausserplanmässiger Professor at the University of Münster's Institute for Geo-informatics in November 2018.

== Research ==
Moratz's research is primarily focused on the spatial application of artificial intelligence and cognitive science. He uses both formal and empirical methods to work on representing and modeling spatial cognition. His major scientific contributions include building bridges between calculi for Qualitative Spatial Reasoning (QSR) and human natural language.

=== Compatibility of QSR calculi and human linguistic expressions ===
Moratz investigated spatial communication in linguistic human-robot interaction and found that linguistic constituents can be successfully mapped onto projective relations of positional QSR calculi. He designed a new calculi with finer distinctions regarding the constraint-based spatial reasoning. His work combines qualitative spatial and linguistic knowledge and has applications in human-robot interaction. Moratz's research also contributes to spatial representations as modules in ontologies. He also worked on spatial references to objects in human-robot interactions.

=== Relation between entities of QSR calculi and perceived objects ===
Moratz has also conducted research on the relation between QSR calculus entities and perceived objects. He worked on identifying the real world objects that corresponded to spatial entities related to QSR calculi. He also conducted research on methods for detecting these real world objects through an automatic perception. His approach for function-based object recognition contributed to the link between sensorically registered object features and entities to reason about. His function-based object recognition uses the visually perceived function that is offered by constructed objects. Moratz's research indicates that certain spatial invariants can be used to detect meaningful high-level object classes, as object shape is typically determined by object function.

Moratz's work has applications in the fields of mobile service robots, Geographic Information Systems, smart items, semantic technologies and location-based services, among others.

== Bibliography ==
=== Books ===
- Visuelle Objekterkennung als kognitive Simulation(1997) ISBN 978-3-89838-174-1
- Spatial Information Theory: 10th International Conference, COSIT 2011, Belfast, ME, USA (2011) ISBN 978-3-642-23195-7

=== Selected articles ===
- Moratz, Reinhard; Ragni, Marco (2008). "Qualitative spatial reasoning about relative point position". Journal of Visual Languages & Computing. 19 (1). Elsevier BV: 75–98. doi:10.1016/j.jvlc.2006.11.001. ISSN 1045-926X.
- Moratz, Reinhard; Tenbrink, Thora (2006). "Spatial Reference in Linguistic Human-Robot Interaction: Iterative, Empirically Supported Development of a Model of Projective Relations". Spatial Cognition & Computation. 6 (1). Informa UK Limited: 63–107. Bibcode:2006SpCC....6...63M. doi:10.1207/s15427633scc0601_3. ISSN 1387-5868. S2CID 18996294.
- Mossakowski, Till; Moratz, Reinhard (2012). "Qualitative reasoning about relative direction of oriented points". Artificial Intelligence. 180–181. Elsevier BV: 34–45. arXiv:1011.0098. doi:10.1016/j.artint.2011.10.003. ISSN 0004-3702.
- Moratz, Reinhard; Wallgrün, Jan Oliver (19 December 2012). "Spatial reasoning with augmented points: Extending cardinal directions with local distances". Journal of Spatial Information Science (5). doi:10.5311/josis.2012.5.84. ISSN 1948-660X.
- Moratz, Reinhard; Lücke, Dominik; Mossakowski, Till (2011). "A condensed semantics for qualitative spatial reasoning about oriented straight line segments". Artificial Intelligence. 175 (16–17). Elsevier BV: 2099–2127. arXiv:0912.5533. doi:10.1016/j.artint.2011.07.004. ISSN 0004-3702.
