= Wolfgang Hoffmann-Riem =

German legal scholar and former justice of the Federal Constitutional Court of Germany

Justice of the Federal Constitutional Court of Germany
- In office 16 December 1999 – 2 April 2008

Wolfgang Hoffmann-Riem (born March 4, 1940, in Hannover) is a German legal scholar and a former justice of the Federal Constitutional Court of Germany.

== Career ==
Wolfgang Hoffmann-Riem was born into a family of teachers. He had four siblings, one of whom died at a very young age. After passing the general qualification for university entrance (Abitur) at the Walddörfer-Gymnasium in Hamburg, he studied law while minoring in economics at the University of Hamburg, the University of Freiburg, LMU Munich, and the University of California, Berkeley. He was awarded an LL.M. at Berkeley. In 1964, he passed the first state examination and in 1968 obtained a doctorate in law. After passing the second state examination in 1970, he spent four years working as a lawyer. In 1974, he obtained his postdoctoral qualification (Habilitation), which led to an appointment as professor of public law and public administration at the University of Hamburg. From 1977 to 1979, he was the spokesperson for Law Department II at the University of Hamburg, which offered a new single-tier law education as an alternative to the traditional two-tier education in Law Department I. He was offered but declined faculty appointments at Leibniz University Hannover, the University of Frankfurt am Main, and the Free University of Berlin.

From 1979 to 1995, Hoffmann-Riem was director of the Hans-Bredow-Institut for media research, which is affiliated with the University of Hamburg, and from July 1998 until December 1999, he chaired its newly created directorate. Following his appointment as judge of the Federal Constitutional Court, he became an honorary member of the directorate. From 1981 to 1983, he served as chair of the German Association for the Sociology of Law and from 1989 to 1992 as chair of the German Communication Association (Deutsche Gesellschaft für Publizistik- und Kommunikationswissenschaft, DGPuK). Since 1988, he has been director of the Research Centre for Environmental Law and from 1996 to 2012 director of the Centre for Research in Law and Innovation, CERI, both at the University of Hamburg. From 1995 to 1997, he was Minister of Justice of the State of Hamburg. During this period, he also chaired the Committee on Legal Affairs of the German Bundesrat. From 1999 to 2008, he served as judge in the First Senate of the Federal Constitutional Court. In 2007, he was appointed by the federal government as the German representative on the European Commission for Democracy through Law, also known as the Venice Commission. In 2009/10, Hoffmann-Riem was a Fellow at the Institute for Advanced Study (Wissenschaftskolleg) in Berlin. Since 2012, he serves as affiliate professor of law and innovation at the Bucerius Law School, Hamburg.

== Main Areas of Research ==
Hoffmann-Riem has sought to change the understanding of law as a discipline dealing mainly with the interpretation of norms to one in which actions and decisions focus on resolution of problems. Emphasizing the problem-solving capacity of the legal system, he has maintained that law can help overcome social problems and achieve resolution of specific conflicts if suitable frameworks are deployed in a legal system that is efficient and results-oriented. In his view, this concept derives from the interaction between norms and social reality – that is, the operative area of norms (the so-called "Realbereich") – and from the effects of the way in which law is applied, with such effects being measured across disciplines by incorporating sociology, economics, and natural sciences.

This fundamental understanding has been given expression by Hoffmann-Riem throughout all phases of his extensive career and research. An example of this is his role in reforming legal education in Germany. Traditionally having two parts, the manner of instruction he helped to create forged a stronger bond between the once-separate theoretical and practical aspects. In numerous advisory roles with governments, parliaments, and organizations, as well as his participation in a variety of commissions, he has strived to include the voice of practitioners. In addition, his extensive research and teaching engagements abroad (e.g., at Stanford, Berkeley, Harvard, and Melbourne) have enabled him to incorporate views from other legal systems as well. In analyzing the problems and possibilities associated with legal regulation, in the beginning he has focused on the media. Thanks to ground-breaking technological breakthroughs (cable and satellite television, digitalization, the Internet) and accompanying shifts in the market, this area has offered him a rich source of material for studying the interplay between responses at the law-making level and social, technological, economic, and political developments. While this transformation was happening, he was head of the Hans Bredow Institute for Radio and Television, whose main focus was on sociological issues.

Hoffmann-Riem has seen environmental law as another example of a field warranting closer examination of the problems associated with traditional governmental regulation – variously characterized by writers as a "crisis" – and of the need for new regulatory approaches. On these topics, his primary interest has been the interplay between governmental and private entities (so-called "cooperative administrative law"), specifically the question of just what type of law is required when the state largely turns over its public-interest responsibilities to the private sector while remaining tasked with their fulfillment. In an attempt to describe this dynamic, he coined the term "regulated self-regulation."

Since 2016, he has placed a focus of his academic work on the legal handling of the digital transformation and on the opportunities, but also disruptive potentials, associated with this development. He has inquired ways to improve the protection of individual and public interests and pointed to the inevitability of a substantive transformation of important parts of the legal system and the approaches of legal scholarship in line with the digital transformation. This topic is addressed, most notably, in his monograph "Recht im Sog der digitalen Transformation" (Law in the Wake of Digital Transformation, 2022).

In the early 1990s, Hoffmann-Riem initiated a systematic discussion among academics and practitioners on the need and possible options for the reform of administrative law. In doing so, he gained the support of the renowned Heidelberg scholar Eberhard Schmidt-Aßmann. This discussion resulted in a ten-volume series entitled "The Reform of Administrative Law" ("Schriften zur Reform des Verwaltungsrechts"), published by Nomos Verlag. Another project ensuing from this discussion on reform was a systematic handbook with Hoffmann-Riem as editor – again with Schmidt-Aßmann and also Andreas Voßkuhle – entitled "Fundamentals of Administrative Law" ("Grundlagen des Verwaltungsrechts"), which have been published in 2006 till 2009, second edition 2012/2013. Fifty authors contributed to this project.

In the 1990s, taking note of on-going public criticism that the ability of German society to innovate was hamstrung on account of restrictions imposed by law, Hoffmann-Riem called for the establishment of a new legal discipline, which came to be called research in law and innovation (see, e.g., "Research in Law and Innovation" ["Schriften zur rechtswissenschaftlichen Innovationsforschung"], published by Nomos Verlag). In 1995 he founded the Centre for Research in Law and Innovation (CERI) at the University of Hamburg and undertook several research projects on the importance of law in society-based technological and social innovation.

During his tenure as Senator of Justice in the Hamburg Senate, Hoffmann-Riem conceived and initiated an overhaul of Hamburg's judicial administration termed "Justice 2000", which became a model for other German states.

== Judge of the German Federal Constitutional Court ==
In 1999 the German Social Democratic Party (SPD) nominated the politically unaffiliated scholar Hoffman-Riem as judge of the Federal Constitutional Court, and he was subsequently elected by the Bundesrat. His scope of responsibility encompassed, inter alia, freedom of speech, freedom of the press, freedom of assembly, general protection of privacy, protection of personal information, and competition law. In the aftermath of the terrorist attacks on September 11, 2001, he authored a series of decisions that gave rise to spirited public debate, including those on freedom of assembly and the relationship between freedom and security (for example, decisions on sweeping wiretapping powers ["Großen Lauschangriff"], wiretapping using foreign trade law or general police regulations, profiling, online searches, automated recording of car license plates, and data retention.) While recognizing the need for the state to ensure public safety, the Constitutional Court held that guarantees afforded by the rule of law may not be ignored and governmental power must be limited, and even in the face of perceived threats, it is paramount that the principles of proportionality and certainty in the application of law be respected and procedural safeguards be maintained. In these decisions (for example, in the ruling dealing with online searches), the Constitutional Court dealt extensively with developments in current technology that have long been the subject of Hoffmann-Riem's research.

== Honors ==
In 2008 the German Federal President bestowed on Hoffmann-Riem the Order of Merit of the Federal Republic of Germany.

Hoffmann-Riem holds the Grand Cross of Merit with Star and Shoulder Ribbon, which was awarded to him by the Federal President in 2008. He is also the recipient of the Emil von Sauer Prize. In 2024, he was awarded an honorary doctorate by the Pontifícia Universidade Católica of Brazil.

== Publications ==
The entire list of Hoffmann-Riem's publications can be found on the homepage of Bucerius Law School.

Some of his most important publications have been republished in the following anthologies:

- Wandel der Medienordnung. Reaktionen von Medienrecht, Medienpolitik und Medienwissenschaft, Nomos, Baden Baden 2009, ISBN 3-832-95152-0.
- Offene Rechtswissenschaft. Ausgewählte Schriften und begleitende Analysen, Mohr Siebeck, Tübingen 2010, ISBN 3-161-50352-X.
