= Erich Marcks (historian) =

German historian (1861–1938)

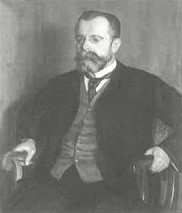
Portrait of Erich Marcks by Leopold Graf von Kalckreuth

Erich Marcks (17 November 1861 – 22 November 1938) was a German historian.

== Life and career ==
Born in Magdeburg, the son of the Protestant architect and government builder Albrecht Marcks († 1888), after attending the Magdeburg Pädagogium zum Kloster Unser lieben Frauen from 1879, studied in Magdeburg, Alte Geschichte first in Straßburg, later at Bonn and Berlin, among others with liberal teachers like Heinrich Nissen and Theodor Mommsen. In 1884, Marcks completed his doctorate under Nissen in Strasbourg about Roman history (The Tradition of the Social War (91-87 BC). Under the influence of Hermann Baumgarten and Heinrich von Treitschke, he oriented himself towards modern and contemporary history and habilitated in 1887 in Berlin with the latter on Gaspard II de Coligny and the Assassination of Francis, Duke of Guise, supplemented by the essays he had submitted up to that time.

In 1892, the University of Freiburg appointed Marcks as full professor. Further stations in his academic career were professorships at Leipzig in 1894, Heidelberg University in 1901, Hamburg Scientific Foundation in 1907, the US, where he was a visiting professor in 1912, and, from 1913, Munich. In 1922 he was appointed to Berlin, where he taught until his retirement in 1928.

From his time in Leipzig, Marcks was a member of the Saxon Academy of Sciences from 1898. From 1898, he was a corresponding member of the Bavarian Academy of Sciences and Humanities and, in addition, from 1923, president of the Historical Commission at the Bavarian Academy of Sciences. From 1922, he was a full member of the Prussian Academy of Sciences, In 1936, he became a member of the Austrian Academy of Sciences. From 1902 to 1903, he was chairman of the Verband der Historiker und Historikerinnen Deutschlands. In 1900, he received the Knight's Cross 1st Class of the Civil Order of Saxony, in 1903 the Knight's Cross 1st Class with Oak Leaves of the Order of the Zähringer Lion of Baden.

From 1910, Marcks was co-editor of the Historische Zeitschrift alongside his friend Friedrich Meinecke, together with whom he was also appointed Historiographer of the Prussian State in 1922.

Although Marcks, as a Neo-Rankean, was an avowed follower of Leopold von Ranke's "objectified" historiography, he developed under the influence of Treitschke into one of the leading representatives of a nationalist politicised historiography. His main work influenced by this was a highly influential two-volume biography of Otto von Bismarck (published in 1909 and 1915), which celebrated the first Reich Chancellor as the consummator of German history and with which Marcks showed himself to be a herald of the authoritarian power state.

The Third Reich was regarded by Marcks as a contemporary re-establishment of the Bismarck Empire, and so in 1935 he became an honorary member of Walter Frank's National Socialist Reichsinstitut für Geschichte des neuen Deutschlands. In addition, in 1936 he was honoured with the Adlerschild des Deutschen Reiches, the highest civilian award of the German Reich instituted by the Weimar Republic.

Marcks' marriage to Friederike von Sellin (born 1865) in 1889 produced three sons, Albert, who died in the First World War in 1914, Erich, later a general, and Otto. The daughter Gertrud (Gerta) married Marcks' pupil Willy Andreas. A cousin of Erich Marcks was the sculptor and graphic artist Gerhard Marcks.

Marcks died, just a few days after his 77th birthday, on 22 November 1938 in Berlin. His grave at the Friedhof Heerstraße in Berlin-Westend (Field-8B-35/36) was cleared after 2005.

== Publications ==
- Die Überlieferung des Bundesgenossenkrieges 91–89 v. Chr. Elwert, Marburg 1884 (Dissertation University of Straßburg 1884, 92 pages).
- Gaspard von Coligny. Sein Leben und das Frankreich seiner Zeit. Stuttgart 1892.
- Kaiser Wilhelm I. Leipzig 1897, 9th edition 1943.
- Königin Elisabeth von England und ihre Zeit. Bielefeld 1897.
- Die Zusammenkunft von Bayonne. Das französische Staatsleben und Spanien in den Jahren 1563–1567. Straßburg 1898.
- Bismarck. Eine Biographie. First volume: Bismarcks Jugend 1815–1848. Stuttgart 1909.
- Männer und Zeiten. Aufsätze und Reden zur neueren Geschichte. 2 volumes. Leipzig 1911, 7th edition 1941.
- Otto von Bismarck – ein Lebensbild. Stuttgart 1915, 28th edition 1935.
- Geschichte und Gegenwart. 5 Historisch-politische Reden. Stuttgart 1925.
- (contribution) Das Zeitalter der religiösen Umwälzung. Reformation und Gegenreformation. 1550–1660 (= Propyläen Weltgeschichte. Volume 5), Berlin 1930.
- Der Aufstieg des Reiches. Deutsche Geschichte von 1807–1871/78. 2 volumes. Volume 1: Die Vorstufen. Volume 2: Bismarck. Deutsche Verlagsanstalt, Stuttgart 1936.
- Bismarck und die deutsche Revolution 1848–1851. Edited from the estate and introduced by Willy Andreas. Deutsche Verlagsanstalt, Stuttgart 1939.
- Englands Machtpolitik. Vorträge und Studien. New ed. and introduced by Willy Andreas. Deutsche Verlagsanstalt, Stuttgart 1940.
