= Hamburg Colonial Institute =

Former higher education institution

The Hamburg Colonial Institute (German: Hamburgisches Kolonialinstitut) was a higher education establishment founded in 1908 by the City of Hamburg with the support of Bernhard Dernburg, head of the Imperial Colonial Office. In 1919 it was merged with the Hamburg Scientific Foundation to create the University of Hamburg.

The institute was established with two main tasks:

1. Training civil servants referred to the institute by the Imperial Colonial Office as wellas other people who intend to emigrate to the German protectorates
2. The creation of a centre for scientific and economic colonial research
