= Hans-Bredow-Institut =

German research institute

The Leibniz-Institut für Medienforschung, Hans-Bredow-Institut (HBI) is an independent non-profit foundation with the mission of media research on public communication, particularly for radio and television broadcasting (including public service media providers) and other electronic media, in an interdisciplinary fashion.

== History ==
Established on 30 May 1950, the Institute was founded by then Nordwestdeutscher Rundfunk (NWDR) and the University of Hamburg as a legal foundation. Named after the "Father of German Broadcasting" Hans Bredow (1879–1959), the Institute was founded on his idea of broadcasting councils, an unprecedented notion for media governance at the time. It rejects both the German bureaucratic state of the Weimar period and the Nazi seizure of power, and favours organizational structures that included political representations and civic organizations. In 1954, Bredow was awarded the Knight Commander's Cross of the Order of Merit of the Federal Republic of Germany for his contribution in building the organizational structures of broadcasting in the Federal Republic. Hans Bredow's place in German broadcasting history was compared to John Reith's in British broadcasting history.

The original name of the institute was Hans-Bredow-Institut für Rundfunk und Fernsehen (Hans Bredow Institute for Radio and Television), as its initial goal was to conduct media research in the field of radio and television. With the onset of digitalisation in the 1990s, the institute's focus also changed. Subsequently, the institute was renamed the Hans-Bredow-Institut für Medienforschung (Hans Bredow Institute for Media Research).

The institute is known for being interdisciplinary. This interdisciplinary orientation is reflected in the professional backgrounds of the respective directors: From 1950 to 1967, the institute was headed by historian Egmont Zechlin, from 1968 to 1970 by educational scientist Hans Wenke, and from 1971 to 1979 by sociologist Janpeter Kob. From 1979 to 1995, the institute was headed by the legal scholar Wolfgang Hoffmann-Riem, and from 1995 to 1998 by the political scientist and media scholar Otfried Jarren.

Since 1998, the scientific management and administration of the institute has been in the hands of a scientific board of directors, which represents the two main pillars of the institute's work: communication research and legal media research. Initially, the directorate consisted of Wolfgang Hoffmann-Riem (until December 1999), Otfried Jarren (until July 2001), and communication scholar Uwe Hasebrink. From July 2001 onward, the directorate consisted of Uwe Hasebrink and legal scholar Wolfgang Schulz (chair). Following Hasebrink's retirement, Schulz headed the directorate alone. Since March 2025, Wolfgang Schulz and Judith Möller have served as the institute's scientific directors.

Together with various German institutions in Berlin, the Hans-Bredow-Institut joins the foundation of a research centre on Internet and Society in 2011 called the Alexander von Humboldt Institute for Internet and Society. Its director Wolfgang Schulz is also one of the directors of the Alexander von Humboldt Institute for Internet and Society in Berlin.

The institute has been a member of the Leibniz Association since 1 January 2019, and has hence changed its name to Leibniz Institute for Media Research │ Hans-Bredow-Institut (HBI).

== Research and funding ==
The HBI researches media-mediated public communication, combining perspectives from social sciences and law. The research is divided into three research programs: Transformation of public communication, regulatory structures and rule formation in digital communication spaces, and knowledge for the media society. The institute also operates a public scientific library.

Since joining the Leibniz Association in January 2019, the institute has been funded proportionally by the German Federal Ministry of Research, Technology and Space and joint research funding from the federal states, represented by the Authority for Science, Research, and Equality (BWFG) of city of Hamburg. In addition, there are donations and income from third-party funded projects. In 2023, the institute was awarded extensive research funds of about €10.3 million.

== Publications ==
=== Journal Medien & Kommunikationswissenschaft (M&K) ===
The institue has been publishing the academic journal Medien & Kommunikationswissenschaft (Media & Communication Studies) since 1953. Until 1999, it was titled Rundfunk und Fernsehen (Radio and Television). It is published four times a year by Nomos Publishing House, and is an interdisciplinary forum for theoretical and empirical contributions from the entire field of media and communication studies.

=== Podcast BredowCast ===
Since 2014, the institute has been publishing a monthly podcast in which research projects and current topics from the world of media are discussed.

=== Internationales Handbuch Medien ===
The Institute is known by media researchers for its publication of the International Media Handbook Internationales Handbuch Medien (International Media Handbook). The handbook was published by the institute from 1957 until 2009. It provided concise information on the legal and organisational foundations of print, broadcast, and online media, the most important players, programming, and development trends in European countries and countries around the world.
