= University of Hamburg =

Public university in Hamburg, Germany

Coordinates: 53°34′01″N 9°59′02″E

- Universität Hamburg
- Latin: Universitas Hamburgensis
- Motto: Der Forschung, der Lehre, der Bildung
- Motto in English: For research, for teaching, for education
- Type: Public
- Established: 28 March 1919; 107 years ago
- Academic affiliations: EUA, Campus Europae, German U15, German Excellence Initiative
- Budget: €700 million
- Chancellor: Martin Hecht
- President: Hauke Heekeren
- Academic staff: 15,331
- Administrative staff: 8,896
- Students: 42,819
- Doctoral students: 5,898
- Location: Hamburg, Germany
- Campus: Urban
- Colours: Red and white
- Website: uni-hamburg.de

- Location within Germany Location within Hamburg

The University of Hamburg (German: Universität Hamburg, also referred to as UHH) is a public research university in Hamburg, Germany. It was founded on 28 March 1919 by combining the previous General Lecture System (Allgemeines Vorlesungswesen), the Hamburg Colonial Institute (Hamburgisches Kolonialinstitut), and the Academic College (Akademisches Gymnasium). The main campus is located in the central district of Rotherbaum, with affiliated institutes and research centres distributed around the city-state. Seven Nobel Prize winners and one Wolf Prize winner are affiliated with UHH.

== History ==
=== Founding ===
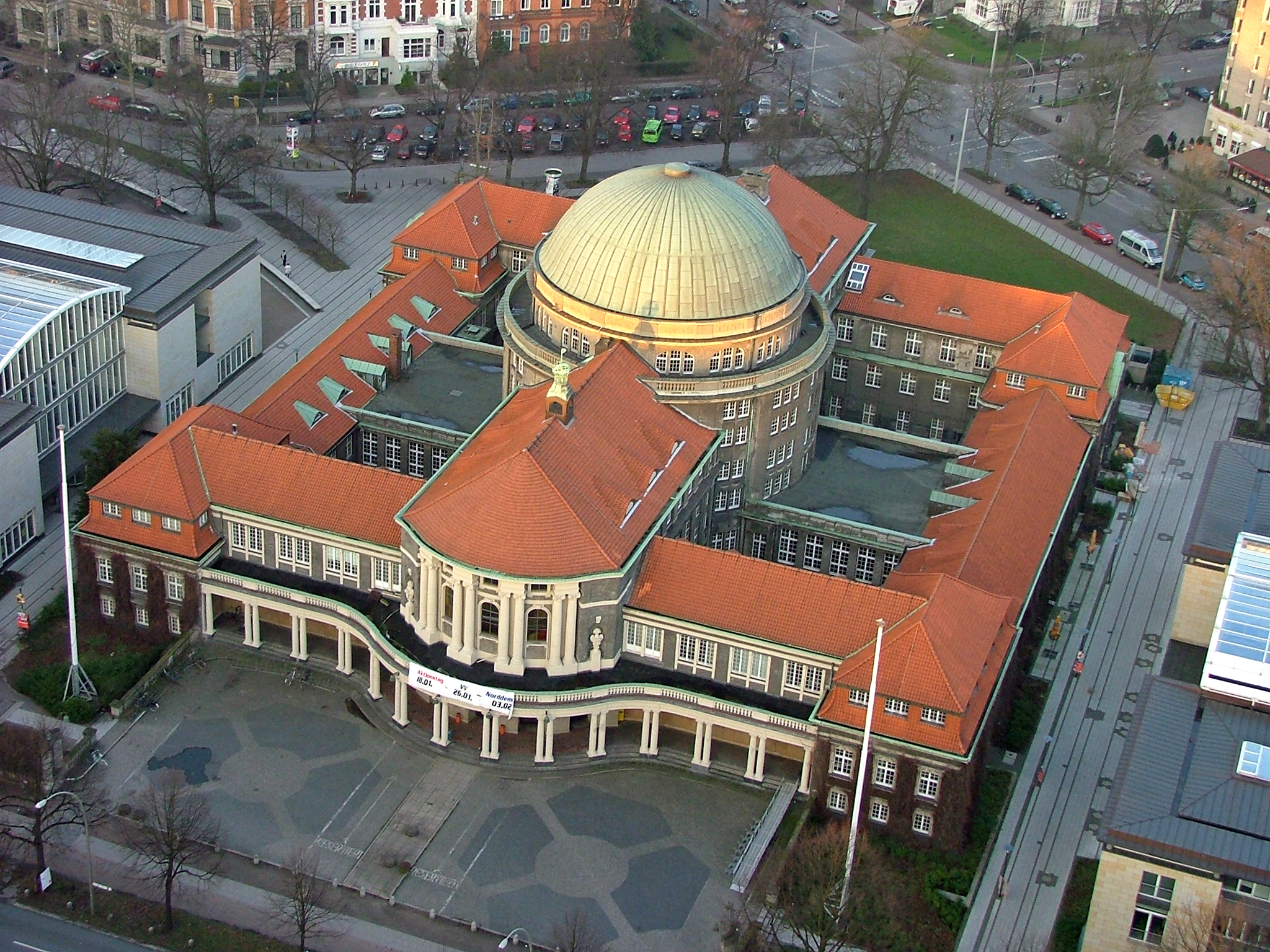
University Main Building (built 1911)

At the beginning of the 20th century, wealthy individuals made several unsuccessful petitions to the Hamburg Senate and Parliament requesting the establishment of a university. Senator Werner von Melle worked towards the merging of existing institutions into one university, but this plan failed. Much of the establishment wanted to see Hamburg limited to its role as a trading center, and were concerned about both the costs of a university and the social ambitions of professors who would be recruited by the university.

In 1907 proponents of a university founded the Hamburg Scientific Foundation (Hamburgische Wissenschaftliche Stiftung), followed by the Hamburg Colonial Institute in 1908. The Science Foundation supported the recruitment of scholars for the chairs of the General Lecture System and funding of research cruises, while the Colonial Institute was responsible for all education and research questions concerning overseas territories. In 1911 the city's first lecture building opened, later becoming the main building of the university. Plans for the foundation of the university itself were shelved due to the outbreak of the First World War.

After the war, the first freely elected senate chose von Melle as mayor. He and Rudolf Ross advocated for education reform in Hamburg, and were able to pass a law establishing both the university and an adult high school. On 28 March 1919, the University of Hamburg opened its gates, increasing the number of full professorships in Hamburg from 19 to 39. Both the Colonial Institute and the General Lecture System were absorbed into the university. The university's first Schools, or Faculties, were Law and Political Science, Medicine, Philosophy and Natural Sciences.

=== Weimar Republic and the National Socialist Era ===
During the Weimar Republic, the university quickly grew to become important. The student population reached several thousand, and the growing popularity of the university drew scholars such as Albrecht Mendelssohn Bartholdy, Aby Warburg and Ernst Cassirer to Hamburg. Many students were suffering due to the poor economic situation that prevailed in the early republic, leading to the foundation of the Hamburg Association of Student Aid in 1922. Ernst Cassirer became the principal of the university in 1929, one of the first Jewish scholars to take that role in Germany. The number of full professors had grown to 75 by 1931.

The academic situation shifted quickly after the general election in March 1933. On 1 May of that year, the university held a ceremony to honor Adolf Hitler as its leader. Massive political influence by the Nazis followed, including the removal of books from the libraries and harassment against alleged enemies of the regime. About 50 scientists, including Ernst Cassirer and William Stern, had to leave the university. At least 10 Hamburg students were suspected of working with the White Rose and arrested; four died in custody or were executed. A commemorative plate depicting the foyer of the lecture hall, designed by Fritz Fleer, was produced in 1971 in their memory.

=== In the Federal Republic of Germany ===
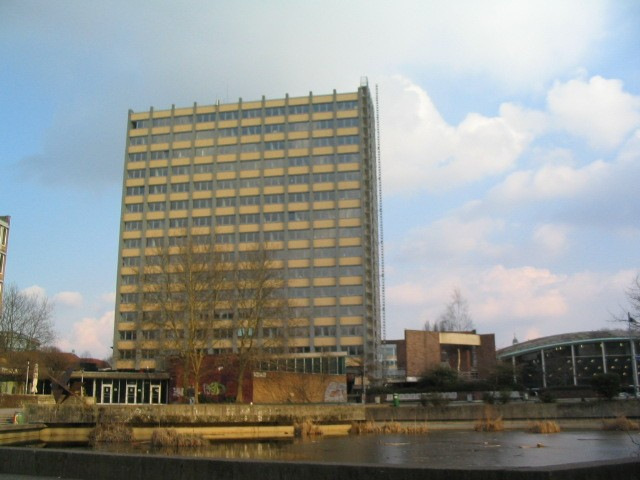
Philosopher's Tower, built in 1962

Once the Second World War was over, the university reopened in the winter of 1945 with 17,800 employees. Of the 2,872 students who were enrolled at the University of Hamburg in the first postwar semester of 1945/46, 601 had been admitted to the School of Philosophy, 952 to the School of Medicine, 812 to the School of Law and Political Science, and 506 to the School of Mathematics and Natural Sciences. The first student association during this period was elected in 1946 under British supervision, and it became the foundation of the General Students' Committee, AStA, in 1947.

During the West German era, new departments were added to the university. In 1954 the School of Protestant Theology was added, and the School of Law separated from the School of Economic and Social Sciences. This growth was accompanied by significant construction in the late 1950s and early 1960s. The Auditorium and the Philosopher's Tower were inaugurated near the Von-Melle-Park, while the Botanical Institute and Botanical Garden were relocated to Flottbeck. The university grew from 12,600 students in 1960 to 19,200 in 1970.

A wave of protests during the student movements of 1968 resulted in a reform of the university's structure. In 1969, the Faculties were dissolved in favor of more interdisciplinary departments. The involvement of students and staff in the administration was also increased, and the office of Rektor was abolished in favor of a university president. Parts of these reforms were rescinded in 1979 as part of the Hamburg Higher Education Act. The main campus in the Rotherbaum quarter was completed with additional construction in the 1970s, including the Geomatikum building and the Wiwi-Bunker (named for its bunker-like architecture). After this, growth focused on other parts of Hamburg. Two newly constructed buildings were opened adjacent to the Main Building in 1998 and 2002, revitalizing the Moorweide area of the university.

In 2005, the Hamburg University of Economy and Politics was merged into the University of Hamburg by a political act that was opposed by both institutions. Under the same act, the 17 departments of the two institutions were merged and restructured into six faculties. The implementation of the Bologna process, an effort to ensure comparability of standards across European institutions, was another major point of contention during that decade. Tuition fees were introduced at €500 in 2006, but later reduced to €375 and fully abolished in 2012.

== Campus ==
The University of Hamburg is made up of over 180 properties scattered throughout the city. The Main Building stands on the Moorweide opposite Hamburg Dammtor station, not far from the main campus at Von-Melle-Park. The State and University Library Hamburg, the Audimax (Auditorium), the Hamburg University Archive and several other teaching buildings are all located in that area. The second cluster of university buildings is grouped around Martin Luther King Square in the same quarter. The Geomatikum marks the western end of the campus, near Schlump Metro Station. Several departments are located in other quarters: Physics is spread over branches at Jungiusstraße, Bergedorf (along with the Hamburg Observatory) and Bahrenfeld (with the world-renowned DESY and other facilities). Biology has locations in Flottbeck, while Computer Sciences moved to Stellingen in 1991. The Medical School is located in the University Hospital Hamburg-Eppendorf.

== Academics ==
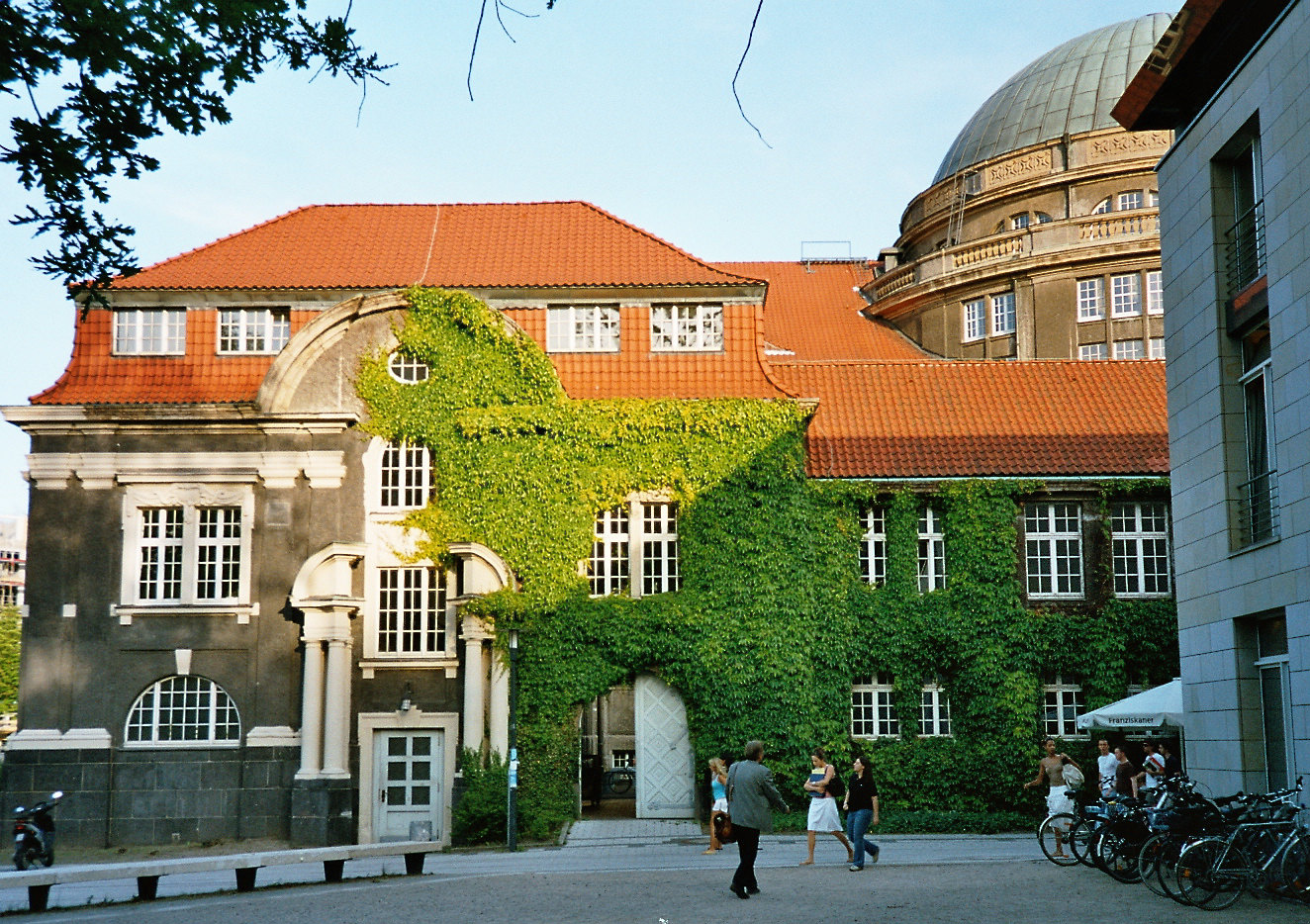
Main Building of the university

As of the 2020–2021 academic year, the total student body is over 44,000, with 10,000 freshmen matriculating each year. Almost 5,500 doctoral candidates are enrolled. 149 different majors are offered by six faculties with almost 700 professors engaged in teaching and research. In addition, over 3,600 academic staff and over 7,000 administrative and technical staff members are employed by the university. The University of Hamburg supports seven Collaborative Research Centers (German: Sonderforschungsbereiche) sponsored by the German Research Foundation.

=== Rankings ===
University rankings

Overall – Global & National
QS World 2026	▼193	9
THE World 2026	▲125	11
ARWU World 2026	201-300	12-21

According to the QS World University Rankings for 2025, the university is ranked 191st globally, placing it within the top 10 nationally. The Times Higher Education (THE) World University Rankings for 2024 listed the university at a joint 136th place globally, translating into a national rank of 12. Furthermore, the 2023 Academic Ranking of World Universities (ARWU) positions the university within a global range of 201-300, corresponding to a national ranking estimated between 10 and 19.

QS World University Rankings by Subject 2023
Subject	Global	National
Arts & Humanities	▲133	▲8
Linguistics	101–150	4–10
Theology, Divinity and Religious Studies	51–100	7–10
History	▲101–150	▲6–8
Modern Languages	101–150	5–7
Philosophy	101–150	▼8–12
Engineering and Technology	N/A	N/A
Computer Science and Information Systems	251–300	13–14
Life Sciences & Medicine	▼146	▲7
Anatomy and Physiology	▲51–100	▲2–6
Biological Sciences	▲137	▲10
Medicine	▲108	▼6
Pharmacy and Pharmacology	151–200	▼10
Psychology	101–150	4–7
Natural Sciences	▲104	▲8–9
Earth and Marine Sciences	51–100	▼2–6
Geography	▼101–150	▼4–7
Geology	51–100	▼2–6
Geophysics	51–100	1–6
Mathematics	201–250	14–15
Physics and Astronomy	▲78	▲6
Social Sciences & Management	▲194	▲7–8
Communication and Media Studies	101–150	3–7
Economics and Econometrics	201–250	9–10
Education and Training	▼151–200	▼6–7
Law and Legal Studies	▲94	5
Politics	▼151–200	▼7–8
Sociology	151–200	▲9–11

THE World University Rankings by Subject 2024
Subject	Global	National
Arts & humanities	▼ =98	8
Business & economics	201–250	10–11
Clinical & health	▼126–150	7–10
Computer science	301–400	24–27
Education	101–125	6
Law	▲42	3
Life sciences	151–175	15–17
Physical sciences	101–125	10–11
Psychology	▲126–150	▲11–14

ARWU Global Ranking of Academic Subjects 2023
Subject	Global	National
Natural Sciences
Physics	51–75	3–4
Earth Sciences	▲101–150	▲5–10
Geography	▼201–300	▼10–15
Ecology	201–300	17–27
Oceanography	▼51–75	▼3–4
Atmospheric Science	76–100	▼3–5
Engineering
Biomedical Engineering	▼201–300	11–13
Computer Science & Engineering	401–500	▲11–16
Environmental Science & Engineering	401–500	▲19–25
Biotechnology	201–300	▲10–16
Life Sciences
Biological Sciences	101–150	▲8–12
Human Biological Sciences	▲51–75	▲5–7
Medical Sciences
Clinical Medicine	101–150	▲5–7
Public Health	201–300	▲7–11
Dentistry & Oral Sciences	▲101–150	▲8–14
Medical Technology	76–100	▲11–14
Pharmacy & Pharmaceutical Sciences	▼301–400	▲17–24
Social Sciences
Economics	201–300	9–13
Law	201–300	3–6
Political Sciences	▼151–200	▼9–11
Sociology	151–200	▼9–11
Education	301–400	▲6–18
Communication	▲101–150	▲8–14
Psychology	▲51–75	▲1–4
Business Administration	▼201–300	▼4–8
Management	201–300	▲3–7
Public Administration	51–75	▲2–3
Hospitality & Tourism Management	201–300	▼2

Measured by the number of top managers in the German economy, UHH ranked 15th in 2019. The Best Global Universities Ranking of the U.S. News & World Report ranked UHH 7th nationally, 44th in Europe and 121st in the world as of 2017.

UHH was ranked 6th in Germany and 186th worldwide by the 2020 CWTS Leiden Ranking. The 2016 Center for World Universities (CWUR) ranked UHH 9th nationally and 170th globally (out of more than 25,000 institutions). The Webometrics Ranking of World Universities, which classifies universities according to volume and impact of web publications, ranked UHH 5th in Germany and 140th worldwide out of roughly 12,000 universities.

In 2016, Eduniversal ranked Universität Hamburg School of Business, Economics and Social Sciences 13th in Germany – between Technical University of Munich and Free University of Berlin.

In 2019, UHH was inducted into German Excellence Strategy of the Federal and State Governments, a competition for top-level university research funding in Germany, with four distinct clusters of Excellence. As of July 2019, UHH is one of eleven universities to be awarded the status of University of Excellence for their "Flagship University" concept.

=== Administrative structure ===
Faculty of Law

- Jurisprudence

Faculty of Business Administration

- Business Administration (BWL)

Faculty of Economics and Social Sciences

- Department of Social Economics
- Department of Social Sciences
- Department of Macroeconomics (VWL)

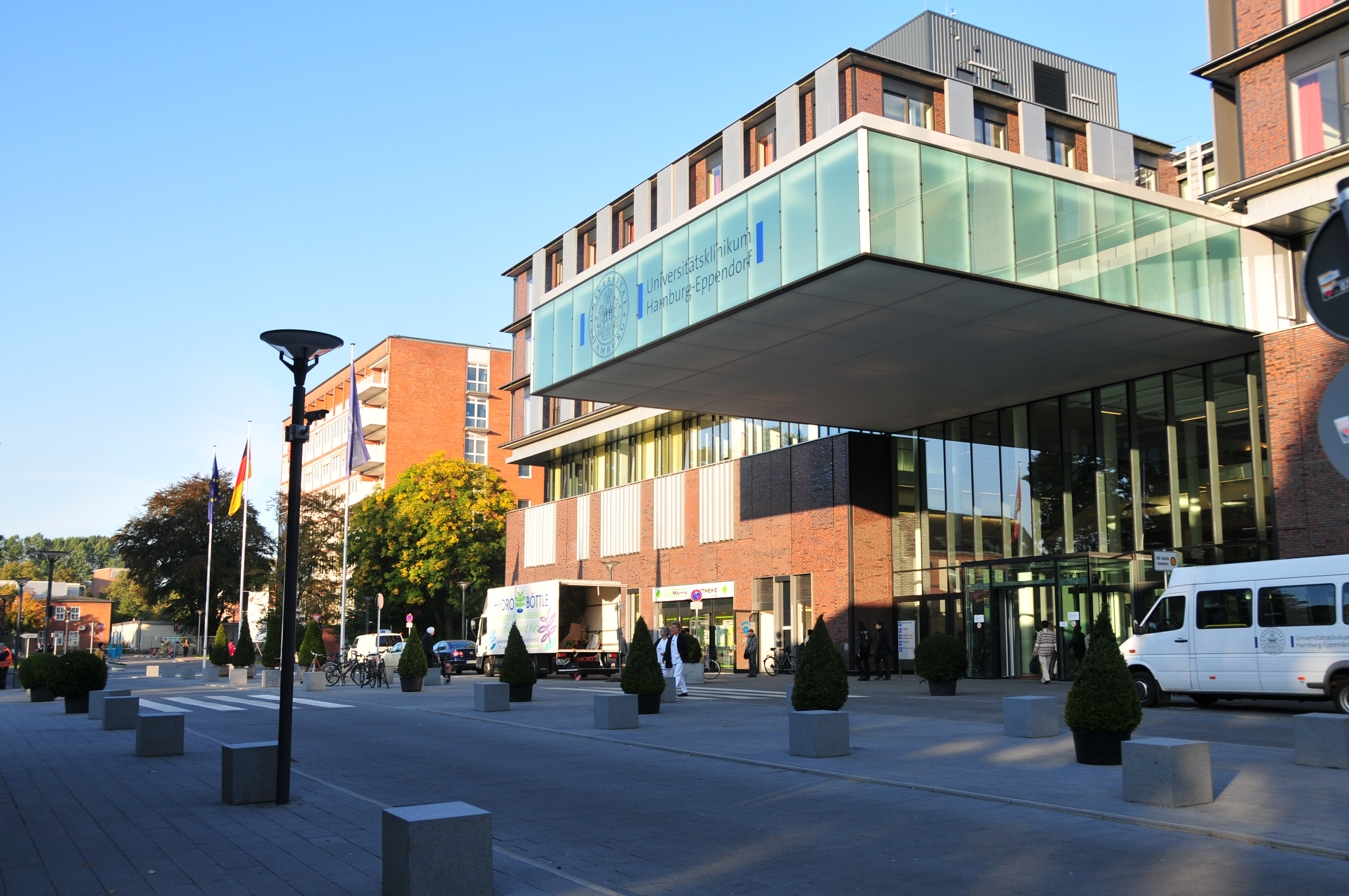
University Medical Center Hamburg-Eppendorf

Faculty of Medicinal Sciences

- Medical Sciences

Faculty of Education, Psychology and Human Movement

- Department of Human Movement
- Department of Education
- Department of Psychology
- Service Department for Evaluation

Faculty of Humanities

- Asia – Africa Institute
- Department of Theology
- Department of History
- Department of Cultural History and Contemporary Culture
- Department of Philosophy
- Department of Language, Literature, Media (SLM)

Faculty of Mathematics, Computer Science and Natural Sciences

- Department of Biology
- Department of Chemistry
- Department of Geosciences
- Department of Computer Science
- Department of Mathematics
- Department of Physics
- Center for Bioinformatics
- Center for Forest Products

== Facilities and associated institutes ==
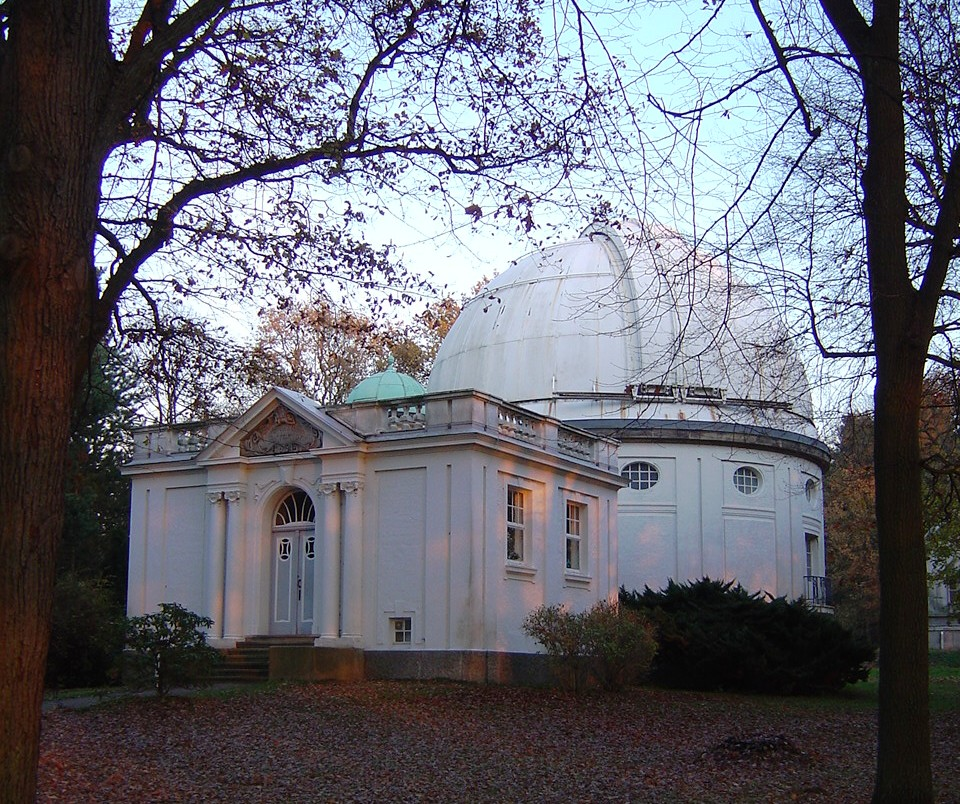
The Hamburg Observatory

The Hamburg State and University Library Carl von Ossietzky, established in 1479, contains over 5 million volumes and is the biggest academic library in the Hamburg metropolitan area. It is also used as a legal deposit and archive for the city-state. It owns a large number of special collections and items of historic value, including medieval manuscripts. Hamburg University Press is also part of the library system. The university formerly operated three natural history museums: Zoological Museum Hamburg, the Mineralogical Museum Hamburg, and the Museum of Geology and Paleontology Hamburg. Since July 2021, they have been part of the Leibniz Institute for the Analysis of Biodiversity Change (LIB) and are collectively known as the Museum of Nature Hamburg. All of these are located on the central campus.

A large number of Associated Institutes (An-Institute) are affiliated with the university, among them the Hans-Bredow-Institut for Media Research and the Leibniz Institute of Virology. Other affiliated institutions include:

- Hamburg Observatory
- German Climate Computing Centre
- Alfred Wegener Institute for Polar and Marine Research
- Bernhard Nocht Institute for Tropical Medicine
- European Molecular Biology Laboratory
- Max Planck Institute for Meteorology
- Max Planck Institute for the Structure and Dynamics of Matter
- Max Planck Institute for Comparative and International Private Law
- Confucius Institute Hamburg
- Hamburg Centre for Ultrafast Imaging
- The China-EU School of Law at China University of Political Science and Law in Beijing, China, which contains 16 member institutions for providing mid-career training, master's degree and joint doctoral research in China-EU Law. UHH was one of the founding members.

== University of Hamburg alumni and faculty ==
=== Students/graduates ===
- Ngozi Alaegbu – Journalist
- Frank Baffoe – Ghanaian economist, diplomat and businessman
- Eberhard Becker – Mathematician
- Wolfgang Burandt – Lawyer, legal academic and professor for commercial law
- Gerd Bucerius – Politician, the namesake of the Bucerius Law School
- Ezriel Carlebach – Israeli journalist and editorial writer
- Shiing-Shen Chern – Winner of Wolf Prize in Mathematics in 1984
- Jürgen Ehlers – Winner of Max Planck Medal in 2002
- Alexander Estis – Swiss author, translator and journalist of Russian origin, winner of the Rolf Bossert Memorial Prize in 2020
- Jürgen Fitschen – Co-CEO of Deutsche Bank from 2009 to 2016
- Rainer Froese – Developer of FishBase
- Klaus Hasselmann – oceanographer and climate modeller, and recipient of the Nobel Prize in Physics in 2021
- Vera Hatz – Royal Numismatic Society medallist
- Harald zur Hausen – Winner of Nobel Prize in Physiology or Medicine 2008
- Ingo Heidbrink – Maritime Historian. Secretary-General of the International Commission for Maritime History
- Lorenz Hilty - Computer Scientist
- Wolfgang Hoffmann-Riem – Legal scholar and a former judge of the Federal Constitutional Court of Germany
- J. Hans D. Jensen – Winner of Nobel Prize in Physics in 1963
- Christine Klein – neurologist, medical researcher and academic
- Jan Kohlhaase – Mathematician
- Hein Kötz – Director of the Max-Planck-Institute for foreign and international private law (MPI-PRIV), the Bucerius Law School and Vice President of the Deutsche Forschungsgemeinschaft
- Hans Adolf Krebs – Winner of Nobel Prize in Physiology or Medicine in 1953
- Jens Marklof – Mathematician and physicist. Winner of the Whitehead Prize.
- Tuhi Martukaw – Taiwanese journalist and diplomat
- Emma Mbua – the first woman from East Africa to become a palaeontologist.
- Reinhard Moratz – Ausserplanmässiger Professor at the University of Münster's Institute for Geoinformatics
- Paul Nevermann – First Mayor of Hamburg (1961–1965)
- Silke Ospelkaus – Group leader at the Max Planck Institute of Quantum Optics
- Jože Pučnik – Known as one of the "Fathers of Slovenian independence from Yugoslavia"
- Dagmar Reichardt – Cultural scholar
- Joachim Ritter – philosopher and founder of the so-called Ritter School of liberal conservatism
- Waldemar R. Röhrbein, historian, director of Historisches Museum Hannover
- Peter Schlechtriem – Law scholar
- Wolfgang Schäuble – Germany's Federal Minister of Finance in the second and third Merkel cabinets since 2009
- Helmut Schmidt – Graduate, Economist, Chancellor of West Germany from 1974 to 1982
- Olaf Scholz – Lawyer, Chancellor of Germany since 2021.
- Klaus-Peter Siegloch – Former journalist and reporter for ZDF
- Peter Sloterdijk – Philosopher and cultural theorist
- Richard Sorge – Famous spy
- Leo Strauss – Political philosopher well known for US esotericism
- Ole Wittmann – German art historian, curator, and publisher

=== Faculty ===
- Helmut Bley – (born 1935), German historian, academic councillor, supervising students from the Third World
- Ernst Cassirer – Neo-Kantian Philosopher and Historian, a professor from 1919 to 1933
- Henry N. Chapman – X-ray physicist and crystallographer, winner of the Leibniz Prize in 2015.
- Emil Artin – Mathematician, a professor from 1923 to 1937
- Curt Kosswig – Zoologist who worked for many years in Turkey before spending 1955–1969 at Hamburg University
- Georg von Dadelsen – Musicologist, 1960 to 1971, Neue Bach-Ausgabe
- Rudolf Fleischmann – Experimental nuclear physicist
- Otto Franke – first Sinology Chair at Hamburg
- Wolfgang Franke – Sinology Chair, son of Otto
- Anke Grotlüschen – Professor for Lifelong Learning.
- Leonhard Harding – (born 1936) historian and scholar in African studies
- Klaus Hasselmann – oceanographer and climate modeller, and recipient of the Nobel Prize in Physics 2021
- Wilhelm Lenz – Physicist, advisor of J. Hans D. Jensen
- Willibald Jentschke – Experimental nuclear physicist
- Klaus Koch – Expert in the growth of Biblical Studies
- Arnold Kohlschütter – Well-known astronomer and astrophysicist
- Yu-chien Kuan – Chinese defector, Sinologist, and writer
- Agathe Lasch – First female professor at Hamburg (1917–1934), Germanic philologist and Holocaust victim
- Wolfgang Paul – Winner of Nobel Prize in Physics in 1989, founder of the DESY.
- Wolfgang Pauli – Winner of Nobel Prize in Physics in 1945
- Johann Radon – Mathematician
- W. G. Sebald – Literary critic and writer
- Otto Stern – Winner of Nobel Prize in Physics in 1943
- William Stern – Inventor of the concept of the intelligence quotient (IQ)
- Jakob Johann von Uexküll – Founder of biosemiotics
- Alfred Wegener – Founder of the continental drift theory
- Carl Friedrich von Weizsäcker – Nuclear physicist known as the longest-living member of the research team that performed nuclear research in Germany during the Second World War

== See also ==
- Education in Hamburg
- Hamburg University of Technology
- List of forestry universities and colleges
- List of modern universities in Europe (1801–1945)
- List of universities in Germany
