= Hamburg Scientific Foundation =

The Hamburg Scientific Foundation (German: Hamburgische Wissenschaftliche Stiftung) was founded in Hamburg in 1907 to support academic research and its dissemination in that city.

Werner von Melle promoted the project from early 1907, raising 3.8 million marks by its foundation on 12 April 1907. One of its first appointments was Erich Marcks, the historian. William Stern and Karl Rathgen were attracted to Hamburg by the funds the foundation made available to them. Between 1908 and 1910 it funded significant research into ethnographic research in the Bismarck Archipelago and the Caroline Islands, located in German New Guinea. Also by financing the publication of academic journals the foundation contributed to the founding of the University of Hamburg in 1919. However assets previously calculated at 7M Marks were almost entirely written off in 1923 during the Hyperinflation in the Weimar Republic.
