= Politics in education =

Politics plays a major role in how schools function, what they teach, and how decisions are made. Politics in education refers to the ways political processes, power dynamics, and public policy shape educational systems. As an academic discipline, the study of politics in education has two main roots: The first root is based on theories from political science, while the second root is rooted in organizational theory. Political science attempts to explain how societies and social organizations use power to establish regulations and allocate resources at the local, state, national, and international levels. Organizational theory uses scientific theories of management to develop a deeper understanding of the functions of organizations, such as how they are structured, operated, and evolve.

== Frameworks ==
=== Micro-politics vs. macro-politics ===
Researchers have drawn a distinction between two types of politics in schools. The term micro-politics refers to the use of formal and informal power by individuals and groups to achieve their goals in organizations. Cooperative and conflictive processes are integral components of micro-politics. Macro-politics refers to how power is used and decision-making is conducted at the district, state, and federal levels. Macro-politics is generally considered to exist outside the school, but researchers have noted that micro- and macro-politics may exist at any level of school systems depending on circumstance.

=== Politics in education vs. politics of education ===
There is a significant difference between politics of education and politics in education. Further debates on the prevailing differences are solicited from academia worldwide to define political education. The politics of education studies the system as a whole and how education policy is shaped by government and political forces. Politics in education examines political issues within classrooms and schools. An example of politics in education is in Freidus and Ewings' article about educational policy. They suggest that an example of politics in education is race in Neoliberal school policies. Politics in education shapes decision making processes within different educational systems.

== In the United States ==
=== Policy ===
Government allocations determine the financial resources available to public schools, including staffing, facilities, and educational services. Education analysts note that political agendas often influence how much funding schools receive and which programs are prioritized. Changes in state or federal leadership can lead to major changes in funding distribution or the implementation of new requirements.

School voucher programs have been a major topic of debate. Supporters argue that vouchers give families more educational choice, while critics say they pull funding from public schools and can increase inequality.

In 2025, with recent developments within Texas public education, political debates intensified around the key issue of the school voucher program. Proponents of the bill argue that vouchers provide families with educational choice, while critics contend that such programs divert funds from traditional public schools and exacerbate educational inequalities. On April 24, 2025, the Texas Legislature approved a $1 billion private school voucher program. Once the bill is signed by Governor Abbott, the program is set to launch in the 2026–27 school year.

=== Curriculum ===
Decisions about curriculum, including which topics are taught and how, are often influenced by political pressures.

Some U.S. school districts encourage teachers to remain neutral when discussing political issues. When teaching about U.S. elections or politics, many educators will strive for neutrality even without the encouragement from the district. Researchers such as Tim Walker note that avoiding topics such as race, immigration, or social inequality can limit students' opportunities to engage with issues that significantly impact their lives. These choices are shaped by what the community wants, district policies, and state-level politics.

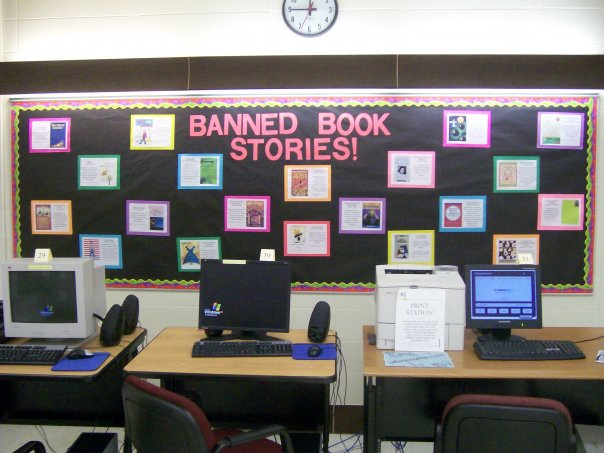
"Books open minds; bans close them."

Political debates over classroom materials have increased in recent years. Regulations in some states determine book bans, how teachers discuss social issues, and what instructional materials align with state standards.

=== Equity ===
Political decisions influence which students have access to resources and safe learning environments.

Book bans in public schools have increased in several states. According to a 2024 PEN America report, more than 4,300 books were removed from U.S. schools between July and December 2023, exceeding the total number removed during the previous school year. Many of the books banned included LGBTQ+ characters or addressed topics such as race, discrimination, or sexual violence.

Florida reported the highest number of book bans during this period, largely due to new state laws regulating the content available in school libraries.

Many argue that political decisions about the curriculum and guidelines can affect students differently. Research shows that marginalized students, such as students of color or LGBTQ+ students, may be more affected when classroom discussions or materials exclude issues relevant to their lives. How the public sees a school's political leanings can influence debates over whether the federal or state government should make decisions, and it can also affect opinions about whether resources are distributed fairly.

=== Classroom instruction and teacher self-censorship ===
Political pressures affect what teachers feel comfortable teaching in the classroom. With many debates about race, gender, sexual orientation and immigration issues affects how teachers approach their delivery in the classroom. In March of 2022, the state of Florida implemented the Parental Rights Education Act, banning classroom instruction on sexual orientation and gender identity; causing teachers to be careful on the subject and also how they support their students.
