= Friederike Sophie Seyler =

German actress and playwright (1738–1789)

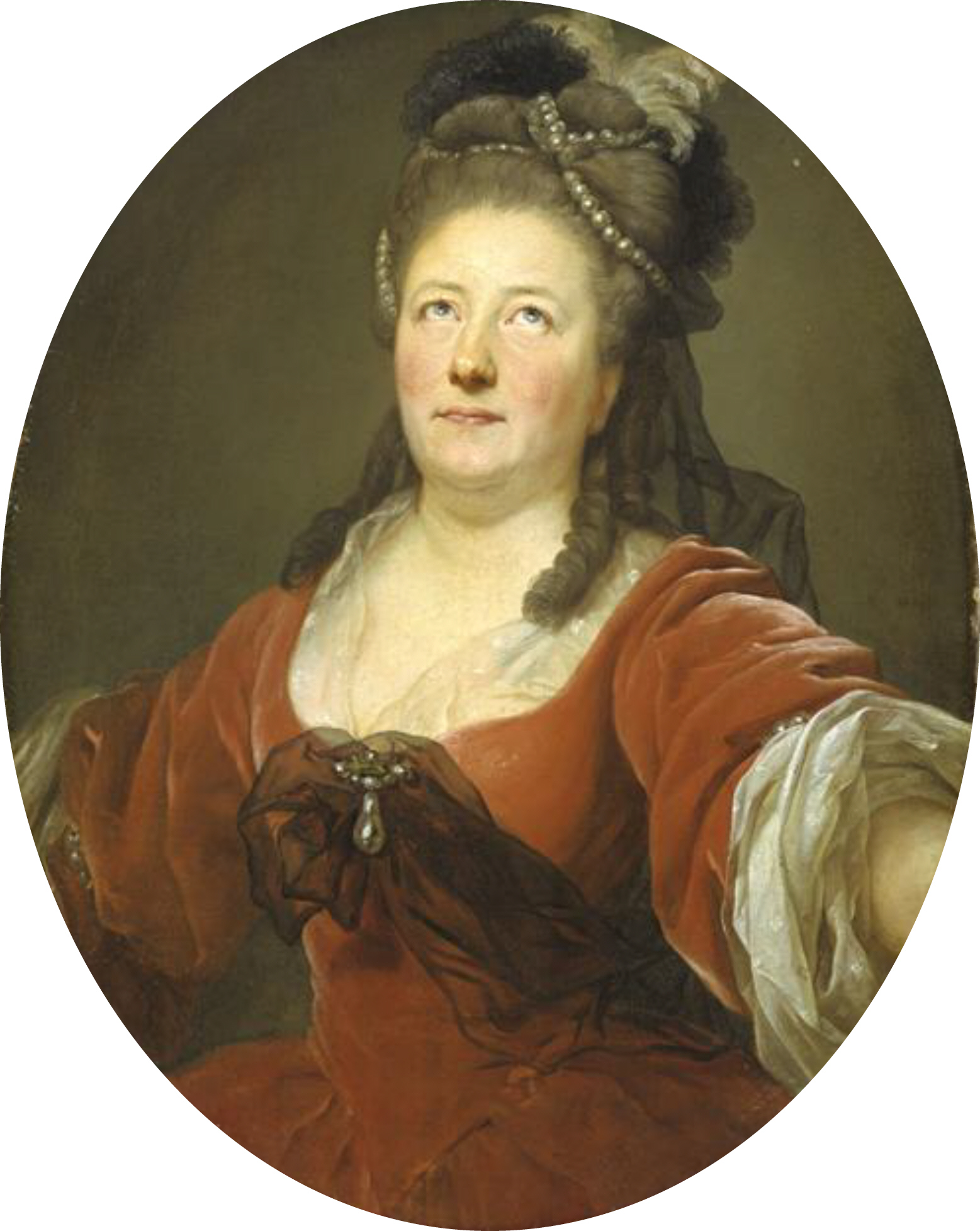
- Friederike Sophie Seyler by Anton Graff, Kunsthalle Hamburg (1775)
- Born: Friederike Sophie Sparmann; 1738; Dresden, Electorate of Saxony, Holy Roman Empire
- Died: 22 November 1789 (aged 50–51); Schleswig, Denmark
- Other names: Friederike Sophie Hensel
- Occupations: Actress and playwright
- Notable work: Die Entführung oder die zärtliche Mutter; Oberon (Huon and Amanda)
- Spouses: Abel Seyler; Johann Gottlieb Hensel

Friederike Sophie Seyler (Note: She was named Friederike Sophie, but was called Sophie. In written works her given name is sometimes rendered Friederike Sophie, sometimes Sophie Friederike, sometimes Sophie and sometimes abbreviated as F.S. She was born Sparmann and was known under her married name from her first marriage, Hensel, from 1755 to 1772. From 1772 she was known under her married name from her second marriage, Seyler, occasionally spelled Seiler. In accordance with the conventions of the era, the last name was sometimes rendered in the feminine, indicated by the ending -in. Hence her last name was sometimes rendered as Henselin and Seylerin/Seilerin, respectively, sometimes with the addition of the definite article in lieu of a given name as die Henselin and die Seylerin.) (1738 – 22 November 1789; née Sparmann, formerly married Hensel) was a German actress, playwright and librettist. Alongside Friederike Caroline Neuber, she was widely considered Germany's greatest actress of the 18th century; Gotthold Ephraim Lessing described her in his Hamburg Dramaturgy as "incontestably one of the best actresses that German theatre has ever seen."

The granddaughter of the architect Matthäus Daniel Pöppelmann, she ran away from an abusive uncle under the threat of a forced marriage to join the theatre at the age of sixteen in 1754. She established herself as one of Germany's leading actresses in the 1760s and was acclaimed for her portrayal of passionate, majestic, tragic heroines. From 1767 she was professionally and personally associated with the theatre director Abel Seyler, whom she married in 1772, as the leading actress of the Hamburg National Theatre and later of the Seyler Theatre Company. With Seyler she led an itinerant life until her death, performing widely across the German-speaking realm. She also stayed for several periods at the Vienna Burgtheater between 1757 and 1772. She was associated with all the leading theatres of her era: Hamburg, Vienna, Weimar, Gotha and Mannheim.

She is regarded as one of the most important female playwrights of the 18th century, and her renown as an actress contributed to the popularity of her plays. Her libretto for the opera Oberon (originally titled Huon and Amanda) was a major inspiration for Emanuel Schikaneder's libretto for Mozart’s opera The Magic Flute; a lightly adapted version of Seyler's opera was the first opera performed by Schikaneder's troupe at their new theatre, the Theater auf der Wieden, and established a tradition within the Schikaneder company of fairy-tale operas that was to culminate two years later in The Magic Flute, which shared several plots, characters, and singers with Seyler's Oberon. Musicologist Thomas Bauman describes Oberon as "an important impulse for the creation of a generation of popular spectacles trading in magic and the exotic. Die Zauberflöte in particular shares many features with Oberon, musical as well as textual."

== Early life ==
She was born as Friederike Sophie Sparmann in Dresden as the only child of the doctor Johann Wilhelm Sparmann and Luise Catharina Pöppelmann; her grandfather was the architect Matthäus Daniel Pöppelmann. She came from a broken home; her parents divorced when she was eleven years old, and her mother joined a convent. At the age of twelve she was sent to live with an abusive maternal uncle, who treated her so badly that she ran away to another relative, who died already in 1753. In order to escape an arranged marriage that her uncle had set up, she ran away from him to join the theatre at the age of sixteen in 1754.

== Theatrical career, 1754–1767 ==
In 1754 she joined the troupe of Harlekin Kirsch. In 1755, aged seventeen, she married a fellow actor, 27-year old Johann Gottlieb Hensel (1728–1787), and at the end of 1755 they both joined the troupe of Franz Schuch in Breslau, where she earned acclaim as an actress. In 1757 they joined Konrad Ernst Ackermann's company in Hamburg. Later in 1757 she went to Vienna to perform at the Burgtheater, despite having signed a one-year contract with Ackermann. From that point she lived apart from her husband, and they later formally divorced. Until 1765 she performed in Vienna, Frankfurt and Hildburghausen. For a time she contemplated giving up acting due to an illness, but she finally returned to the Ackermann company in Hamburg in 1765.

== Hamburg National Theatre, Seyler Theatre Company and marriage to Abel Seyler ==
Abel Seyler, Sophie Seyler's second husband and founder of the Hamburg National Theatre and the Seyler Theatre Company

The year 1767 marked the start of her lifelong professional and personal association with Abel Seyler, who later became her second husband. In that year a group of Hamburg merchants led by Abel Seyler took over the Comödienhaus theatre building from the Ackermann troupe, and founded the Hamburg National Theatre, the first attempt to establish a national theatre in Germany on the basis of Ludvig Holberg's ideas. A fervent admirer of Friederike Sophie Hensel, Abel Seyler was a former banker and "a handsome bon vivant" who had suffered a sensational bankruptcy for an enormous sum in the wake of the Amsterdam banking crisis of 1763, and who would later become one of the great theatre principals of 18th century Europe. It was largely his admiration for Friederike Sophie Hensel, by then 29, that led him to devote himself to theatre from 1767; as a result of her rivalry with 22-year old Karoline Schulze, Friederike Sophie Hensel was at the centre of the intrigue that led her admirer Seyler to "establish a theatre for her, where she could reign undisputed without fearing any rivalry."

Friederike Sophie Hensel was the leading actress of the Hamburg National Theatre, which also employed Konrad Ekhof as its male lead actor and de facto artistic director and Gotthold Ephraim Lessing as a dramaturg. Lessing wrote his influential work on drama and which gave its name to the field of dramaturgy, Hamburg Dramaturgy, as a collection of commentary on the plays; her prominent role within the national theatre is documented by Lessing in the Hamburg Dramaturgy, where Lessing lauded her as one of Germany's finest actresses. The Hamburg National Theatre had to close in 1769 when Abel Seyler's money had run out after two years of lavish spending.

In 1769 Abel Seyler established the travelling Seyler Theatre Company, an effective successor of the national theatre, retaining Konrad Ekhof and Friederike Sophie Hensel as its leading actors. The company established itself as the leading theatre company in German-speaking Europe in the 1770s, and is credited with popularising Shakespeare's plays in German-speaking Europe and with promoting the Sturm und Drang playwrights and a serious German opera tradition. Initially based in Hanover, the company stayed for three years at the court of the arts patron Duchess Anna Amalia in Weimar from 1771 to 1774, coinciding with the infancy of the cultural era known as the Weimar Classicism. Friederike Sophie Hensel performed with the Seyler company from 1769, but stayed at the Vienna Burgtheater from 1771 to 1772. In 1772 she reunited with Seyler, her longtime love interest, and married him in November 1772 in Oßmannstedt just outside Weimar. From 1772 she accompanied Abel Seyler professionally, performing mostly at theatres led by him. After the 1774 Schloss Weimar fire, the Seyler company moved to the ducal court of Gotha, and was based in Leipzig and Dresden from 1775 to 1777. From 1777 to 1779 the Seyler company was primarily based in Frankfurt and Mainz and travelled extensively to Cologne, Hanau, Mannheim, Heidelberg and Bonn.

In 1779 the Seyler company formed the core of the new Mannheim National Theatre, which her husband led as its founding artistic director. At Mannheim her husband directed several Shakespeare productions, and left a lasting legacy, while Friederike Sophie portrayed key Shakespeare roles such as Lady Macbeth. In 1781 her jealousy provoked an unfortunate incident; in response to repeated insolent remarks during theatre rehearsals by her student Elisabeth Toscani, her husband gave Toscani a slap in the face, which led to his retirement from the directorship. The Seyler couple then left Mannheim and stayed in Schleswig from 1781 to 1783, where her husband was artistic director of the Schleswig Court Theatre. From 1785 to 1787 she again performed at the Comödienhaus in Hamburg under the direction of Friedrich Ludwig Schröder, while her husband sometimes worked as a prompter at the theatre. In 1787 she moved with her husband to Schleswig, where he again became director of the Schleswig Court Theatre and where she performed until her death in 1789.

== Artistic legacy ==
Friederike Sophie Seyler was widely regarded as the greatest German actress of her time, and the greatest German actress of the 18th century alongside Friederike Caroline Neuber. She mastered diverse roles, but won particular acclaim for her portrayal of passionate, majestic tragic heroines such as Clytemnestra, Medea and Gertrude in Hamlet. Gotthold Ephraim Lessing described her in his Hamburg Dramaturgy as "incontestably one of the best actresses that German theatre has ever seen." He praised the ease and precision of her declamations, and her subtle acting. He was particularly impressed by how she mastered the death scene as the heroine in his own play Miss Sara Sampson, writing that "one cannot ask more of art than what Madame Hensel does in the role of Sara." Writing about her performance in Françoise de Graffigny's Cénie, Lessing noted that "not a word falls from her mouth to the earth. What she says she did not learn, it comes from her own head, from her own heart. She likes to talk, or she does not like to talk, her play continues uninterruptedly. I only knew one mistake; but it is a very rare mistake; a very enviable mistake. The actress is too great for the role." The actor August Wilhelm Iffland described her as one of his greatest role models.

While she was regarded as Germany's most prominent living actress, she also had a reputation for being unusually conceited and difficult to work with. She felt gravely insulted by the slightest criticism of her acting, even by generally very positive reviews by Lessing; her vanity, career ambition, demand for the most prominent roles and rivalry with other actresses caused tensions throughout her career. Richard E. Schade describes her as "a beautiful, if rather solidly built and domineering leading lady." According to Phyllis Hartnoll, "even Lessing, who detested her, had to admit she was a fine actress. In private life she was malicious and intriguing, her character contributing to the downfall of the Hamburg enterprise."

== As a playwright ==
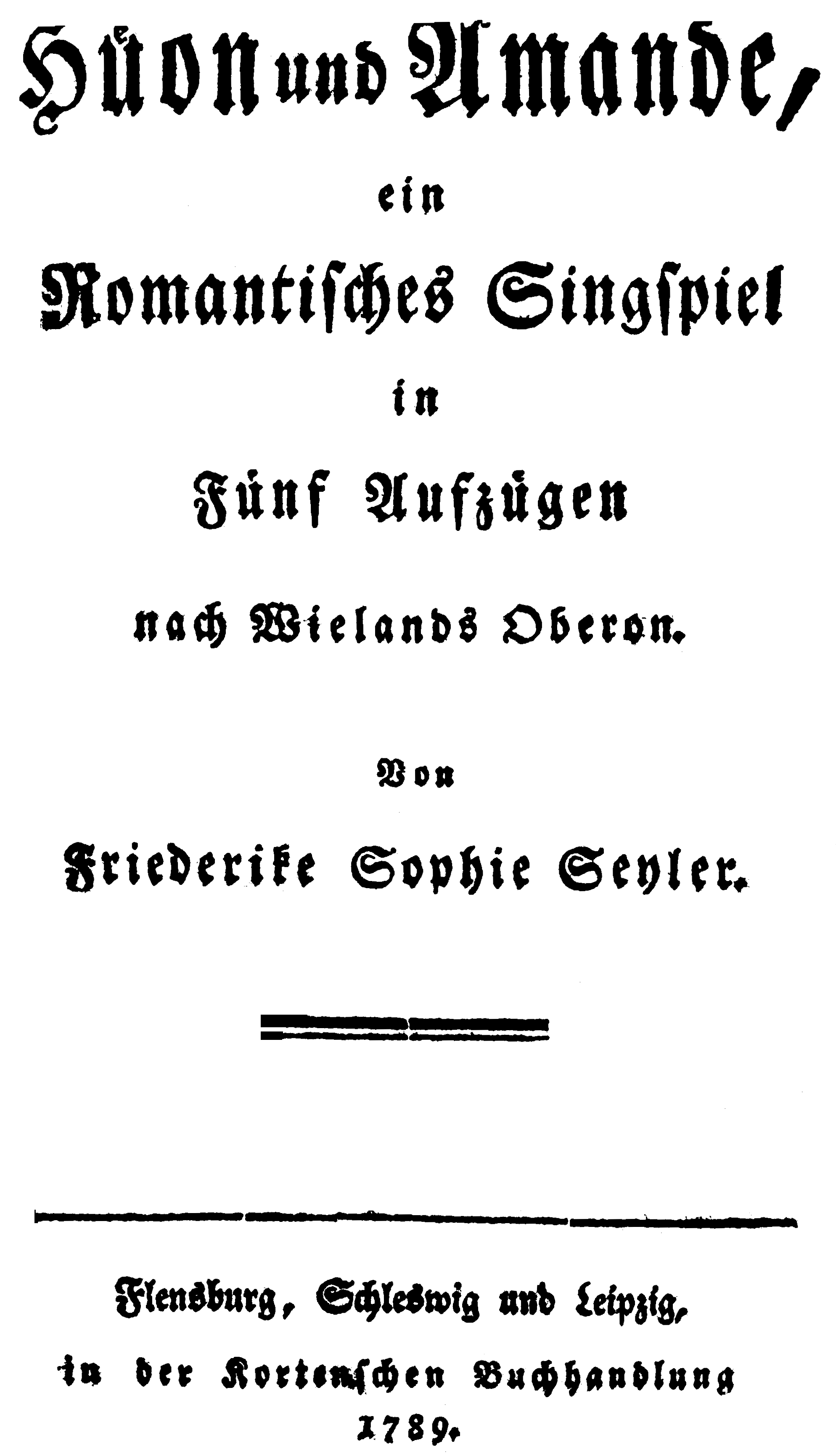
Original cover of Hüon und Amande by Friederike Sophie Seyler (1789)

Friederike Sophie Seyler only wrote two plays; nevertheless she is regarded as one of the most important female playwrights of the 18th century, and she was one of very few female playwrights of her era. In her own lifetime she was better known as an actress than as a playwright. Anne Fleig notes that her prominence as an actress was important for the contemporary influence of her plays. She also translated two plays from French.

=== Die Entführung oder die zärtliche Mutter ===
Her first play was titled Die Familie auf dem Lande and was published in 1770. A revised version of the play was published in 1772 under the title Die Entführung oder die zärtliche Mutter (The Abduction, or The Tender Mother). The play was a dramatic adaptation of the 1767 novel Conclusion of the Memoirs of Miss Sidney Bidulph (1767) by Frances Sheridan, a largely forgotten female novelist, that was a sequel to her earlier novel Memoirs of Miss Sidney Bidulph. The latter novel was itself inspired by Pamela; or, Virtue Rewarded by Samuel Richardson. The play is written in the style of a comédie larmoyante, popular with female playwrights, where a happy ending follows a tragic narrative.

=== Huon and Amanda or Oberon ===
As a playwright Friederike Sophie Seyler is best remembered for the influential romantic Singspiel Huon and Amanda (German: Hüon und Amande), better known as Oberon. Inspired by Wieland's poem Oberon and one of the earliest plays based on a fairy tale, it was published in 1789, the year she died, and was dedicated to her and her husband's long-time friend and collaborator, the actor Friedrich Ludwig Schröder. It was published in a new edition after her death in 1792 under the title Oberon, or The Elf King (German: Oberon oder König der Elfen). The play, with original music by Carl Hanke, became a great success in Hamburg; Hanke had been recruited by her husband as music director at the Comödienhaus in Hamburg in 1783. Her libretto was shortly after re-adapted by Karl Ludwig Giesecke for the theatre company of Emanuel Schikaneder, with new music by Paul Wranitzky. The play was also performed by the Weimar court theater under the direction of Goethe. Seyler's play with Wranitzky's music became the first opera performed by Schikaneder's troupe at the Theater auf der Wieden, and established a tradition within the company of fairy tale operas within the Schikaneder company that was to culminate in Mozart's and Schikaneder's opera The Magic Flute two years later. Oberon as written by Sophie Seyler and built upon by Giesecke is similar to The Magic Flute in its plot and characters, and a number of the singers who participated in the Schikaneder production of Seyler/Wranitzky's Oberon took similar roles in the later opera. According to Peter Branscombe, "it has long been recognized that Giesecke, the named author of Wranitzky's libretto, deserves little credit for what is largely a plagiarism," concluding that "Giesecke's "Oberon, König der Elfen is hardly more than a mild revision of Seyler's book." After the theatrical success of Giesecke's plagiarized version (and also after Seyler's death), Seyler's original was renamed Oberon and performed under this title.

== Plays ==
- Die Familie auf dem Lande, 1770
- Die Entführung oder die zärtliche Mutter, play in five acts, 1772. Wehrhahn Verlag Laatzen (2. ed. 2004). ISBN 3-86525-012-2. A revised version of Die Familie auf dem Lande.
- Huon and Amanda, romantic Singspiel in five acts, 1789; second edition in 1792 under the title Oberon, or The Elf King; original music by Carl Hanke, new music by Paul Wranitzky

== Bibliography ==
- Wilhelm Kosch, "Seyler, Friederike Sophie", in Dictionary of German Biography, eds. Walther Killy and Rudolf Vierhaus, Vol. 9, Walter de Gruyter editor, 2005, ISBN 3110966298, p. 308
- Paul Schlenther: Abel Seyler. In Allgemeine Deutsche Biographie (ADB). Volume 34, Duncker & Humblot, Leipzig 1892, p. 778–782.
- Susanne Kord: "Friederike Sophie Seyler. In Ein Blick hinter die Kulissen: Deutschsprachige Dramatikerinnen im 18. und 19. Jahrhundert (pp. 312–314). Springer-Verlag, 2016
