= Johann Gottlieb Hensel =

German actor (1727–1787)

Johann Gottlieb Hensel (1728–1787) was a German actor. He was associated with some of the leading theatres of the 18th century, such as the Ackermann Company in Hamburg, the Hamburg National Theatre and the Seyler Theatre Company, and was mentioned by Lessing in the Hamburg Dramaturgy and lauded for his portrayal of comic old people and servants. He is however best known as the first husband of the far more prominent actress Friederike Sophie Hensel, later Seyler (née Sparmann), a prominent figure in the history of theatre in the 18th century.

== Career ==
Hensel was born in Hubertusburg. He joined the troupe of Harlekin Kirsch in Lusatia in 1754. In 1755, he married the actress Friederike Sophie Sparmann, and they both joined the troupe of Franz Schuch in Breslau at the end of the year. In 1757, they joined Konrad Ernst Ackermann's company in Hamburg. They lived apart from the end of 1757, when his wife went to Vienna, and later divorced. Friederike Sophie would later marry the famous theatre director Abel Seyler.

In 1758, Johann Gottlieb Hensel joined the Kirchhoff Company. In 1764, he had rejoined the Ackermann Company. In 1767, he was one of the members of the Hamburg National Theatre led by Abel Seyler; he was mentioned by Lessing in the Hamburg Dramaturgy and lauded for his portrayal of comic old people and servants. At the end of 1767, he joined Karl Theophil Döbbelin's company. In 1769, he joined the Seyler Theatre Company; finally, he joined the company of Joseph Voltolini, and stayed with Voltolini until his death.

Uncharacteristic for a protestant, his funeral was carried out in a most festive way with the participation from Catholic clergy as well as actors and academics.

In the history of theatre Hensel is best known as the first husband of the actress Friederike Sophie Hensel, later Seyler, the leading German actress in the second half of the 18th century.
