= Oberon =

King of the fairies in medieval, Renaissance literature

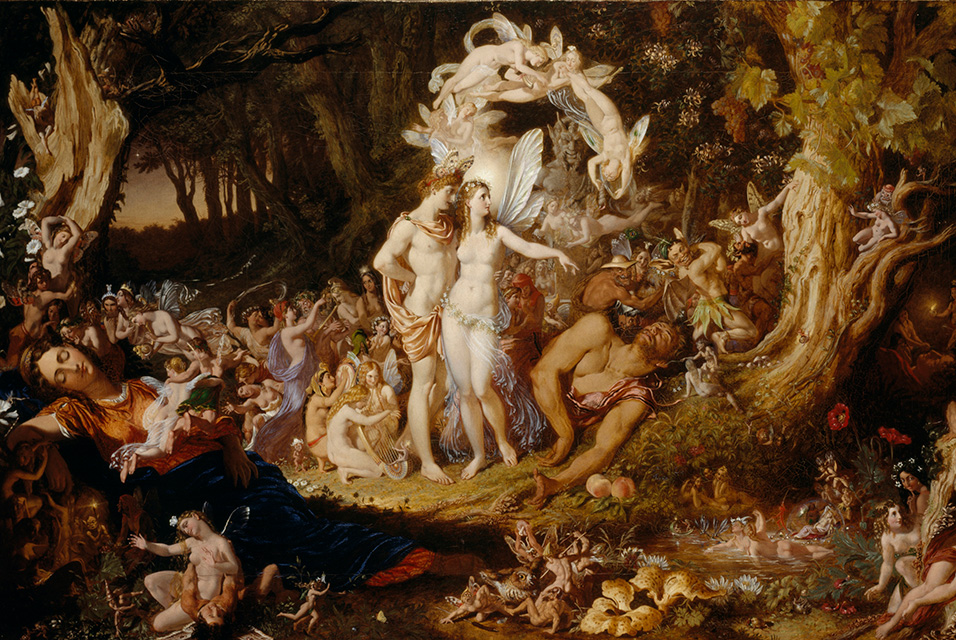
The Reconciliation of Titania and Oberon by Joseph Noel Paton

Oberon (/ˈoʊbərɒn/) is a king of the fairies in medieval and Renaissance literature. He is a character in William Shakespeare's play A Midsummer Night's Dream, in which he is spouse of Titania, Queen of the Fairies.

== Etymology ==
Oberon is a variant spelling of Auberon, earlier Alberon, the origin of which is uncertain, though it may be connected with Alberich and Aubrey, or might else be derived from the Old High German elements adal 'noble' + ber(n) 'bear'. In the case of the former, the German dwarf Alberich may have been romantasised when tales of him reached France and England, his German ich being changed to a French on.

== French heroic song ==
Oberon is first attested as the name of a fairy king in the early 13th century chanson de geste entitled Les Prouesses et faitz du noble Huon de Bordeaux, wherein the eponymous hero encounters King Oberon of the fairies as he passes through a forest. Huon is forewarned by a hermit not to speak to Oberon, but his courtesy causes him to answer the fairy king's greetings and so wins his friendship and aid.

The fairy king is dwarfish in height, though very handsome. He explains that, at his birth, an offended fairy cursed him not to grow past three years of age (one of the earliest examples of the wicked fairy godmother folklore motif) but relented and gave him great beauty as compensation. In this story, he is said to be the child of Morgan le Fay and Julius Caesar.

A manuscript of the romance in the city of Turin contains a prologue to the story of Huon de Bordeaux in the shape of a separate romance of Auberon and four sequels and there are later French versions as well.

He is given some Celtic trappings, such as a magical cup (similar to the Holy Grail or the cornucopia) that is ever full. "The magic cup supplied their evening meal; for such was its virtue that it afforded not only wine, but more solid fare when desired", according to Thomas Bulfinch.

Shakespeare saw or heard of the French heroic song through the c. 1540 translation by John Bourchier, Lord Berners, called Huon of Burdeuxe. In Philip Henslowe's diary, there is a note of a performance of a play Hewen of Burdoche on 28 December 1593.

== A Midsummer Night's Dream ==
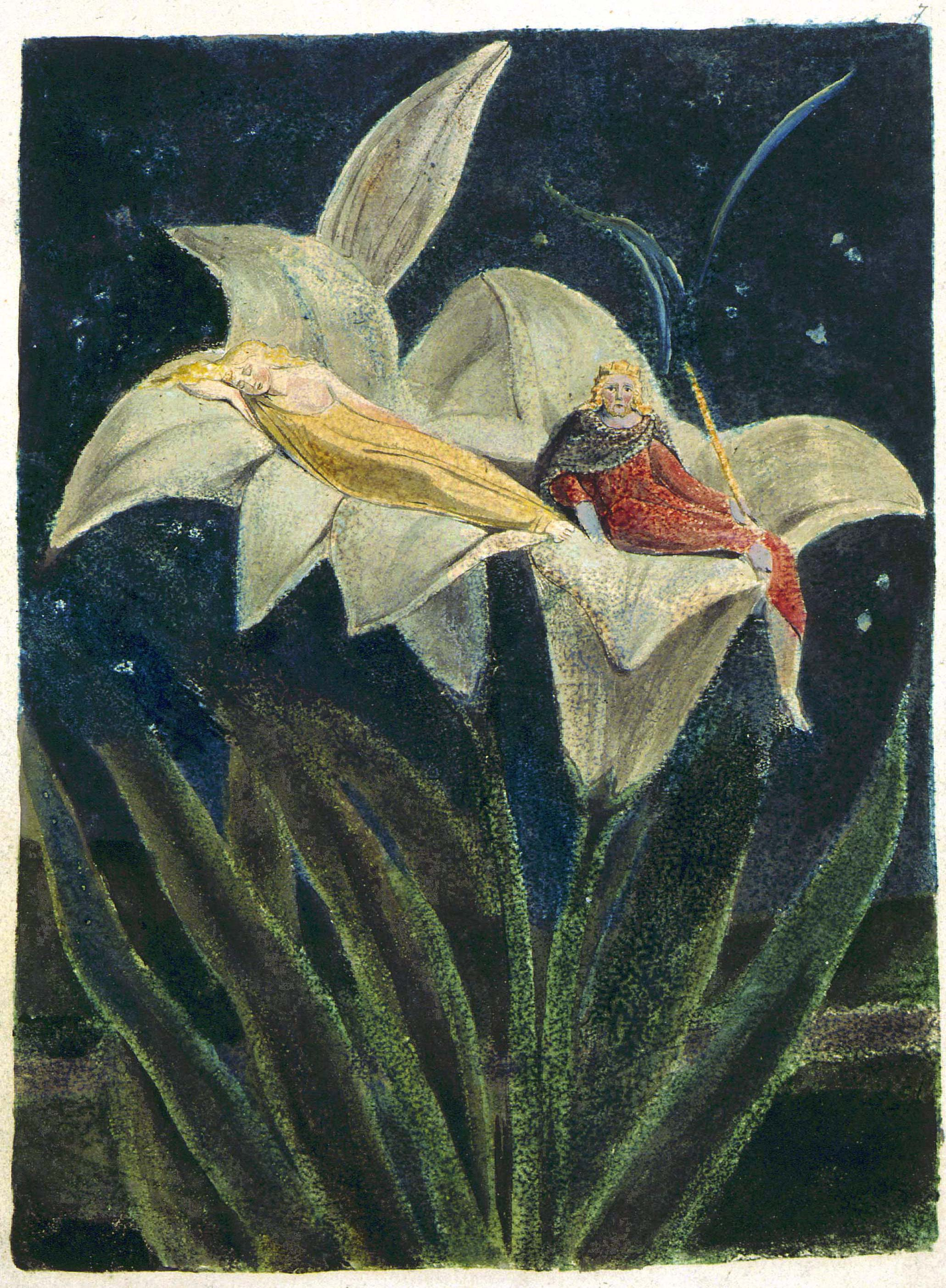
One of William Blake's illustrations to his The Song of Los. Scholars have traditionally identified the figures as Titania and Oberon, though not all new scholarship does. This copy, currently held by the Library of Congress, was printed and painted in 1795.

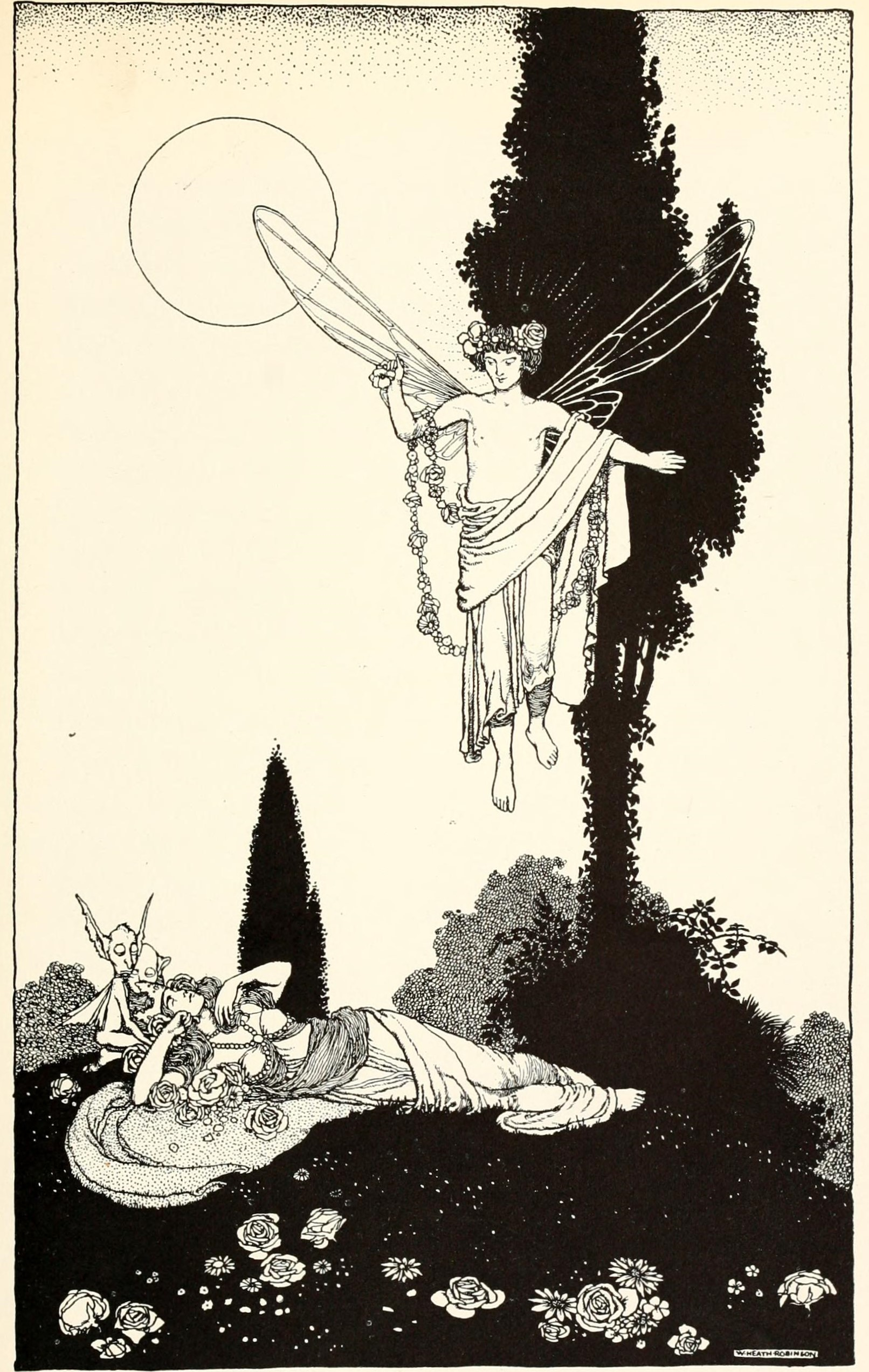
Illustration of Oberon enchanting Titania by W. Heath Robinson, 1914

In William Shakespeare's A Midsummer Night's Dream, written in 1595/96, Oberon is the king of all of the fairies and is engaged in a dispute with his wife, Titania, the fairy queen. They are arguing over custody of a child whom Oberon wants to raise to be his henchman. Titania wants to keep and raise the child for the sake of her mortal friend and follower who died giving birth to him.

Because Oberon and Titania are both powerful spirits connected to nature, their feuding disrupts the weather. Titania describes the consequences of their fighting:

Therefore the winds, piping to us in vain,
As in revenge, have suck'd up from the sea
Contagious fogs; which falling in the land
Have every pelting river made so proud
That they have overborne their continents:
The ox hath therefore stretch'd his yoke in vain,
The ploughman lost his sweat, and the green corn
Hath rotted ere his youth attain'd a beard;
The fold stands empty in the drowned field,
And crows are fatted with the murrion flock;
The nine men's morris is fill'd up with mud,
And the quaint mazes in the wanton green
For lack of tread are undistinguishable:
The human mortals want their winter here;
No night is now with hymn or carol blest:
Therefore the moon, the governess of floods,
Pale in her anger, washes all the air,
That rheumatic diseases do abound:
And thorough this distemperature we see
The seasons alter: hoary-headed frosts
Far in the fresh lap of the crimson rose,
And on old Hiems' thin and icy crown
An odorous chaplet of sweet summer buds
Is, as in mockery, set: the spring, the summer,
The childing autumn, angry winter, change
Their wonted liveries, and the mazed world,
By their increase, now knows not which is which:
And this same progeny of evils comes
From our debate, from our dissension;
We are their parents and original.

— A Midsummer Night's Dream, Act 2, Scene 1

Oberon tricks Titania into giving him back the child using the juice from a special flower that makes one "madly dote upon the next live thing that it sees". The flower was accidentally struck by Cupid's arrow when he attempted to shoot a young maiden in a field, which infuses the flower with love. Oberon sends his servant, Puck, to fetch the flower, which he does successfully.

Furious that Titania will not give him the child, Oberon puts juice from the magical flower in her eyes while she is asleep, the effect of which will cause Titania to fall in love with the first living thing she sees upon awakening. Titania awakens and finds herself madly in love with Bottom, an actor from the rude mechanicals whose head was just transformed into that of a donkey, thanks to a curse from Puck.

Meanwhile, two couples have entered the forest: lovers Hermia and Lysander are pursued by Demetrius, who also loves Hermia, and Helena, who loves Demetrius. Oberon witnesses Demetrius rejecting Helena, admires her amorous determination, and decides to help her. He sends Puck to put some of the juice in Demetrius's eyes, describing him as "a youth in Athenian clothing", to make him fall in love with Helena. Puck finds Lysander, who is also a youth wearing Athenian clothing, and puts the love potion on Lysander's eyes. When Lysander wakes, he sees Helena first and falls in love with her.

Meanwhile, Demetrius has also been anointed with the flower and awakes to see Helena, pursued by Lysander, and a fight breaks out between the two young men. Oberon is furious with Puck and casts a sleeping spell on the forest, making Puck reverse the potion on Lysander, admonishing Puck to not reverse the effects on Demetrius. Both couples awake and begin the journey back to Athens.

Oberon now looks upon Titania and her lover, Bottom, and feels sorry for what he has done. He reverses the spell using a magic herb. When she wakes, she is confused and thinks that she had a dream. Oberon explains that the dream was real, and the two reunite happily. They then return to Athens in the epilogue to bless the couples and become once again the benevolent fairy king and queen.

== Other historical and cultural references ==
- Oberon is a character in The Scottish History of James IV, a play written c. 1590 by Robert Greene.
- In 1610, Ben Jonson wrote a masque of Oberon, the Faery Prince. It was performed by Henry Frederick Stuart, the Prince of Wales, at the English court on New Year's Day, 1611.
- Oberon is a main character in Michael Drayton's narrative poem Nimphidia (1627) about the fairy Pigwiggin's love for Queen Mab and the jealousy of King Oberon.
- In the anonymous book Robin Goodfellow, His Mad Pranks and Merry Jests (1628) Oberon is known as "Obreon" and is the father of the half-fairy Robin Goodfellow by a human woman.
- Christoph Martin Wieland first published his epic poem Oberon in 1780; it in turn became the basis (as indicated on the title page) for the German opera Huon and Amanda (Hüon und Amande in German), later known as Oberon, by Sophie Seyler. A plagiarized version of Seyler's opera called Oberon by Karl Ludwig Giesecke with music by Paul Wranitzky debuted in Vienna shortly afterwards. Both operas enjoyed popularity. After extensive performances of the Giesecke version at the coronation of Leopold II in Frankfurt in 1791, it was much performed in Europe until it was surpassed in popularity by Weber's opera Oberon.
- Oberon and Titania are main characters in the 1789 Danish opera Holger Danske, with music by F.L.Æ. Kunzen and libretto by Jens Baggesen.
- Johann Wolfgang Goethe included the figures from Shakespeare's work in Faust I. Oberon is married to Titania, and the couple are celebrating their golden wedding anniversary in Faust I.
- In the first chapter of Sir Walter Scott's 1819 epic novel Ivanhoe the fool Wamba suggests that a passing procession of dignitaries "are come from Fairy-land with a message from King Oberon".
- In 1826, Carl Maria von Weber's opera, Oberon, (written after a poem by Christoph Martin Wieland translated to an English libretto by James Robinson Planche) debuted at Covent Garden in London, England.
- Oberon appears with Titania in Richard Dadd's unfinished painting, The Fairy Feller's Master-Stroke, displayed in the Tate Museum.
- Two main characters in John Crowley’s Little, Big, a 1981 multi-generational novel about a family’s interaction with the fae, are named Auberon.

A fanciful etymology was given for the name Oberon by Charles Mackay in his book The Gaelic Etymology of the Languages of Western Europe along with many other theories on words found in the English language that have not found mainstream acceptance.

== In popular culture ==
- In 1830, botanist John Lindley named a flowering plant in the family Orchidaceae, Oberonia after the fairy king.
- In 1941, herpetologists Hobart Muir Smith and Bryce Cardigan Brown named a species of Mexican lizard Sceloporus oberon, alluding to the fairy king.
- In the manga and anime The Ancient Magus' Bride, which aired from October 2017 to March 2018, the King of the Fairies is named Oberon and his wife, the Queen of the Fairies, is named Titania.
- In the videogame franchise Shin Megami Tensei, Oberon is one of the demons the player can summon during the game.
- In the videogame Warframe, Oberon was added as a playable character in the 11.5 Update The Cicero Crisis
- In the gacha videogame Fate/Grand Order, Oberon is a playable character and the main antagonist of the chapter "Avalon Le Fae".
- In the Gargoyles television series, Oberon is portrayed as the blue-skinned elven king of Avalon, a powerful source of magic in the world.
- Oberon is mentioned alongside Titania in the 1975 song "The Fairy Feller's Master Stroke" by the band Queen.

== See Also ==
- Titania—Oberon’s wife and the queen of the faeries.
- Alberich—A dwarf king in German folklore, possibly the origin of Oberon’s name.
- Erlking—A ghostly forest spirit who torments travellers.
- Puck—Oberon’s mischievous faery assistant.
- Robin Goodfellow—A tricksy imp in English folklore, also called Puck.
