= Elisabeth Toscani =

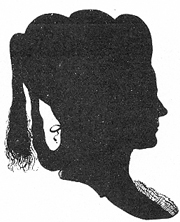
Elisabeth Toscani

Anna Elisabeth Toscani (born 1761, died 1799), née Endemann, was a German actress. She was a student of Friederike Sophie Seyler and was one of the leading actresses of the Mannheim National Theatre from 1779 to 1784. She is also notable for being the first "Amalia" in the original performance of Friedrich Schiller's The Robbers on 13 January 1782 at Mannheim.

She worked under the direction of F.S. Seyler's husband Abel Seyler at the Mannheim National Theatre until 1781, when a quarrel between her and the director led to his retirement. She was described as a "scheming" character; although Friederike Sophie Seyler was also regarded as a very difficult person to work with.

She was married to Giovanni Federico (also known as Johann Friedrich) Toscani, a noted tenor born in Warsaw in the 1750s to an Italian family. Her husband had joined Abel Seyler's travelling company, the Seyler Theatre Company, in 1775.
