= Konrad Ekhof =

German actor (1720–1778)

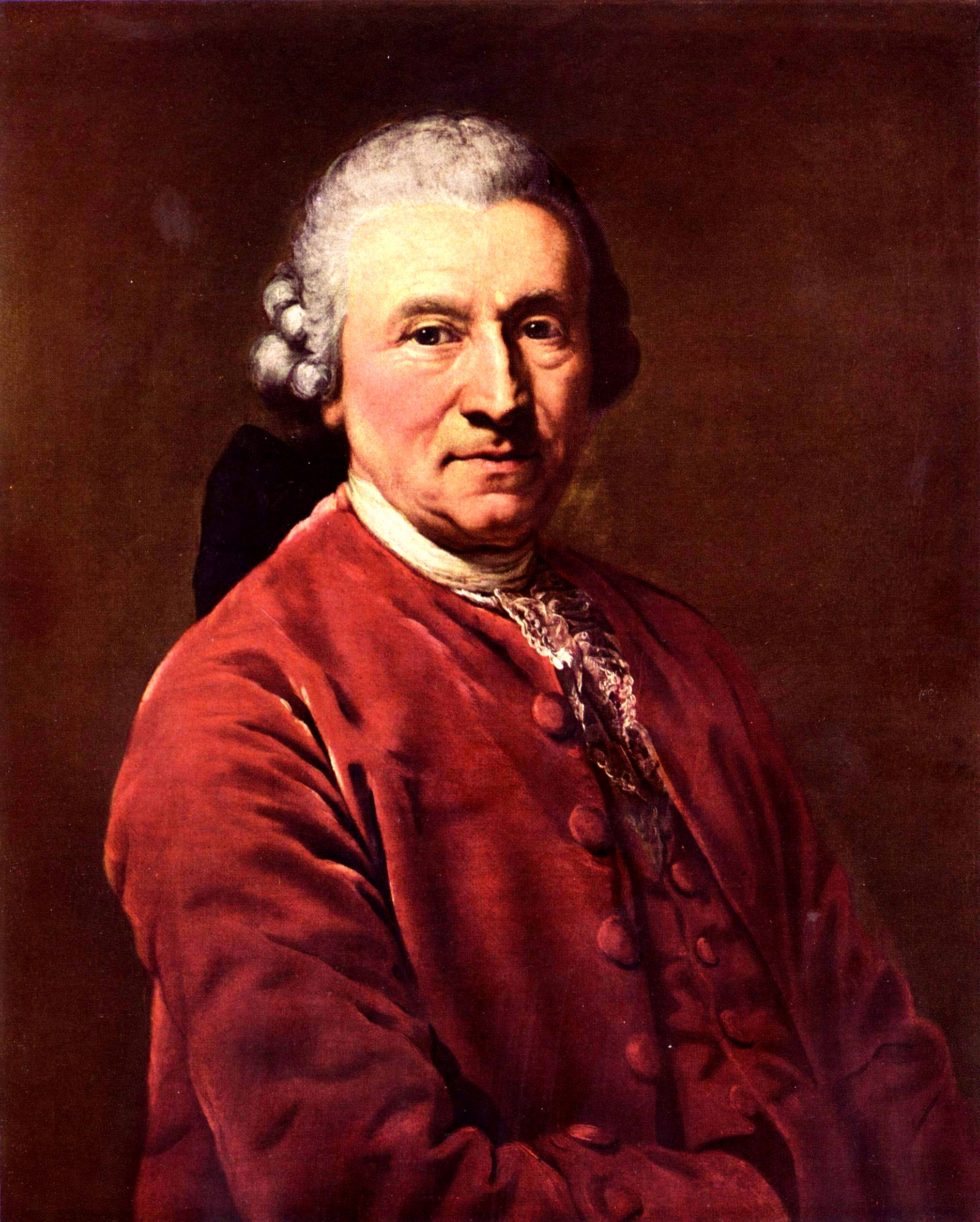
- Born: 12 August 1720; Hamburg, Holy Roman Empire
- Died: 16 June 1778 (aged 57)
- Occupation: actor
- Writing career
- Language: German

Konrad Ekhof (12 August 1720 in Hamburg, Germany – 16 June 1778) was a German actor, often regarded as the foremost actor of German-speaking Europe in the 18th century. He was noted for his collaboration with the theatre principal Abel Seyler in the 1760s and 1770s, first at the Hamburg National Theatre and then at the travelling Seyler Theatre Company.

== Life ==
In 1739, he became a member of Johann Friedrich Schönemann's (1704–1782) company in Lüneburg, and made his first appearance there on 15 January 1740 as Xiphares in Racine's Mithridate. From 1751, the Schönemann company performed mainly in Hamburg and at Schwerin, where Christian Ludwig II of Mecklenburg-Schwerin made them comedians to the court.

During this period Ekhof founded a theatrical academy, which, though short-lived, was of great importance in helping to raise the standard of German acting and the status of German actors. In 1757, Ekhof left Schönemann to join Franz Schuch's company in Danzig, but he soon returned to Hamburg, where, in conjunction with two other actors, he succeeded Schönemann in the direction of the company. He resigned this position, however, in favor of H. G. Koch, with whom he acted until 1764, when he joined K. E. Ackermann's company. In 1767, the Hamburg National Theatre or the Hamburgische Entreprise was founded, backed by Abel Seyler and a group of merchants, and was made famous by Lessing's Hamburgische Dramaturgie. Ekhof was the leading member of the company. After the failure of the enterprise Ekhof was persuaded to join its successor, the travelling Seyler Theatre Company, and performed at the court in Weimar with the Seyler company for some time. He ultimately became co-director of the new court theatre at Gotha, which was later called Ekhof-Theater to honour him. This, the first permanently established theatre in Germany, was opened to the public, not only court members, on 2 October 1775. Ekhof's reputation was now at its height; Goethe called him the only German tragic actor; and in 1777 he acted with Goethe and Duke Charles Augustus at a private performance at Weimar, dining afterward with the poet at the ducal table.

His versatility may be judged from the fact that in the comedies of Goldoni and Molière he was no less successful than in the tragedies of Lessing and Shakespeare. He was regarded by his contemporaries as an unsurpassed exponent of naturalness on the stage; and in this respect he has been not unfairly compared with Garrick. His fame, however, was rapidly eclipsed by that of Friedrich Schröder. His literary efforts were chiefly confined to translations from French authors.
