= Carl Hanke =

German composer

Johann Carl Hanke (c.1749 - 10 June 1803) was a German composer and conductor.

== Life ==
He was baptised at Markt Roßwald on 5 December 1749, son of Anton (a citizen of that village) and Maria Magdalena. The Hanke family was frequently mentioned in the Silesian-Moravian border region and several of its members worked as organists and cantors. No documents survive on Johann Carl's childhood or youth, though count Albert Joseph von Hoditz gave him a place in the children's orchestra at the Schloss Roßwald and so it can be assumed he first took violin lessons at an early age. Famous opera and theatre productions took place at the Schloss around that time, often conducted by Carl Ditters von Dittersdorf.

Frederick the Great visited the Schloss in 1770 and Hanke wrote a cantata in his honour. The count paid for him to travel to Vienna, where he studied under Johann Gottlieb Graun and in 1772-1775 under Christoph Willibald Gluck and where he also decided to become a professional musician. From 1776 to 1778 Hanke led the court musicians and choir back in Roßwald, where he also completed several ballets, orchestral and chamber works, and cantatas for special occasions.

In Roßwald in 1778 he married Anna Maria Stormke (1760-?), with whom he had one child, a daughter. Anna Maria's father Franz Joseph Stormke was a steward and had married Anna Rosina (née Just), also in Roßwald. 1778 also saw the count's death and the dissolution of his court orchestra and choir. The following year Hanke was appointed musical director to the Brünner Stadttheater, which also took on his wife.

In 1781 the couple moved to the National Theatre, Warsaw, whose musicians and actors were almost entirely Polish - Hanke achieving a role there as a non-Pole shows how widely he was respected at the time. In Warsaw his singspiel 'Robert und Hannchen' premiered to great acclaim - king Stanislaus II. August Poniatowski gave him a personal award. However, no documents survive showing the precise dates when Hanke put on his productions in Warsaw, though that theatre went bankrupt in 1782.

== Works ==
Hanke was an exceptionally versatile and flexible composer. He successfully managed the diverse demands resulting from his numerous changes of location and responsibilities. His well-known stage works were simple, clear, and expressive. He was influenced by Gluck and the Leipzig tradition of singspiel. His songs are in a style reminiscent of that of Johann Abraham Peter Schulz. His Symphony in E-flat major has a slow introduction and is reminiscent of Wolfgang Amadeus Mozart's works. His "Serenade" in F major was probably inspired by Dittersdorf.

- Robert und Hannchen or Die hat der Teufel geholt (originally Der Wunsch mancher Mädchen) (libretto by Karl Martin Plümicke), comic two-act singspiel, Warsaw 1781
- Gesänge und Chöre zum lustigen Tag or Die Hochzeit des Figaro, Hamburg 1785
- Xaphire (libretto by Bernhard Christoph d’Arien), large-scale romantic opera, Hamburg 1786
- Dr. Fausts Leibgürtel (libretto by Bernhard Christoph d'Arien after Rousseau and Mylius), two-act comic opera, ca. 1786; Flensburg 1794
- Hüon und Amande (libretto by Friederike Sophie Seyler after Wieland's Oberon), romantic opera, Schleswig 1789/1790

== Bibliography (in German) ==
- Cornelius Kellner: 'Hanke, Carl'. In: Ludwig Finscher (ed.): Die Musik in Geschichte und Gegenwart., second edition, Personenteil, Vol. 8 (Gribenski – Hilverding). Bärenreiter/Metzler, Kassel etc. 2002, ISBN 3-7618-1118-7
  - "List of his works based on the MGG".
- Cornelius Kellner: Hanke, Carl. in: Biographisches Lexikon für Schleswig-Holstein und Lübeck. Wachholtz, Neumünster 1982–2011. Bd. 12 – 2006. ISBN 3-529-02560-7, Seite 159–162.
