= Karoline Schulze-Kummerfeld =

German actor

Karoline Schulze or Schulze-Kummerfeld (30 September 1742 (Note: Karolina herself gave her birth year as 1745) - 20 April 1815) was a German actor.

== Life ==
Born in Vienna, Karoline was also baptised there on 1 October 1742 as Catharina Carolina Paulina. She was a daughter of Christian Schulze (8 November 1693 in Frankfurt (Oder) – 1757 in Freiberg) and his second wife, who he had married on 7 December 1741. Husband and wife were both actors and Karoline first appeared onstage aged three. After losing an engagement in Vienna, her father moved to Munich, Erlangen and Fürth, founded his own acting troupe and toured with it to Erlangen and Ingolstadt. This proved unsuccessful and he took on odd jobs on the side such as painter, acting coach and silhouette cutter while his wife was paid for her sewing.

After losing their own company the couple took on engagements with other troupes, acting in Passau, Regensburg and Nürnberg under Johann Schulz, Luxemburg under Mayer, Würzburg, Eichstätt and Rothenburg under Brunian, unter Kolin and Regensburg from 1754 onwards under Joseph Felix von Kurz, Prague under Locatelli, and Braunschweig under Filippo Nicolini. In 1756 Franz Schuch took them on and he gave Karoline her first major role as a young lover in Magdeburg, Potsdam, Stettin and Frankfurt/Oder. Under his direction she widened her repertoire before the family mvoed to Freiberg, where Christian died. Karoline and her mother asked Döbbelin for a job and performed with him in Erfurt, Mainz, Köln and Düsseldorf.

Mother and daughter were both taken on by Konrad Ernst Ackermann in 1758 and performed in his company in Bern, Luzern, Straßburg, Colmar, Freiburg, Karlsruhe, Mainz, Kassel, Braunschweig, Hannover, Göttingen and finally Hamburg, where her mother died - by the time of the death Karoline had moved home over fifty times. Hamburg was also where Karoline first gained lasting fame for her acting, specifically in tragic roles such as the title role in Lessing's Miss Sara Sampson. The famous actress Friederike Sophie Seyler feared the unknown newcomer and - by founding the Hamburger Nationaltheater - began an intrigue against her which led to Ackermann's company splitting and Schulze losing her position.

In 1767 Schulze instead joined Koch's theatre troupe in Leipzig. There she also caught the young Goethe's eye - in his last years he recalled the Demoiselle Schulze as "not tall, but nice, with beautiful black eyes and hair; her movements and delivery were perhaps too sharp, but were softened by the grace of youth". However, it was also in Leipzig that she retired from the stage and on 24 February 1768 married a man with the surname Kummerfeld, a bank clerk from Hamburg - the marriage gained her citizen rights in Hamburg which were otherwise closed to actresses.

She became destitute due to her husband's death and returned to the stage in July 1777 in Hamburg before touring to Gotha, Mannheim, Innsbruck and Linz. In 1784 she was part of Joseph Bellomo's acting troupe in Weimar but the following year definitively left the stage and founded a sewing school in the city. She wrote her memoirs between 1792 and 1795 and before her death (also in Weimar) gave the city's pharmacy her recipe for 'Kummerfeld’sche Waschwasser' (Kummerfeld's Washing Water).

== Works ==
Claudia Ulbrich (a historian at the Gender Studies Department at the Friedrich-Meinecke-Institut in FU Berlin) is working on a complete edition of Schulze's works:

- (in German) Karoline Kummerfeld: Sämtliche Schriften. Volume 1: Die Selbstzeugnisse (1782 and 1793). edited by Claudia Ulbrich and Gudrun Emberger, in collaboration with Marc Jarzebowski. Köln 2021 (Selbstzeugnisse der Neuzeit, 27,1–2). ISBN 978-3-412-51939-1 (Full text on Open Access).

== Bibliography (in German) ==
- Joseph Kürschner (1883). "Kummerfeld, Karoline" . Allgemeine Deutsche Biographie (in German). Vol. 17. Leipzig: Duncker & Humblot. pp. 372–374.
- Cornelia Naumann: Karoline – ein fahrendes Frauenzimmer. Schauspiel UA Münster 1995, Litag Theaterverlag München.
