= Memoirs of Miss Sidney Bidulph =

1761 novel

- Author: Frances Sheridan
- Language: English
- Genre: Epistolary, Sentimental
- Publication date: 1761
- Publication place: Ireland
- Media type: Print

Memoirs of Miss Sidney Bidulph is a 1761 novel by the Irish writer Frances Sheridan, published in three volumes. A sentimental novel, it was strongly influenced by Samuel Richardson's 1748 novel Clarissa. Sheridan became acquainted with Richardson through her husband Thomas Sheridan's acting, and handed him the manuscript. Richardson was impressed and arranged for the book's publication. Like Clarissa it takes the form of an epistolary novel, in these case featuring its heroine's supposed memoirs. Sheridan was working on the a sequel to the story at her death in 1766, and a fourth volume known as the Conclusion of the Memoirs of Miss Sidney Bidulph was published posthumously in 1767. It inspired the 1772 play Die Entführung oder die zärtliche Mutter by German actress and playwright Friederike Sophie Seyler.

== Bibliography ==
- Kelly, Linda. Richard Brinsley Sheridan. Faber and Faber, 2012.
- Rivero, Albert J (ed.) The Sentimental Novel in the Eighteenth Century. Cambridge University Press, 2019.
- Turner, Chery. Living by the Pen: Women Writers in the Eighteenth Century. Psychology Press, 1992.
