= Oberon (Seyler) =

Singspiel by Friederike Sophie Seyler

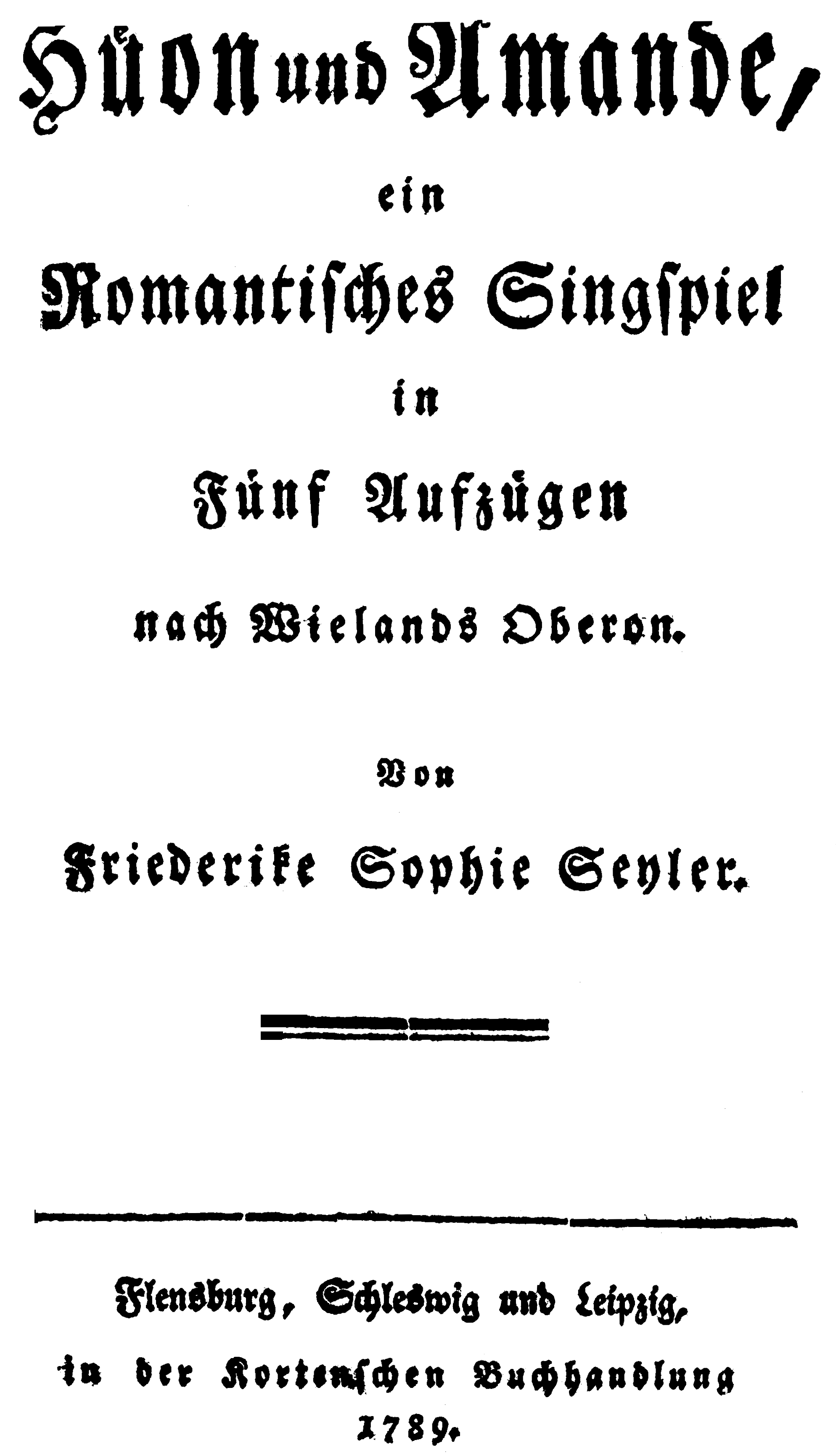
Original cover of Hüon und Amande from 1789, that reads "Huon and Amanda: A Romantic Singspiel in Five Acts after Wieland's Oberon. By Friederike Sophie Seyler."

Oberon, or The Elf King (German: Oberon oder König der Elfen), or simply Oberon, originally known as Huon and Amanda (German: Hüon und Amande), is a romantic Singspiel in five acts by Friederike Sophie Seyler, inspired by the poem Oberon by Christoph Martin Wieland, which itself was based on the epic romance Huon of Bordeaux, a French medieval tale. It has been named for two of its central characters, the knight Huon and the fairy king Oberon, respectively. Musicologist Thomas Bauman describes the work as "an important impulse for the creation of a generation of popular spectacles trading in magic and the exotic. Die Zauberflöte [The Magic Flute] in particular shares many features with Oberon, musical as well as textual."

The opera was published in "Flensburg, Schleswig and Leipzig" in 1789, the year Seyler died. Seyler was married to the prominent theatre director Abel Seyler, the founder of the Seyler Theatre Company and a noted promoter of both German opera and William Shakespeare. The opera was dedicated to their common long-time friend and collaborator, the actor Friedrich Ludwig Schröder. Seyler's opera and a plagiarized version by Karl Ludwig Giesecke both enjoyed popularity from the late 18th century. The opera had a central role in the development of Emanuel Schikaneder's theatre and its focus on fairy tale operas which culminated in The Magic Flute, and was one of the influences that the latter's libretto built upon.

== The Giesecke version and its influence on The Magic Flute ==
Seyler's libretto formed the basis of Karl Ludwig Giesecke's libretto for the opera Oberon, written for Emanuel Schikaneder's troupe and set to music by Paul Wranitzky. The play was also performed by the Weimar court theater under the direction of Goethe. As Giesecke did not credit her, he later came under much criticism for plagiarism, although it soon became evident that his work was based on Seyler's libretto. The opera The Magic Flute, with a libretto by Schikaneder, was to a significant degree based on Giesecke's version of Oberon and thus ultimately on Seyler.

According to Peter Branscombe, "it has long been recognized that Giesecke, the named author of Wranitzky's libretto, deserves little credit for what is largely a plagiarism," concluding that "Giesecke's "Oberon, König der Elfen is hardly more than a mild revision of Seyler's book." After the theatrical success of Giesecke's plagiarized version (and also after Seyler's death), Seyler's original was renamed Oberon and performed under this title. Giesecke's version of Seyler's Oberon was the first opera performed by Schikaneder's troupe at their new theater, and established a tradition within the company of fairy tale operas that was to culminate in The Magic Flute two years later.

== Gallery ==
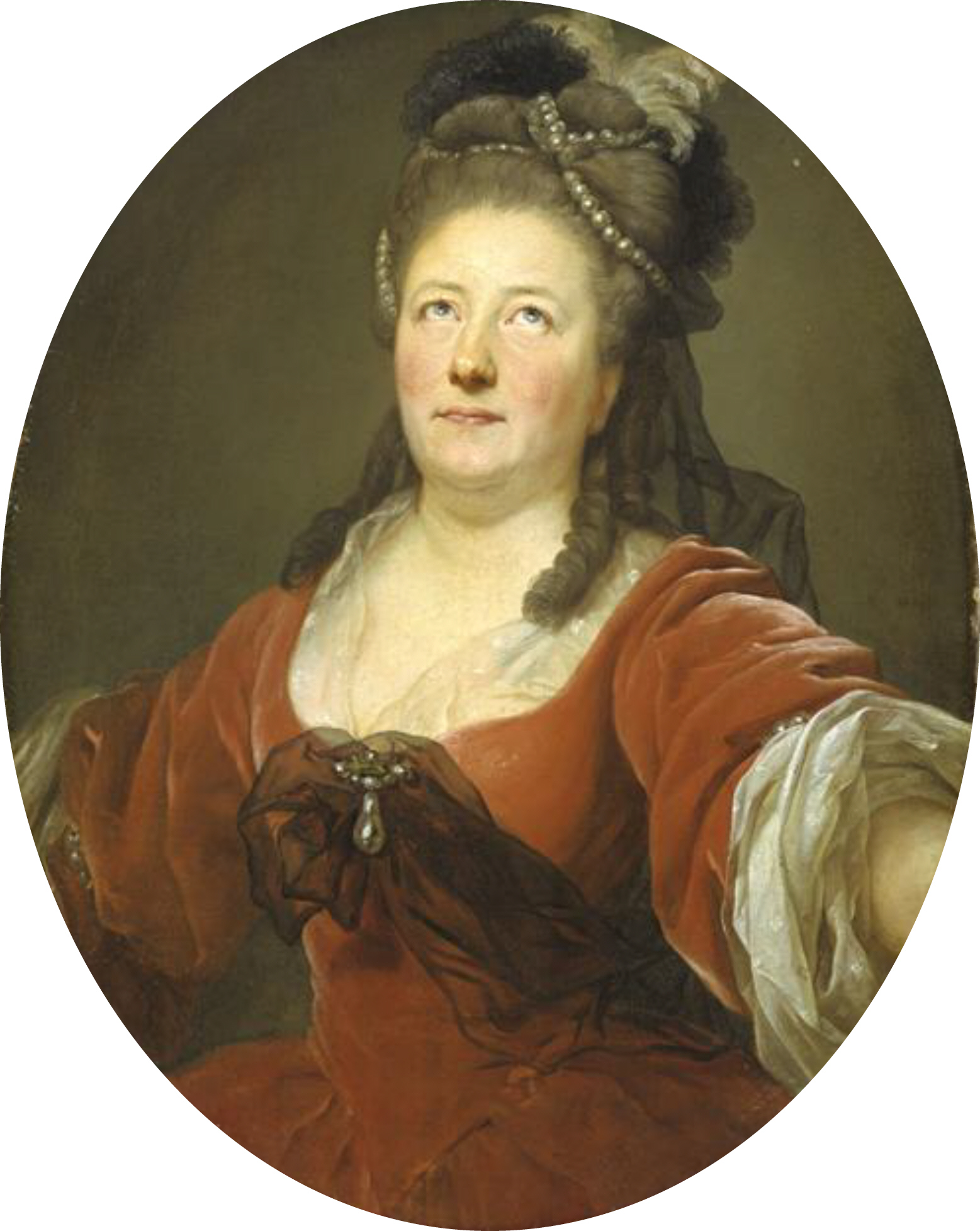
Friederike Sophie Seyler, author of Huon and Amanda, also known as Oberon, painted by Anton Graff

Seyler's husband Abel Seyler, the famous theatre director
