= Friederike Caroline Neuber =

German playwright and writer (1697–1760)

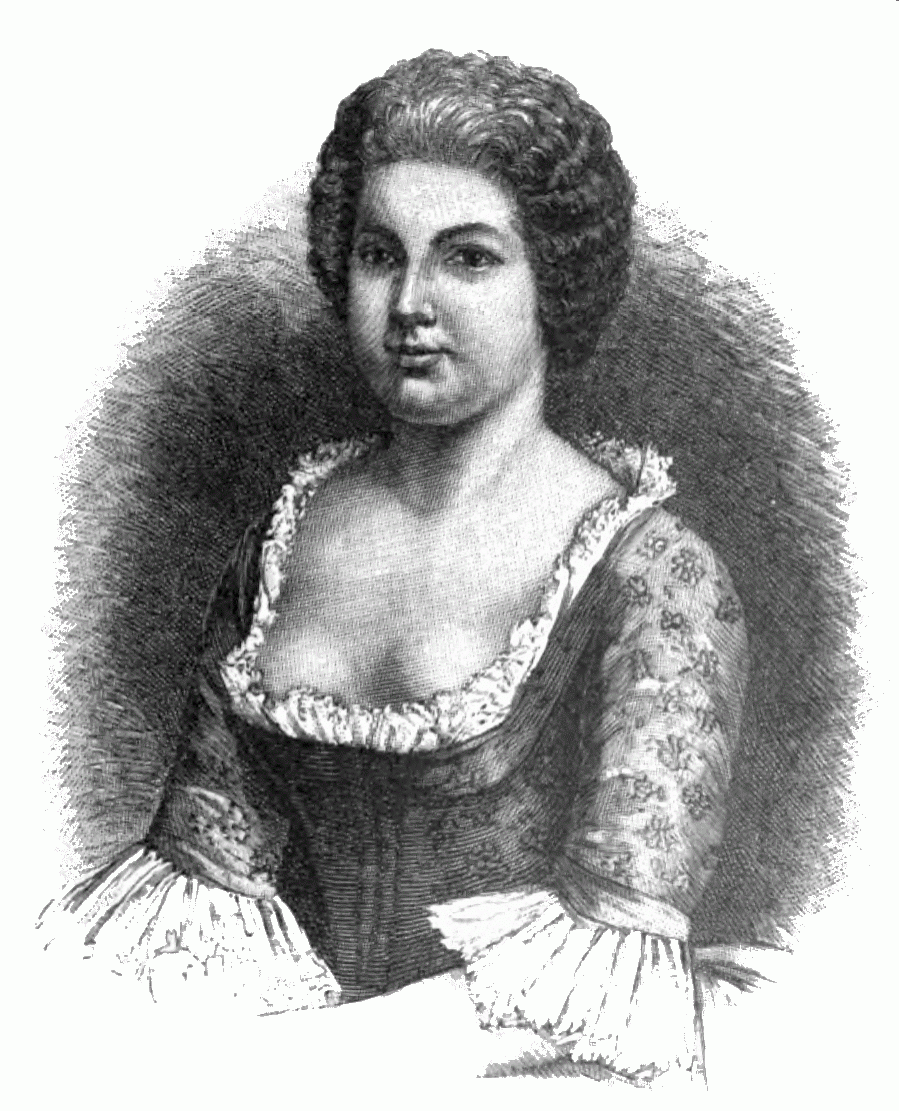
- A posthumous (1898) depiction of Neuber
- Born: Friederike Caroline Weissenborn; 9 March 1697; Reichenbach im Vogtland, Electorate of Saxony, Holy Roman Empire
- Died: 30 November 1760 (aged 63) near Dresden, Electorate of Saxony, Holy Roman Empire
- Resting place: Leubener Cemetery in Dresden
- Occupations: Actress, theatre Director, actor-manager
- Years active: 1718–1748
- Spouse: Johann Neuber

Friederike Caroline Neuber (Note: née Friederike Caroline Weissenborn, also known as Friedericke Karoline Neuber, Frederika Neuber, Karoline Neuber, Carolina Neuber, Frau Neuber, and Die Neuberin) (9 March 1697 – 30 November 1760), was a German actress and theatre director. She is considered one of the most famous actresses and actor-managers in the history of the German theatre, "influential in the development of modern German theatre." Neuber also worked to improve the social and artistic status of German actors and actresses, emphasizing naturalistic technique. During a time when theatrical managers in Germany were predominantly men, Caroline Neuber stands out in history as a remarkably ambitious woman who, during her 25-year career, was able to alter theatrical history, elevating the status of German theatre alongside of Germany's most important male theatrical leaders at the time, such as "her actor-manager husband Johann, the popular stage fool Johann Müller, the major actor of the next generation Johann Schönemann, the multi-talented newcomer Gotthold Ephraim Lessing, and principally, their de facto Dramaturg, Johann Gottsched."

== Life and work ==
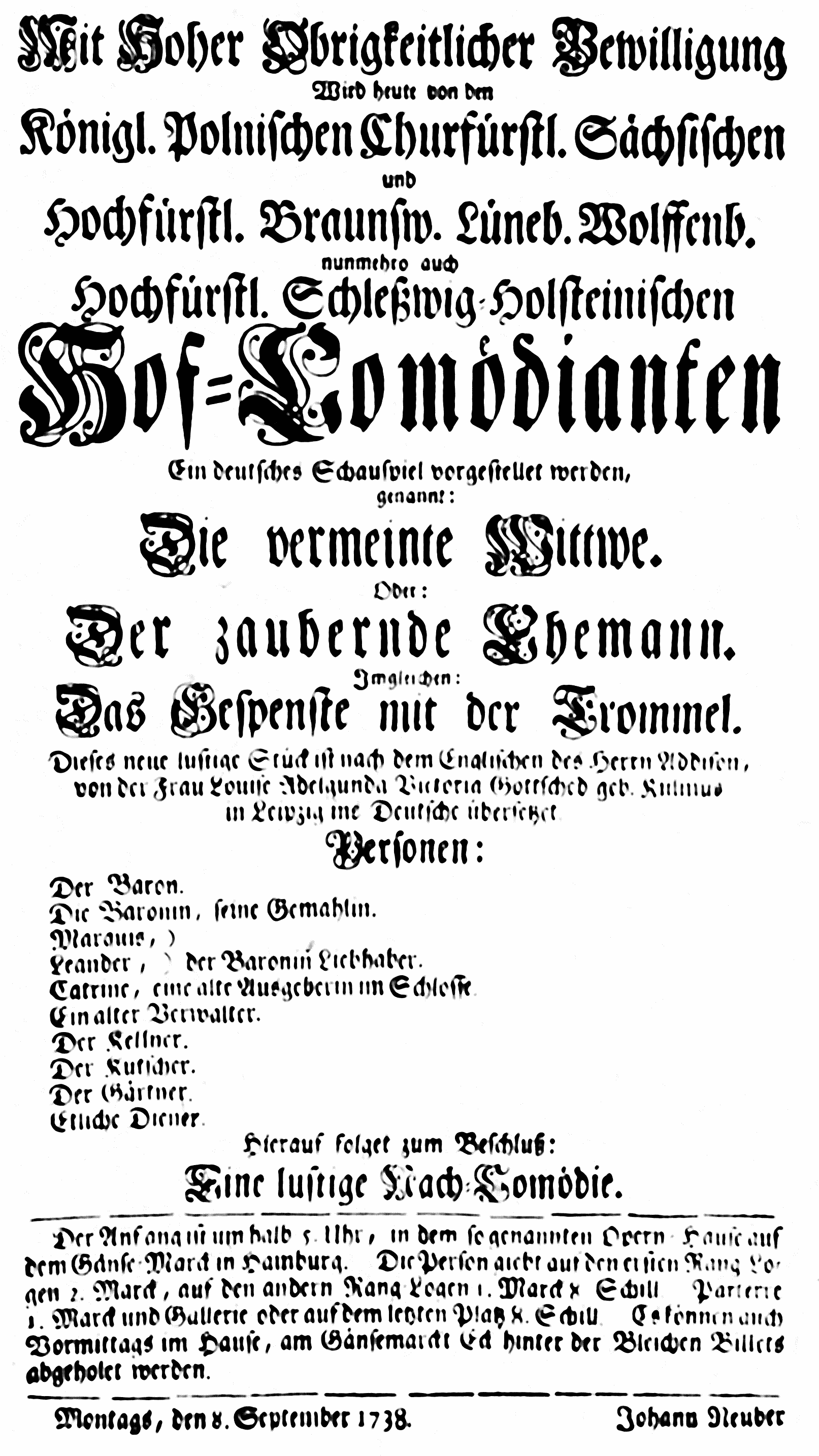
Playbill of the theatrical company of Friederike Caroline Neuber from 8 September 1738 in Hamburg.

=== Early life ===
Friederike Caroline Weissenborn was born on 9 March 1697 in Reichenbach im Vogtland to Daniel Weissenborn and his wife Anna Rosine Weissenborn, née Anna Rosine Wihelmine. Her father was a legal court inspector and her mother was very well-educated. From her mother, Caroline learned reading, writing, and French. Her tyrannical father beat her mother until her mother's early death in 1705. Caroline spent the rest of her childhood with her father in Zwickau where she lived from 1702 to 1717. Allegedly, Caroline was unloved and neglected by her father who may have also beaten her; she had a scar on her face attributed to her father's beatings. Reportedly, she attempted to escape her home as early as age 15. However, it was not until age 20, in 1717, that Caroline successfully ran away from home with Johann Neuber, a clerk who had worked for her father. The couple married one year later in 1718. Together the Neubers "served their theatrical apprenticeship in the traveling companies of Christian Spiegelberg (1717–22) and Karl Caspar Haack (1722–25)."

=== The Neuber Theatrical Troupe ===
In 1727, she and her husband founded their own acting troupe which became a "training ground for some of the great actor-managers to come". That same year their company was "granted a patent by the elector of Saxony, Frederick Augustus I, to perform at the Leipzig Easter Fair." The troupe is recorded to have played in nineteen towns and cities as spread out as Warsaw, Kiel, and Strasburg, most often in Dresden, Hamburg, and Leipzig. Although no complete repertoire for the company exists there is an existing "detailed account of eight months in 1735, 8 April to 5 December" in which the troupe is listed to have performed "seventy-five 'Schauspiele' (a mixture of 'Tragödien' and 'Cömodien') in 203 performances." Additionally, they are recorded to have performed ninety-three Nachspiele (a short play usually following a longer comedy or tragedy) in 107 performances during these eight months. The Neuber troupe has been described by historians as "a training ground for later principles" such as Heinrich Koch and Friedrich Schönemann, "each of whom founded his own troupe afterwards and enjoyed far more success than his mentor."

=== Partnership with J.C. Gottsched ===
As early as 1725, Neuber's acting technique had "attracted the attention of Johann Christoph Gottsched, the critic and drama reformer who modeled his work on classical French tragedy and comedy." Throughout her career, she was active in the introduction of the French theatre in Germany, and worked closely with Gottsched and his wife, Luise Gottsched, to elevate the status of German theatre. Gottsched was the first to call her "Die Neuberin". Gottsched was important to the Neubers' company for he initiated in their company a "careful learning of parts and rehearsal for the heavily improvised farces and harlequinades that then dominated the German stage." The theatrical partnership between Caroline Neuber and Johann Gottsched lasted until 1739 and is "usually regarded as the turning point in the history of German theatre and the start of modern German acting."

=== Banishment of Harlekin/Hanswurst ===
In 1736, Neuber came to Frankfurt with the intention to perform respectable theatre and set up her stage on the Liebfrauenberg. The Neubers pattern in 1736-7 was to play "major dramas of classical base of German imitations" while excluding the traditionally crude topics associated with the popular theatrical character Harlekin from their performances. This demonstrated that a change in tone for theatre in Frankfurt was beginning, with the Neubers performances that were more respectable than the popular theatre revolving around Harlekin. However, it took more than Neuber's resolve to "change the taste and demands of most audiences of the day."

In 1737, Neuber symbolically banished Hanswurst from the stage as part of her efforts to elevate the status of German theatre. The staged banishment has generally been regarded as an emblematic moment in German theatre history for the transition from popular, improvised, so-called "Stegreiftheater" to a modern bourgeois literary mode. These Hanswurt plays were created specifically for the enjoyment of male audiences. During this period it was becoming more acceptable for women to pursue work as actresses; however, it was still unacceptable for women to work as managers of theatrical companies. Theatre historians of the late eighteenth century often described Caroline Neuber as one who had a masculine spirit and manly ambitions in order to reconcile what they viewed as "the disparity between her professional achievements and her gender role." Neuber died near Dresden, aged 63.

=== Partnership with Lessing ===
Caroline is attributed with discovering playwright Gotthold Ephraim Lessing, often considered by historians to be the first dramaturg. After meeting Caroline, his interest in theatre grew. He translated several French plays for her and eventually wrote his first play, The Young Scholar which Neuber produced for him in 1748.

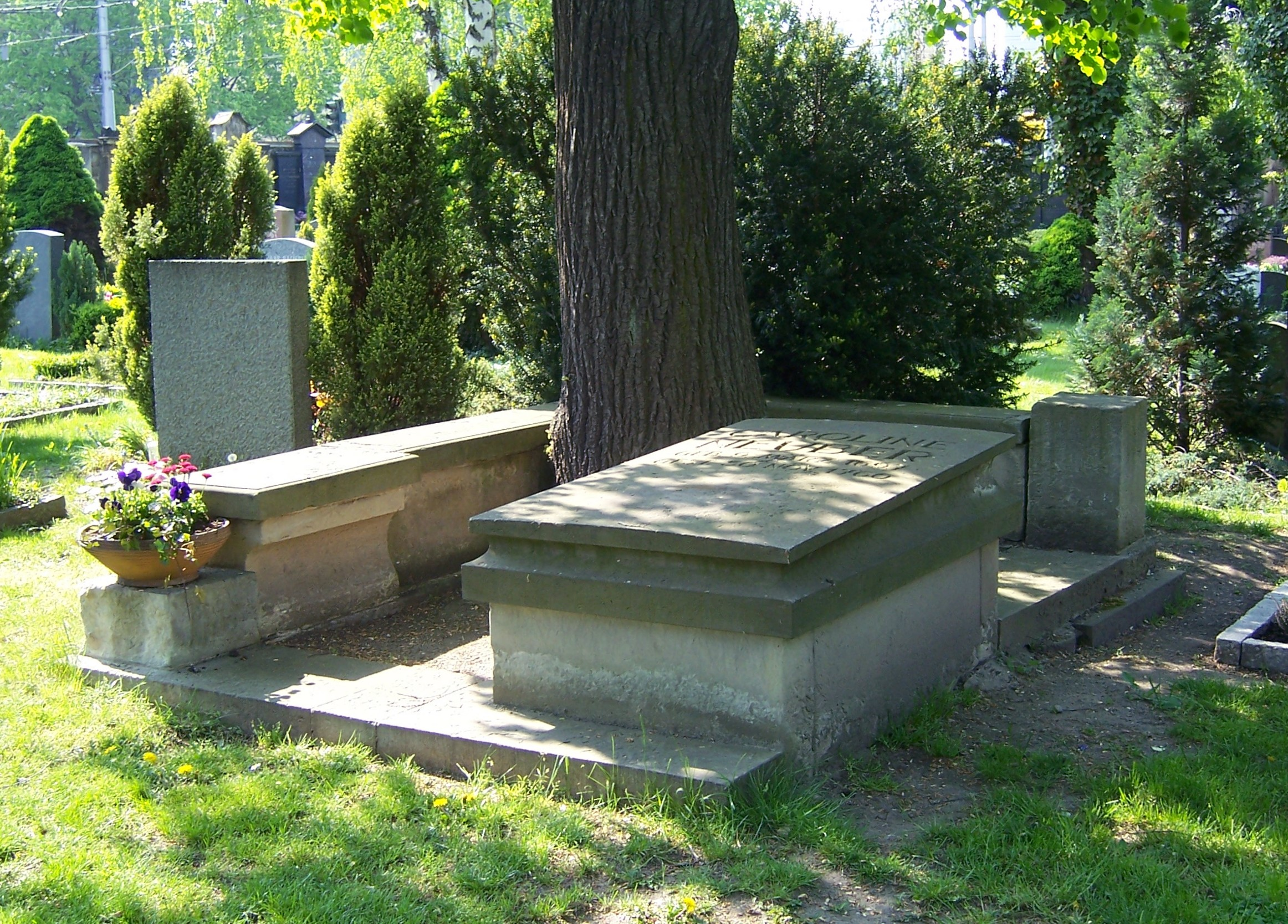
Friederike Caroline Neuber grave in the Leubener cemetery in Dresden

== Legacy ==
=== Caroline Neuber (play) ===
Caroline Neuber, called Die Neubrin in many of its productions, is a biographical play written by Eberhard Keindorff and Gunther Weisenborn about Caroline Neuber's life. The play was created for actress Agnes Straub. Caroline Neuber premiered in the 1934/35 season in The Third Reich and was written as "the government consolidated its power and generated arts bureaucracies to oversee the publication, production, and response to plays." The play was permitted publication in 1934 and premiered in Berlin in 1935. Caroline Neuber is unusual for its era, in which German theatre was censored by the Nazis, for the content of the play "challenges some of the basic cultural prejudices of the Third Reich."

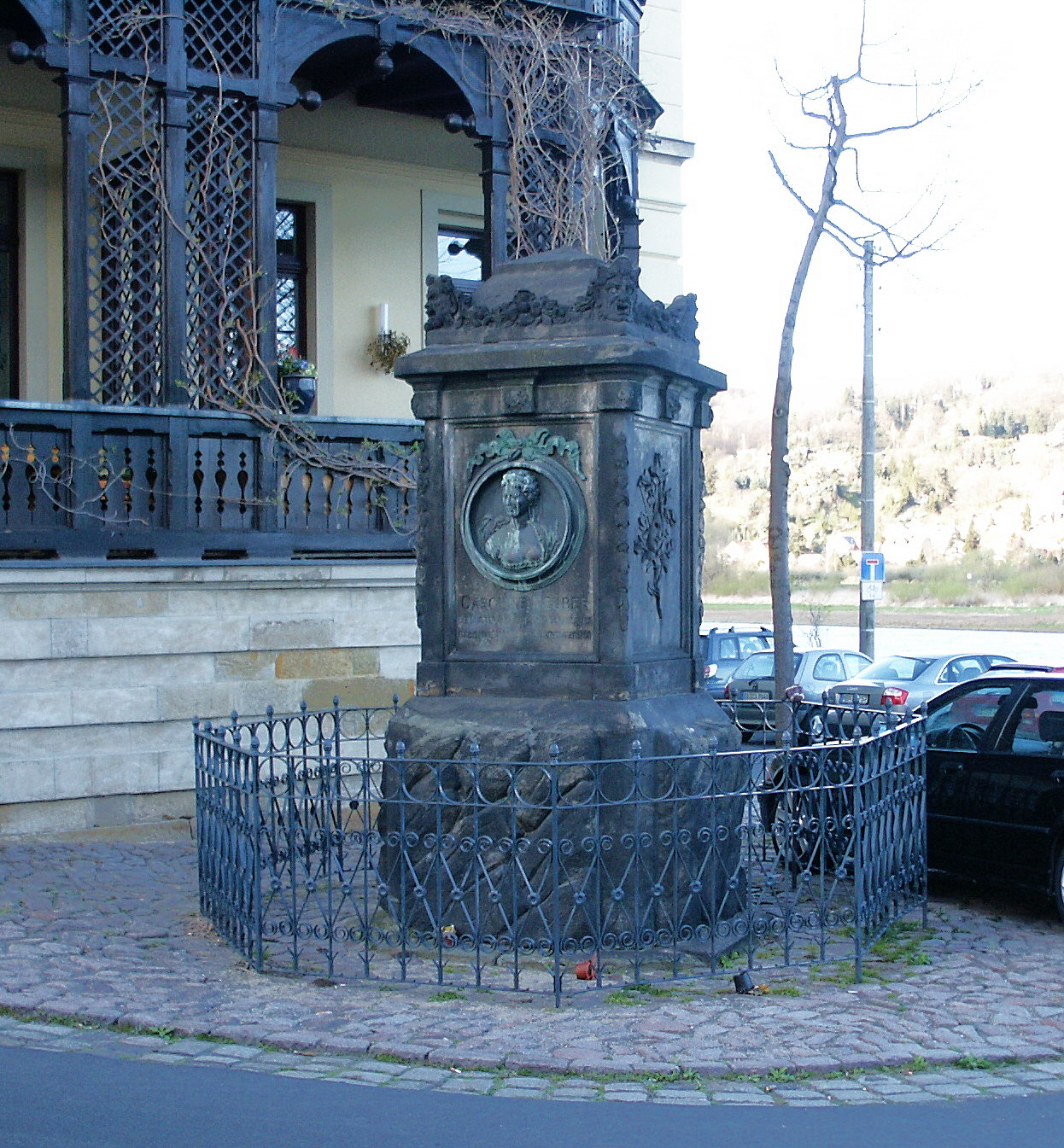
Caroline Neuber monument in Dresden-Laubegast

By this point in history, Caroline Neuber was seen by theatre professionals as an important theatrical reformer of the 18th century. Because of this Keindorff and Weisenborn crafted a play about her life that served as a means for audiences to compare Neuber's reformation to the Nazi-directed theatrical reformation and thus, critique Nazi-theatre appropriately. When analyzed, Caroline Neuber is interpreted as "a condemnation of the Third Reich itself." However, for those who had the power to censor theatre, Neuber's biography play was seen simply as a play about a famous actor, manager, and reformer that "complimented National Socialist reforms of the stage." The Nazis were initiating reforms to create what they saw as "new, honest, noble, wonderful German theatre." Because of this to "the general audience Die Neuberin was star biography; for the preferred audience, the reform stage of the past collided with the reforming stage of the present." Caroline Neuber's legacy as not only an actress/manager but a reformer of the German stage served as a vehicle for Germans to learn from the past and critique the present.

=== Caroline Neuber Prize ===
This award commemorates Neuber's theatrical contributions to Germany. Since 1998, the city of Leipzig awards the Caroline Neuber Prize endowed with €6,000 every two years on her birthday in March. The prize is awarded to a female theatre artist from a German-speaking country who sets new standards for excellence in theatre arts. Those who have been honored with the prize include Monika Gintersdorfer, Jutta Hoffmann, Inge Keller, Konstanze Lauterbach, Nele Hertling, Karin Henkel, Sasha Waltz, and Ann-Elisabeth Wolff.
