= Die Entführung oder die zärtliche Mutter =

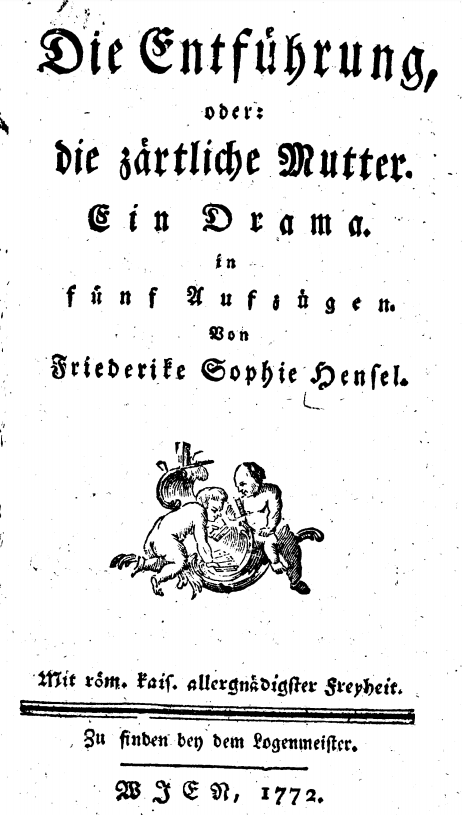
Original cover of Die Entführung, oder: die zärtliche Mutter

Die Entführung, oder: die zärtliche Mutter ("The Abduction, or The Tender Mother") is a play in five acts by Friederike Sophie Seyler. It was originally published in 1770 under the title Die Familie auf dem Lande ("The Family in the Country") and then in a revised version under the new title in 1772. It is one of few 18th century plays written by a female playwright. The play was a dramatic adaptation of the 1767 novel Conclusion of the Memoirs of Miss Sidney Bidulph (1767) by Frances Sheridan, that was a sequel to her earlier novel Memoirs of Miss Sidney Bidulph. The latter novel was itself inspired by Pamela; or, Virtue Rewarded by Samuel Richardson. The play is written in the style of a comédie larmoyante, popular with female playwrights, where a happy ending follows a tragic narrative.
