= Seyler Theatre Company =

- A silhouette of Abel Seyler
- Company type: Theatre company
- Predecessor: Hamburg National Theatre
- Founded: 1769
- Defunct: 1779
- Owner: Abel Seyler

The Seyler Theatre Company, also known as the Seyler Company (German: Seylersche Schauspiel-Gesellschaft, sometimes Seylersche Truppe), was a travelling theatrical company founded in 1769 by Abel Seyler. It was one of the most famous and ambitious theatrical companies of Europe in the years from 1769 to 1779, and played a crucial role in theatrical innovation, the development of a serious German opera tradition, and the Sturm und Drang movement. The Sturm und Drang period is named for a play commissioned by the Seyler company.

== History ==
Abel Seyler was a Hamburg merchant and banker originally from Switzerland who became "the leading patron of German theatre" in his lifetime. The Seyler Theatre Company was largely a continuation of the Hamburgische Entreprise, whose dramaturge was Gotthold Ephraim Lessing and whose main owner was Seyler. The Seyler theatrical company became one of the most famous theatrical companies of Europe in the 18th century, attracting some of Germany's leading actors, playwrights and composers. It originally comprised around 60 members, including an orchestra, a ballet, house dramatists and set designers. Between 1777 and 1778 Seyler employed some 230 actors, singers and musicians. The company was originally (from 1769) contracted by the Hanoverian court with performing at Hanover and other cities of the kingdom. The company would eventually perform all across Germany, and performed for three years at the Weimar Schlosstheater, invited by Duchess Anna Amalia of Brunswick-Wolfenbüttel. When Anna Amalia succeeded in engaging the Seyler Company, this was "an extremely fortunate coup. The Seyler Company was the best theatre company in Germany at that time." The company had an important role in the development of German opera in the late 18th century.

A number of plays were written for the Seyler theatrical company. For example, the play Sturm und Drang (which gave its name to the Sturm und Drang period) was written originally for the company by Friedrich Maximilian Klinger (Goethe's childhood friend), then employed as its playwright, and first performed in 1777. In 1789, Abel Seyler's wife, the celebrated actress Friederike Sophie Seyler, published the Singspiel Hüon und Amande, that was plagiarized by the troupe of Emanuel Schikaneder and also greatly influenced The Magic Flute.

Threatened by bankruptcy in 1770, the company was saved by Seyler's brother-in-law, Johann Gerhard Reinhard Andreae.

== People associated with the Seyler Theatre Company ==
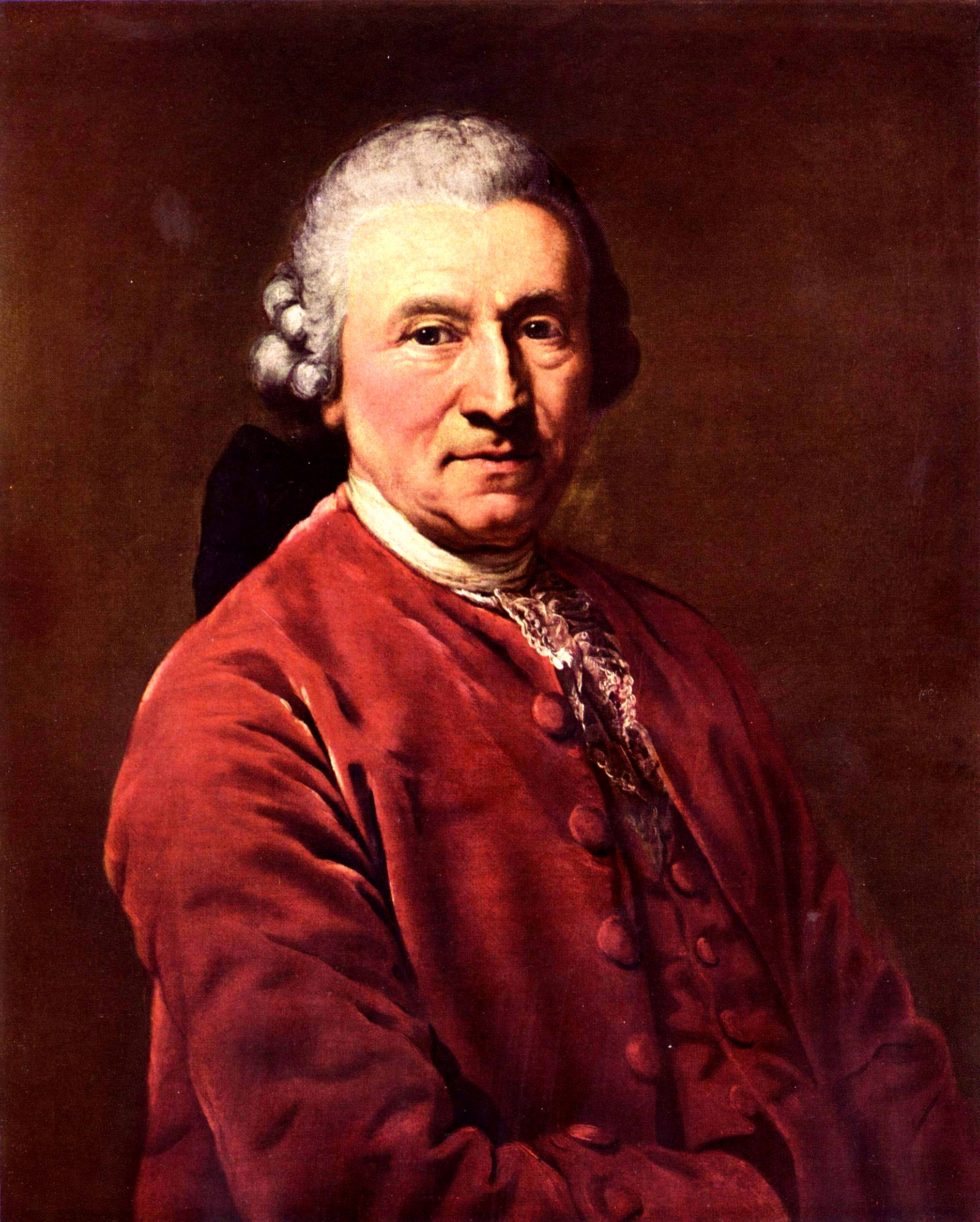
Konrad Ekhof

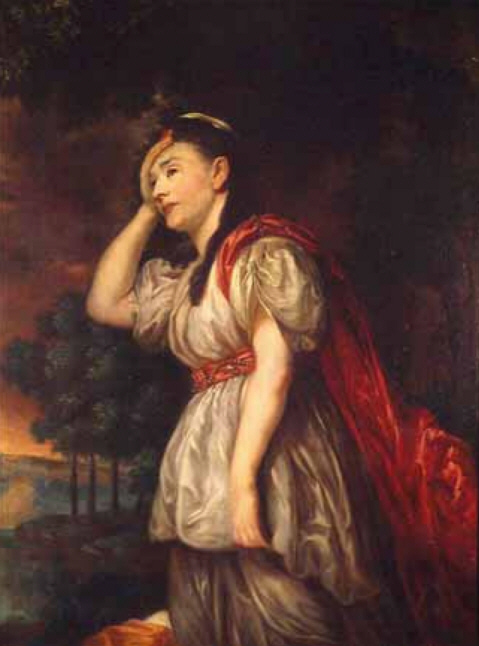
Esther Charlotte Brandes as Ariadne in Ariadne auf Naxos, a play written for the Seyler Theatre Company

- Abel Seyler (director/owner/actor)
- Friederike Sophie Seyler, formerly Hensel (actress; wife of the latter)
- Konrad Ekhof (actor)
- Georgine Ekhof (actress; wife of the latter)
- Franziska Romana Koch (soprano)
- Johann Christian Brandes (actor)
- Esther Charlotte Brandes (actress; wife of the latter)
- Friedrich Maximilian Klinger (playwright)
- Johann Adam Hiller (musical director)
- Christian Gottlob Neefe (musical director)
- Georg Anton Benda (composer)
- Anton Schweitzer (musical director)
- Christoph Martin Wieland (librettist)
- Heinrich Leopold Wagner (dramatist, producer, translator and lawyer)
- Giovanni Federico Toscani (tenor, 1775–77)

== Works written for the Seyler company (selection) ==
- Sturm und Drang by Friedrich Maximilian Klinger
- Ariadne auf Naxos by Georg Anton Benda
- Medea by Georg Anton Benda
- Alceste by Anton Schweitzer (composer) and Christoph Martin Wieland (libretto)

== Bibliography ==
- Thomas Bauman, "New directions: the Seyler company" (pp. 91–131), in North German Opera in the Age of Goethe, Cambridge University Press, 1985
- Thomas Bauman, Music and Drama in Germany: A Traveling Company and Its Repertory, 1767–1781, PhD dissertation on the Seyler Theatre Company, University of California, Berkeley, 1977
