= Oberon (poem) =

German epic poem

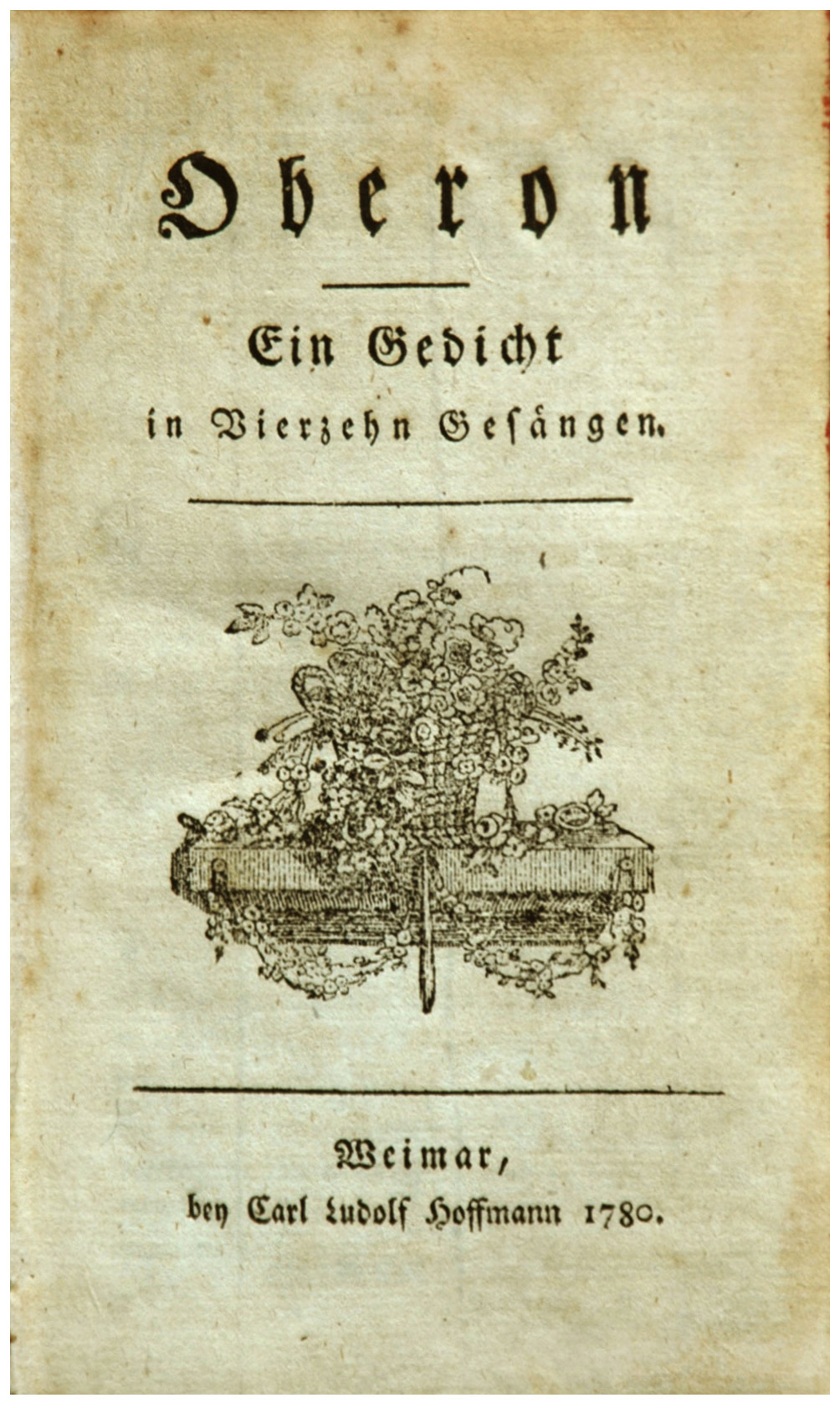
Title page of the first edition, without the author's name.

Oberon is an epic poem by the German writer Christoph Martin Wieland. It was based on the epic romance Huon de Bordeaux, a French medieval tale, and influenced by Shakespeare's A Midsummer Night's Dream and Alexander Pope's version of Geoffrey Chaucer's The Merchant's Tale. It first appeared in 1780 and went through seven rewrites before its final form was published in 1796.

== Plot ==
For slaying Charlot (a despicable son of Karl the Great, aka Charlemagne) Huon, duke of Guienne, is condemned to go to Babylon (or Bagdad) and demand four molars and a tuft of the beard of the kalif after kissing the latter's daughter and slaying her intended. This feat is accomplished through the friendship of Oberon and the magic power of his horn, a blast of which causes all wicked persons to dance, and of a certain ring, which had been taken from its owner, Titania, and to which all the spirit world was subject. Commanded to go to the Pope at Rome before consummating marriage with the kalif's daughter, Huon yields to temptation and the couple are thrown on a desert isle by Oberon, who had deserted his queen Titania with the vow never to return to her unless a human couple should be found who were absolutely faithful, since she had championed the faithless child bride of an aged dotard - the whole concept of Wieland's poem is centred on the invented quarrel between Oberon and Titania. Thrown into captivity in Tunis by Titania's machinations, Huon and Rezia withstand the first test of temptation and, reunited, return to Paris and reconcile Huon with Karl.

== Influence ==
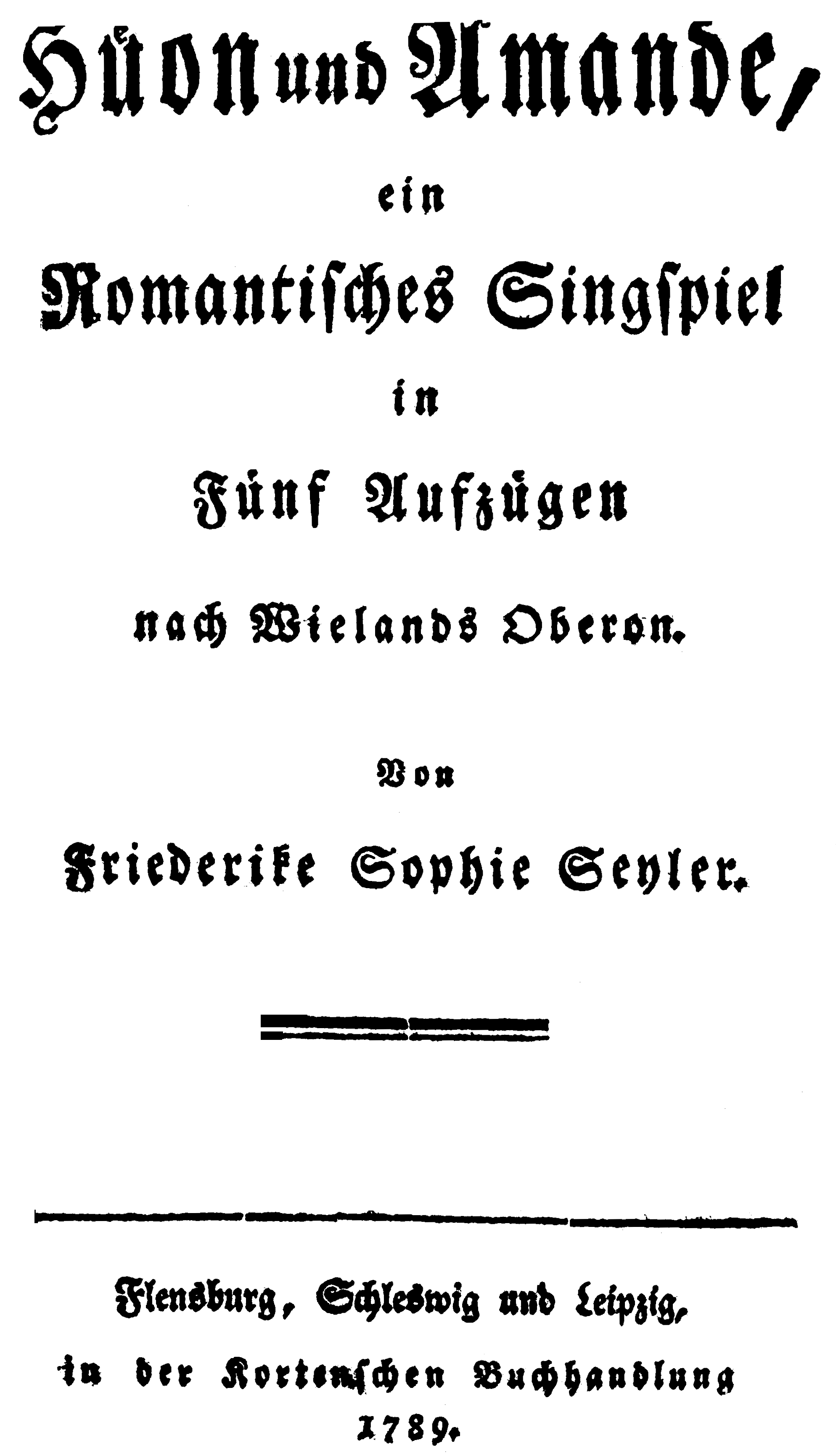
Sophie Seyler's Hüon und Amande, also known as Oberon

It had a major influence on many musical and poetic works of the time, such as Schiller's Don Carlos, Goethe's Faust: The Second Part of the Tragedy and Mozart's The Magic Flute, as well as on the Portuguese poet Francisco Manoel de Nascimento.

An adaptation of the poem by Sophie Seyler, titled Hüon und Amande, was re-adapted by Karl Ludwig Giesecke to provide a libretto for Paul Wranitzky, without crediting her. Its English translators include Matthew Lewis, William Sotheby and John Quincy Adams. The libretto of The Magic Flute by Emanuel Schikaneder was evidently greatly inspired by Giesecke's and thus on Seyler's version of Oberon.

Carl Maria von Weber used the poem as the basis for his last opera, Oberon, in 1826.

The artist Gustav Paul Closs provided illustrations for it.
