= Hamburg Dramaturgy =

1767–69 essay collection by Gotthold Ephraim Lessing

The Hamburg Dramaturgy (German: Hamburgische Dramaturgie) is a highly influential work on drama by Gotthold Ephraim Lessing, written between 1767 and 1769 when he worked as a dramaturg for Abel Seyler's Hamburg National Theatre. It was not originally conceived as a unified and systematical book, but rather as series of essays on the theater, which Lessing wrote as commentary on the plays of the short-lived Hamburg National Theater. This collection of 101 short essays represents one of the first sustained critical engagements with the potential of theater as a vehicle for the advancement of humanistic discourse. In many ways, the Hamburg Dramaturgy defined the new field of dramaturgy, and also introduced the term.

During the time Lessing wrote the Hamburg Dramaturgy, there was a new movement of German theatre, based on self-reflection. Actors were beginning to perform the inner and outer lives of their characters at the same time. One of Lessing's most famous and renowned quotes from the compilation considers the responsibilities of the actor and the playwright: “The great discernment of the drama critic lies in his ability to distinguish, whenever he feels pleasure or displeasure, to what extent that feeling should be credited to the writer or to the actor”

The idea of a journal with Lessing as a dramatic critic to reflect on the Hamburg National Theater's efforts was conceived by the theatre's founder Johann Friedrich Löwen, and Abel Seyler, "the power behind the throne," who at first reluctantly agreed, but was eventually won over by the journal's success. Because the plays of the new German Bourgeoisie theatre became more detailed and complicated, the audience often felt confused or left out; Lessing’s development of the Hamburg Dramaturgy was in part a reaction to this.

Topics covered by Lessing in the series of essays include Aristotle's theory of tragedy, acting theory, the role of theater in society, the means by which theater achieves its emotional effects, criticism of the actor and the play, issues of translation, and a nascent theory of the psychology of emotions. Lessing's writings were influential for many German theater artists who came after, notably Bertolt Brecht.

== Analysis of actors ==
The analysis of the actor, according to Lessing, is grey area for a dramaturge. It is important to know that with an actor's performance, the circumstances are a large factor to the performance, whereas, for example, the text itself is easier to judge because it simply involves literary analysis. When analyzing an actor's performance, current events, environment, and mentality of the actor must all be taken into account. When Lessing published his essays, numerous actors from Hamburg plays were upset with Lessing's carelessness and disregard of their talents in his essay.

== Translations ==
In 1890, Helen Zimmern published an English translation of the text, which was re-published by Dover in 1962. Zimmern's translation omits nearly 30% of the original text. Translators Wendy Arons and Sara Figal, with editor Natalya Baldyga, are producing a new, complete, and fully annotated translation of the text; the essays are being published online at MediaCommons Press and will be published in print form by Routledge.

Lessing's collection of essays are still being used as references today for the topic of dramaturgy, especially as a reference for art of theatre as an outlet for self-reflection, and how circumstances of the era during which a play was written affects how the audience perceives the work.
