= Hamburg National Theatre =

- A silhouette of Abel Seyler
- Company type: Theatre company
- Founded: 1767
- Defunct: 1769
- Successor: Seyler Theatre Company
- Headquarters: Hamburg
- Owner: Abel Seyler

The Hamburg Enterprise (German: Hamburgische Entreprise), commonly known as the Hamburg National Theatre, was a theatre company in Hamburg (now Germany), that existed 1767–1769 at the Gänsemarkt square, and that was led by Abel Seyler. It was the first attempt to establish a national theatre in Germany. It was modelled after Det Kongelige Teater, founded by Ludvig Holberg in Denmark in 1748. Its leading actor was Konrad Ekhof and the theatre employed Gotthold Ephraim Lessing as the world's first dramaturg; Lessing's influential Hamburg Dramaturgy, based on his work at the Hamburg National Theatre, defined the new field of dramaturgy and also introduced the term. The theatre premiered Lessing's Minna von Barnhelm on 30 September 1767.

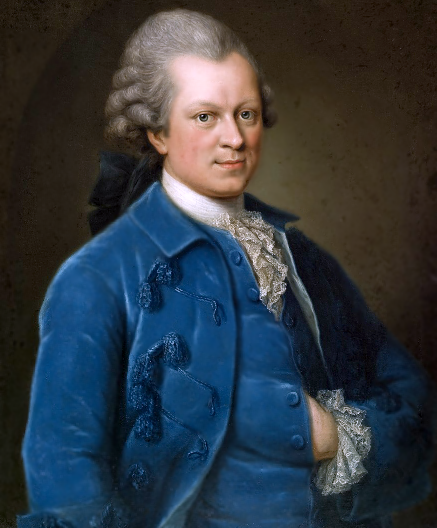
A portrait of Gotthold Ephraim Lessing as dramaturg of the Hamburg National Theatre

The Hamburg National Theatre was mainly owned and led by the former banker Abel Seyler, who invested much of his remaining fortune in the enterprise after suffering "a sensational bankruptcy for an enormous sum" shortly before. The Hamburg National Theatre had to close in 1769 when Seyler's money had run out after two years of lavish spending. The enterprise was effectively succeeded by the Seyler Theatre Company. Seyler would also later retain the vision of a "national theatre" during his work in Mannheim.

== Literature ==
- Roger Bauer, Jürgen Wertheimer: Das Ende des Stegreifspiels, die Geburt des Nationaltheaters. Ein Wendepunkt der Geschichte des europäischen Dramas. München: Fink 1983. ISBN 3-7705-2008-4
