= Dramaturge =

Literary adviser for drama productions

A dramaturge or dramaturg (from Ancient Greek δραματουργός dramatourgós) is a literary adviser or editor in a theatre, opera, or film company who researches, selects, adapts, edits, and interprets scripts, libretti, texts, and printed programmes (or helps others with these tasks), consults authors, and does public relations work. Its modern-day function was originated by the innovations of Gotthold Ephraim Lessing, an 18th-century German playwright, philosopher, and theatre theorist.

== Responsibilities ==
One of the dramaturge's contributions is to categorise and discuss the various types of plays or operas, their interconnectedness and their styles. The responsibilities of a dramaturge vary from one theatre or opera company to the next. They might include the hiring of actors, the development of a season of plays or operas with a sense of coherence among them, assistance with and editing of new plays or operas by resident or guest playwrights or composers/librettists, the creation of programs or accompanying educational services, and helping the director with rehearsals. At larger theatres or opera houses, the dramaturge works on the historical and cultural research into the play or opera and its setting.

In theatre companies, a dramaturge will create a workbook for the director and actors and work extensively with the director prior to the first rehearsal.

== History ==
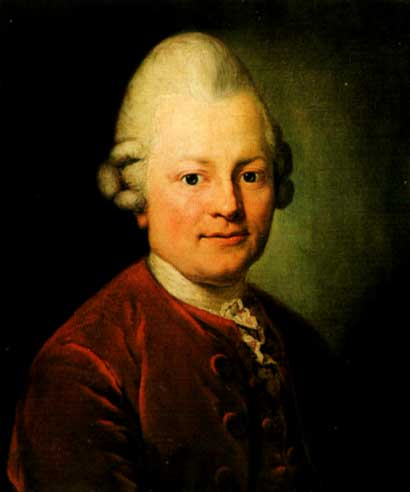
Gotthold Ephraim Lessing

Gotthold Ephraim Lessing was hired by the Hamburg National Theatre in 1767, to serve as the theatre's critic of plays and acting, a position which would later be named dramaturge. This position grew over time to what it is today, encompassing the wide variety of tasks seen by modern dramaturges.

== Discrepancies with definition ==
The modern definition of 'dramaturge' is often debated as to what specific tasks this job does; some define it as the bridge between the director and the actors, while others define it as one who determines the meaning of plays and shows for the actors, and also another group that claim that even they don't quite have a complete definition for their job. This discrepancy between dramaturges is likely due to the lack of an official historical definition, and the wide variety of tasks that dramaturges could be asked to work on, depending on the theatre, director, the show being produced, and the actors. Since Lessing did not create an official definition for his own position at the Hamburg National Theatre, modern dramaturges have to infer their tasks based on what Lessing did during his career, and adapt to the current needs of modern theatre.

== Recent growth ==
Since the year 2000, the number of dramaturges working around the world has increased. In 2000, 400 active dramaturges were recorded in the United States, with that number growing. There are various possible causes of this growth, but some dramaturges attribute the growth to the fact that dramaturgy combines two popular studies for young students: the liberal arts and theatre. Some dramaturges are worried, however, that this growth may slow down, due to a decrease in the number of modern plays being written.
