= Gotthold Ephraim Lessing =

German Enlightenment writer (1729–1781)

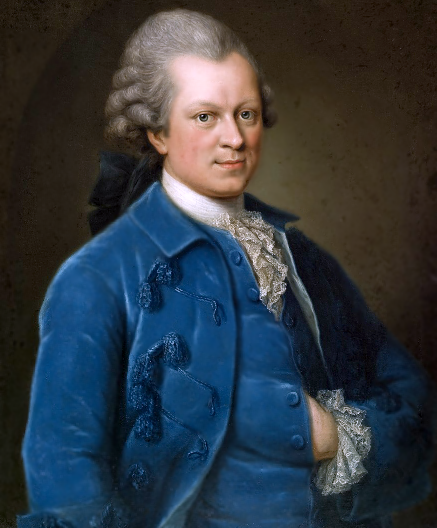
- Portrait of Lessing by Anna Rosina Lisiewska during his time as dramaturg of Abel Seyler's Hamburg National Theatre (1767/1768)
- Born: 22 January 1729; Kamenz, Upper Lusatia, Saxony
- Died: 15 February 1781 (aged 52); Braunschweig, Brunswick-Lüneburg
- Education: Leipzig University; University of Wittenberg
- Occupations: Writer, philosopher, dramatist, publicist, art critic, and dramaturg
- Spouse: Eva König (m. 1776; d. 1778)
- Writing career
- Notable works: Miss Sara Sampson, Emilia Galotti, Minna von Barnhelm, Nathan the Wise, Hamburgische Dramaturgie
- Movement: German Enlightenment

Signature
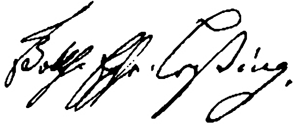

Gotthold Ephraim Lessing (/ˈlɛsɪŋ/; German: [ˈɡɔthɔlt ˈeːfʁa.ɪm ˈlɛsɪŋ]; 22 January 1729 – 15 February 1781) was a German philosopher, dramatist, publicist and art critic. He was a representative of the Enlightenment. His plays and theoretical writings substantially influenced the development of German literature. He is widely considered by theatre historians to be the first dramaturg in his role at Abel Seyler's Hamburg National Theatre. The word "dramaturgy" first appears in his work Hamburg Dramaturgy.

== Life ==
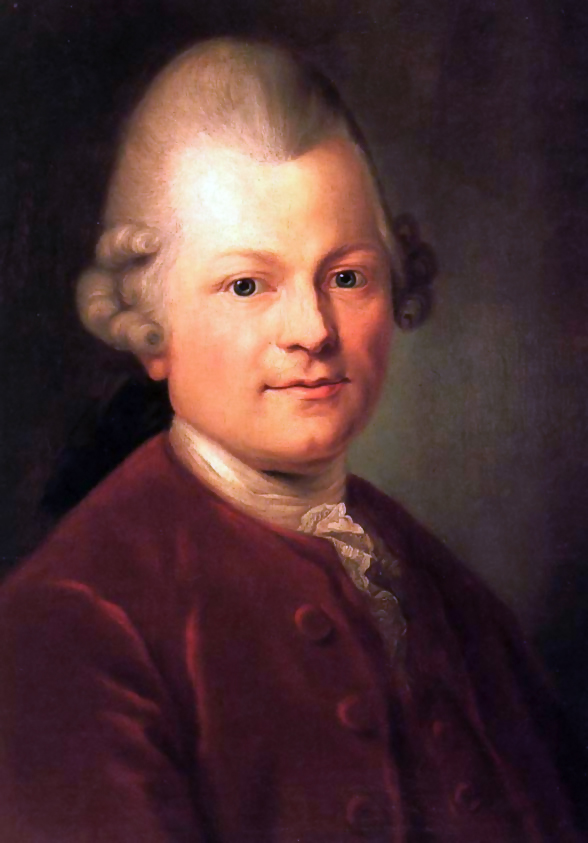
Gotthold Ephraim Lessing, by Anton Graff 1771

Lessing was born in Kamenz, a small town in Saxony, to pastor and theologian Johann Gottfried Lessing (1693–1770) and his wife Justine Salome Feller (1703–1777), daughter of pastor of Kamenz, Gottfried Feller (1674–1733). His father was a Lutheran minister and wrote on theology. Young Lessing studied at the Latin School in Kamenz from 1737 to 1741. With a father who wanted his son to follow in his footsteps, Lessing next attended the Fürstenschule St. Afra in Meissen. After completing his education at St. Afra's, he enrolled at Leipzig University where he pursued a degree in theology, medicine, philosophy, and philology (1746–1748).

It was here that his relationship with Karoline Neuber, a famous German actress, began. He translated several French plays for her, and his interest in theatre grew. During this time he wrote his first play, The Young Scholar. Neuber eventually produced the play in 1748.

From 1748 to 1760, Lessing lived in Leipzig and Berlin. He began to work as a reviewer and editor for the Vossische Zeitung and other periodicals. Lessing formed a close connection with his cousin, Christlob Mylius, and decided to follow him to Berlin. In 1750, Lessing and Mylius teamed together to begin a periodical publication named Beiträge zur Historie und Aufnahme des Theaters. The publication ran only four issues, but it caught the public's eye and revealed Lessing to be a serious critic and theorist of drama.

In 1752, he took his master's degree in Wittenberg. From 1760 to 1765, he worked in Breslau (now Wrocław) as secretary to General Tauentzien during the Seven Years' War between Britain and France, which had effects in Europe. It was during this time that he wrote his famous Laocoön.

In 1765, Lessing returned to Berlin, leaving in 1767 to work for three years at the Hamburg National Theatre. Actor-manager Konrad Ackermann began construction of Germany's first permanent national theatre in Hamburg, established by Johann Friedrich Löwen. The owners of the new Hamburg National Theatre hired Lessing as the theatre's critic of plays and acting, an activity later known as dramaturgy (based on his own words), making Lessing the very first dramaturge. The theatre's main backer was Abel Seyler, a former currency speculator who since became known as "the leading patron of German theatre." There he met Eva König, his future wife. His work in Hamburg formed the basis of his pioneering work on drama, titled Hamburgische Dramaturgie. Unfortunately, because of financial losses due to pirated editions of the Hamburgische Dramaturgie, the Hamburg Theatre closed just three years later.

In 1770, Lessing became librarian at the ducal library, now the Herzog August Library (Herzog-August-Bibliothek, Bibliotheca Augusta), in Wolfenbüttel under the commission of the Duke of Brunswick. His tenure there was energetic, if interrupted by many journeys. In 1775, for example, he accompanied Prince Leopold to Italy. Follower of Spinoza's philosophy, on 14 October 1771, Lessing was initiated into Freemasonry in the lodge "Zu den drei Goldenen Rosen" in Hamburg.

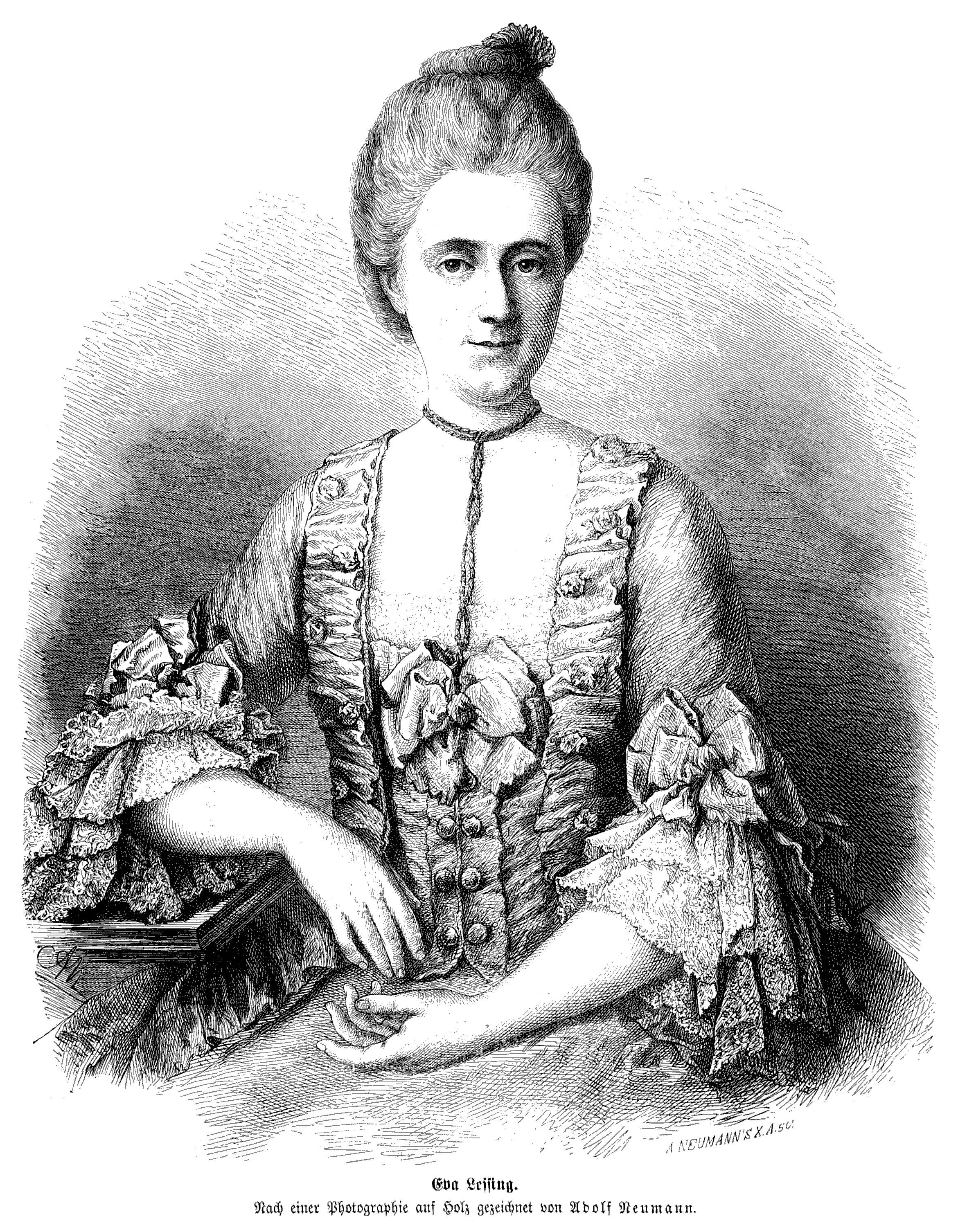
Wife Eva Lessing

In 1773, he discovered Archimedes' cattle problem in a Greek manuscript containing a poem of 44 lines, in the Herzog August Library in Wolfenbüttel. This problem would remain unsolved until 1880. In 1776, he married Eva König, who was then a widow, in Jork (near Hamburg). She died in 1778 after giving birth to a short-lived son. On 15 February 1781, Lessing, aged 52, died during a visit to the wine dealer Angott in Brunswick.

Lessing was also famous for his friendship with Jewish-German philosopher Moses Mendelssohn. A 2003 biography of Mendelssohn's grandson, Felix, describes their friendship as one of the most "illuminating metaphors [for] the clarion call of the Enlightenment for religious tolerance". It was this relationship that sparked his interest in popular religious debates of the time. He began publishing heated pamphlets on his beliefs which were eventually banned. It was this banishment that inspired him to return to theatre to portray his views and to write Nathan the Wise.

== Works ==
Early in his life, Lessing showed interest in the theatre. In his theoretical and critical writings on the subject—as in his own plays—he tried to contribute to the development of a new type of theatre in Germany. With this he especially turned against the then predominant literary theory of Gottsched and his followers. Lessing's Hamburgische Dramaturgie ran critiques of plays that were performed in the Hamburg Theatre, but after dealing with dissatisfied actors and actresses, Lessing redirected his writings to more of an analysis on the proper uses of drama. Lessing advocated the outline of drama in Aristotle's Poetics. He believed the French Academy had devalued the uses of drama through their neoclassical rules of form and separation of genres. His repeated opinions on this issue influenced theatre practitioners who began the movement of rejecting theatre rules known as Sturm und Drang ("Storm and Stress"). He also supported serious reception of Shakespeare's works. He worked with many theatre groups (e.g. that of the Neuberin).

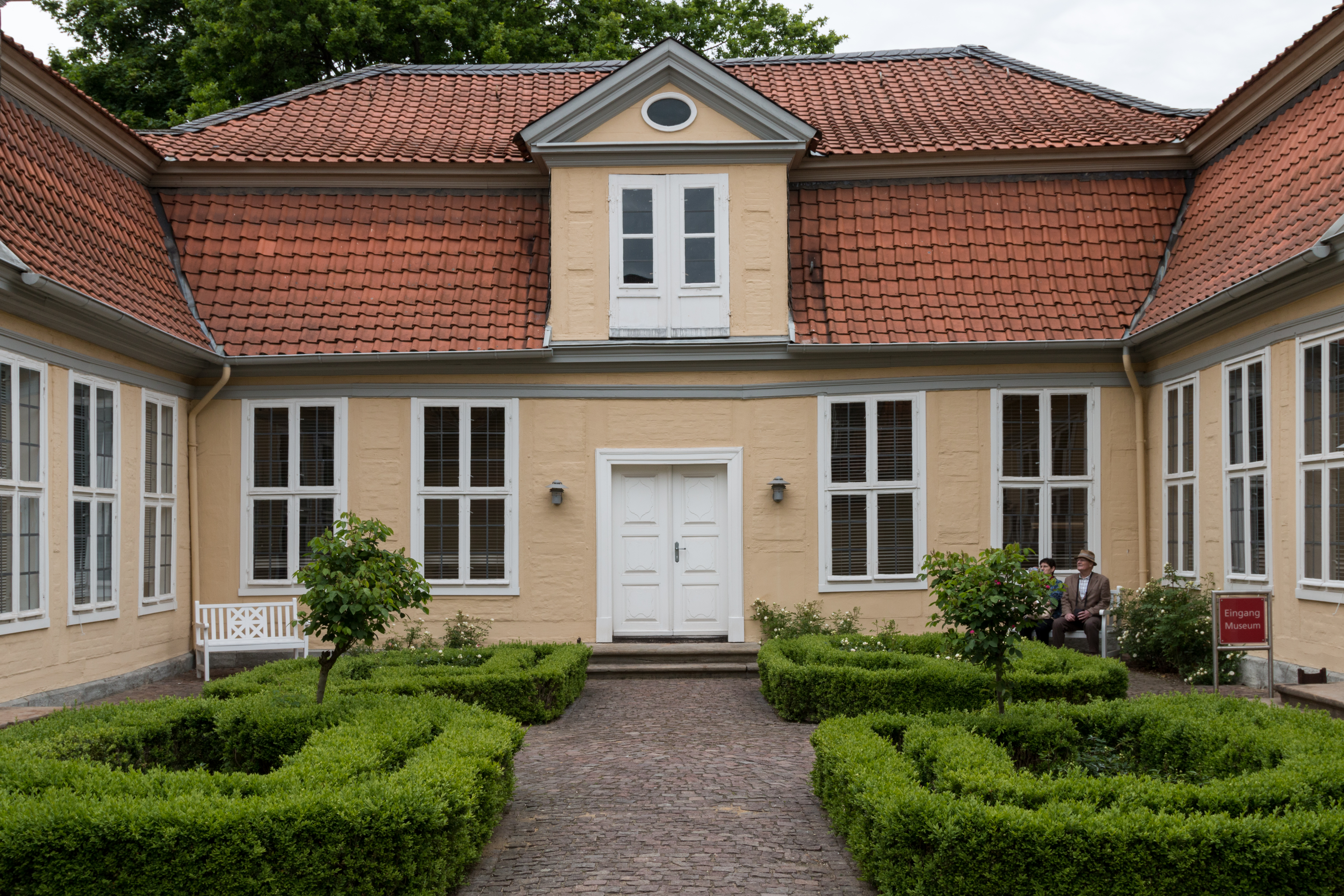
House, Wolfenbüttel

In Hamburg he tried with others to set up the German National Theatre. Today his own works appear as prototypes of the later developed bourgeois German drama. Scholars see Miss Sara Sampson and Emilia Galotti as amongst the first bourgeois tragedies, Minna von Barnhelm (Minna of Barnhelm) as the model for many classic German comedies, Nathan the Wise (Nathan der Weise) as the first German drama of ideas ("Ideendrama"). His theoretical writings Laocoön and Hamburg Dramaturgy (Hamburgische Dramaturgie) set the standards for the discussion of aesthetic and literary theoretical principles. Lessing advocated that dramaturgs should carry their work out working directly with theatre companies rather than in isolation.

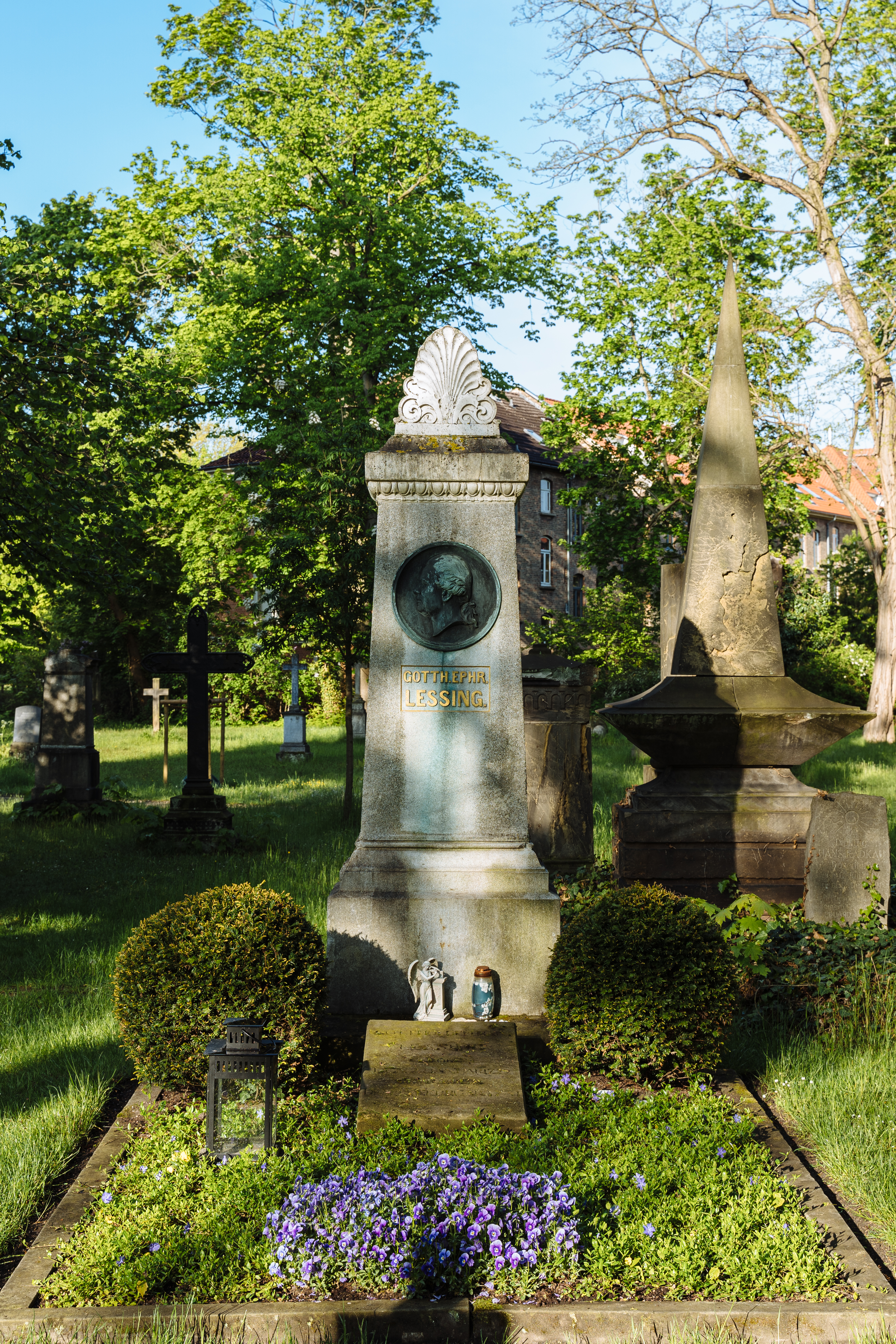
Grave, Brunswick

In his religious and philosophical writings he defended the faithful Christian's right for freedom of thought. He argued against the belief in revelation and the holding on to a literal interpretation of the Bible by the predominant orthodox doctrine through a problem later to be called Lessing's Ditch. Lessing outlined the concept of the religious "Proof of Power": How can miracles continue to be used as a base for Christianity when we have no proof of miracles? Historical truths which are in doubt cannot be used to prove metaphysical truths (such as God's existence). As Lessing says it: "That, then, is the ugly great ditch which I cannot cross, however often and however earnestly I have tried to make that leap."

In the final leg of his life, Lessing threw himself into an intense evaluation of theology and religion. He did much of his studying by reading manuscripts he found while working as a librarian. While working for the Duke, he formed a close friendship with a family by the name of Reimarus. The family held an unpublished manuscript by Hermann Samuel Reimarus which attacked the historicity of Christian revelation. Despite discouragement from his brother Karl Gotthelf Lessing, he began publishing pieces of the manuscript in pamphlets known as Fragments from an Unnamed Author. The controversial pamphlets resulted in a heated debate between him and another theologian, Johann Melchior Goeze. In concern for tarnishing his reputation, Goeze requested the government put an end to the feud, and Lessing was silenced through a law that took away his freedom from censorship.

In response, Lessing relied upon his skills as a playwright to write what is undoubtedly his most influential play, Nathan the Wise. In the play, Lessing set up tension between Judaism, Islam, and Christianity by having one character ask Nathan which religion was the most genuine. Nathan avoids the question by telling the parable of the three rings, which implies the idea that no specific religion is the "correct religion." The Enlightenment ideas to which Lessing held tight were portrayed through his "ideal of humanity," stating that religion is relative to the individual's ability to reason. Nathan the Wise is considered to be the first example of the German "literature of humanity". As a child of the Enlightenment he trusted in a "Christianity of Reason", which oriented itself by the spirit of religion. He believed that human reason (initiated by criticism and dissent) would develop, even without help by a divine revelation. In his writing The Education of Humankind (Die Erziehung des Menschengeschlechts), often translated as The Education of the Human Race, he extensively and coherently lays out his position.

The idea of freedom (for the theatre against the dominance of its French model; for religion from the church's dogma) is his central theme throughout his life. Therefore, he also stood up for the liberation of the upcoming middle and upper class from the nobility making up their minds for them. In his own literary existence he also constantly strove for independence. But his ideal of a possible life as a free author was hard to keep up against the economic constraints he faced. His project of authors self-publishing their works, which he tried to accomplish in Hamburg with C. J. Bode, failed in 1769.

Lessing is important as a literary critic for his work Laocoon: An Essay on the Limits of Painting and Poetry. In this work, he argues against the tendency to take Horace's ut pictura poesis (as painting, so poetry) as prescriptive for literature. In other words, he objected to trying to write poetry using the same devices as one would in painting. Instead, poetry and painting each has its character (the former is extended in time; the latter is extended in space). This is related to Lessing's turn from French classicism to Aristotelian mimesis, discussed above.

== Criticism by Müller ==
The Radical Pietist Johann Daniel Müller published the following anonymous book against Lessing and Reimarus:

- Johann Daniel Müller: Der Sieg der Wahrheit des Worts Gottes über die Lügen des Wolfenbüttelschen Bibliothecarii, [Gotthold] Ephraim Lessing, und seines Fragmenten-Schreibers [i. e. Hermann Samuel Reimarus] in ihren Lästerungen gegen Jesum Christum, seine Jünger, Apostel, und die ganze Bibel. 1780.
- Cf. Reinhard Breymayer: Ein unbekannter Gegner Gotthold Ephraim Lessings. Der ehemalige Frankfurter Konzertdirektor Johann Daniel Müller aus Wissenbach/Nassau (1716 bis nach 1785), Alchemist im Umkreis [Johann Wolfgang] Goethes, Kabbalist, separatistischer Chiliast, Freund der Illuminaten von Avignon ("Elias / Elias Artista") Dietrich Meyer (Ed.): Pietismus – Herrnhutertum – Erweckungsbewegung. Festschrift für Erich Beyreuther. Köln [Pulheim-Brauweiler] and Bonn 1982 (Schriftenreihe des Vereins für Rheinische Kirchengeschichte, volume 70), pp. 109–145, and p. 108 Silhouette of [Johann] Daniel Müller.

== Selected works ==
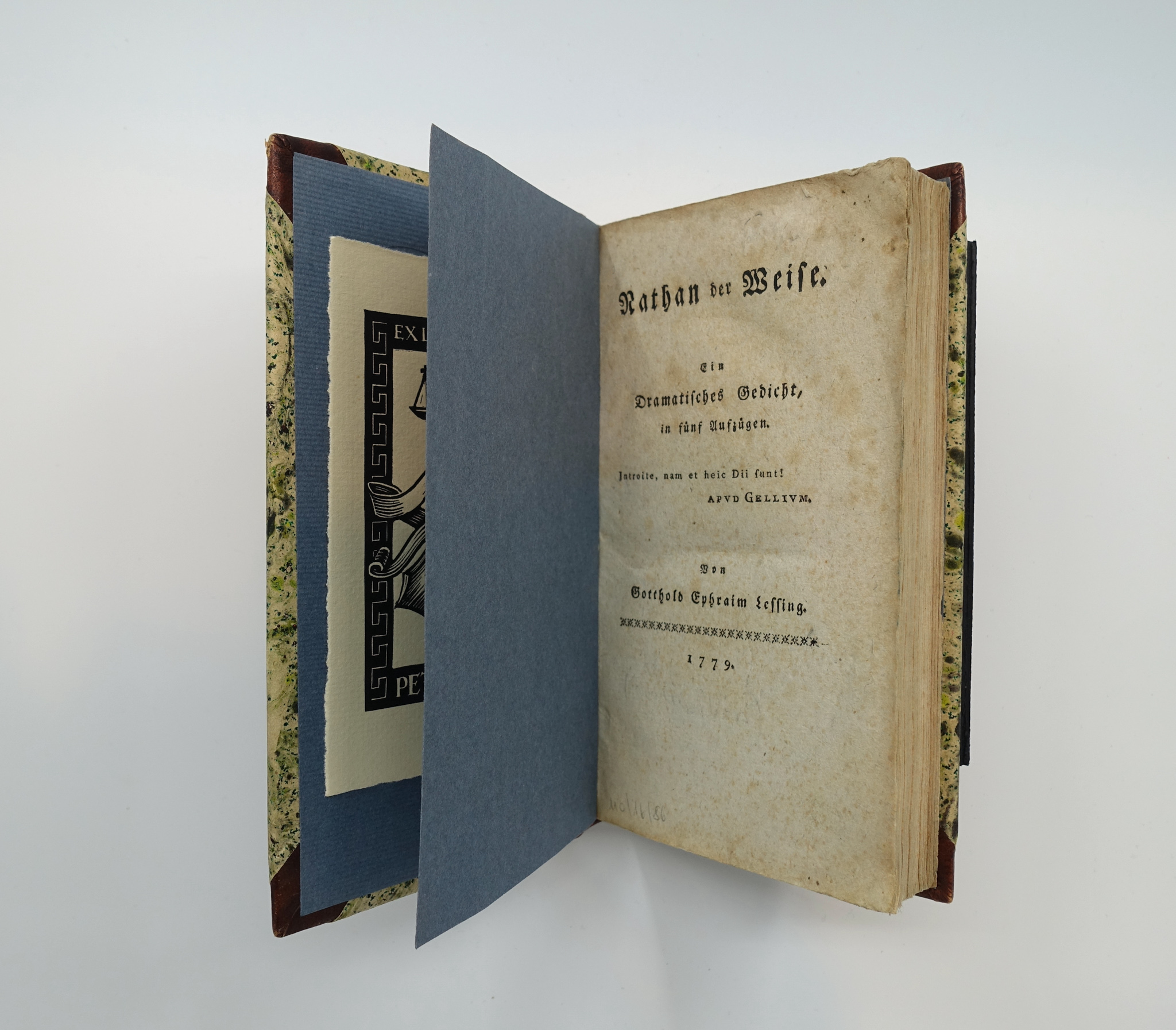
- Second edition of Nathan the Wise in its first year of publication 1779. In the Jewish Museum of Switzerland's collection.
  Der junge Gelehrte (The Young Scholar) (1748)
- Der Freigeist (The Freethinker) (1749)
- Die Juden (The Jews) (1749)
- Miss Sara Sampson (1755)
- Philotas (1759)
- Fabeln (Fables) (1759)
- Laokoön oder Über die Grenzen der Malerei und Poesie (Laocoön) (1767)
- Minna von Barnhelm (Minna of Barnhelm) (1767)
- Hamburgische Dramaturgie (1767–69)
- Emilia Galotti (1772)
- Anti-Goeze (1778) (written against Johann Melchior Goeze, pastor in Hamburg)
- Nathan der Weise (Nathan the Wise) (1779)
- Ernst und Falk – Gespräche für Freymäurer (1776–1778)
- Die Erziehung des Menschengeschlechts (The Education of the Human Race) (1780)

=== English translations ===
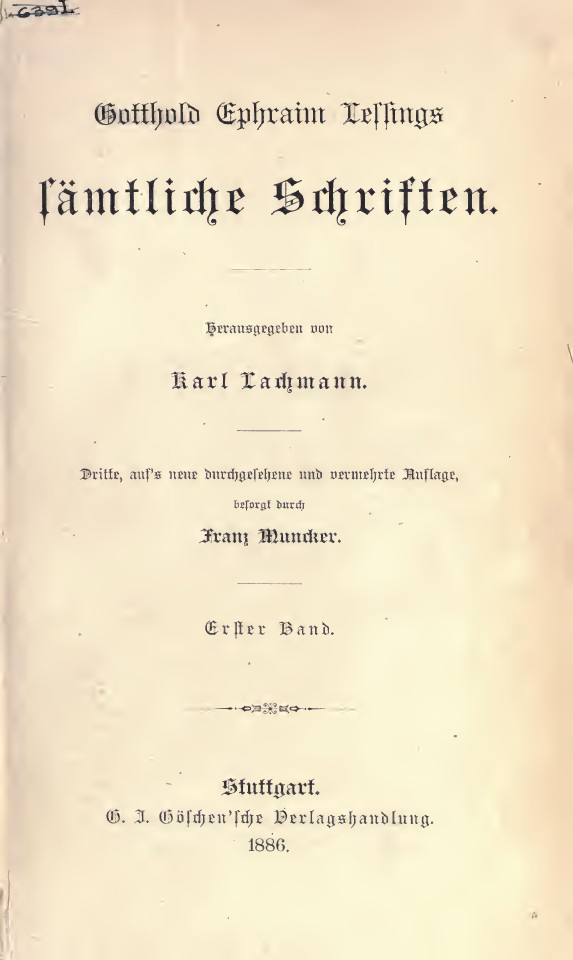
An 1886 edition of Lessing's collected works

- Fables and epigrams. London, Printed for J.& H.L. Hunt, 1825.
- Laocoon: or, The limits of Poetry and Painting, translated by William Ross. London, Ridgeway, 1836.
- Nathan the Wise: a dramatic poem in five acts, translated by Adolph Reich. London, A. W. Bennett, 1860.
- Nathan, the Wise. A dramatic poem of five acts, translated by Dr. Isidor Kalisch. New York, Waldheimer & Zenn, 1869.
- The Education of the Human Race, translated by Fred W. Robertson, M.A.. London, C.K. Paul & Co., 1881.
- Plays of Lessing: Nathan the Wise and Minna von Barnhelm, translated by Ernest Bell. London, G. Bell, 1888.
- Selected prose works of G. E. Lessing, translated by E. C. Beasley, B. A., and Helen Zimmern. London, G. Bell and sons, 1890.
- Lessing’s Emilia Galotti, with footnotes and vocabulary; New York, Hinds & Noble, 1899.
- Lessing’s Nathan der Weise, with footnotes and vocabulary. New York, Hinds & Noble, 1899.
- Laocoon. An essay upon the limits of painting and poetry: With remarks illustrative of various points in the history of ancient art, translated by Ellen Frothingham. Boston, Little, Brown, 1904.
- Laocoon, translated by Sir Robert Phillimore, London, G. Routledge & sons, 1905.
- Minna von Barnhelm, edited with an introduction, German questions, notes and vocabulary, by Philip Schuyler Allen. New York, Charles E. Merrill Co., 1907.
- Minna von Barnhelm; or, Soldier’s fortune translated by Otto Heller. New York, H. Holt and company, 1917.
- Nathan the Wise; a dramatic poem in five acts, translated and edited by Leo Markun. Girard, Kan., Haldeman-Julius Co., 1926.
- Laocoon, Nathan the Wise, Minna von Barnhelm, translated by William A. Steel. London, J. M. Dent & sons, ltd.; New York, E. P. Dutton & co., inc., 1930.
- Nathan the Wise, translated by Berthold August Eisenlohr. Ann Arbor, Mich., Lithoprinted by Edwards Brothers, inc., 1942.
- Nathan the Wise, translated by Guenther Reinhardt. Brooklyn, Barron's Educational Series, inc., 1950.
- Nathan the Wise; a dramatic poem in five acts, translated into English verse by Bayard Quincy Morgan. New York, Ungar, 1955.
- Theological Writings; Selections in Translation with an Introductory Essay, by Henry Chadwick. London, A. & C. Black, 1956.
- Lessing's Theological Writings. Selections in Translation, edited by Henry Chadwick. Stanford: Stanford University Press, 1957.
- Emilia Galotti: a tragedy in five acts, translated by Anna Johanna Gode von Aesch. Great Neck, N.Y., Barron's Educational Series, inc., 1959.
- Emilia Galotti, a tragedy in five acts, translated by Edward Dvoretzky. New York, Ungar, 1962, reprinted German Book Center, 2003.
- Hamburg dramaturgy, translated by Victor Lange. New York, Dover Publications, 1962. Reprint of Helen Zimmern's 1890 translation.
- Laocoon: an essay on the limits of painting and poetry, translated by Edward Allen McCormick. Indianapolis, Bobbs-Merrill, 1962.
- Minna von Barnhelm: a comedy in five acts, translated by Kenneth J. Northcott. Chicago, University of Chicago Press [1972]
- Nathan the Wise, Minna von Barnhelm, and Other Plays and Writings, edited by Peter Demetz with a foreword by Hannah Arendt. New York: Continuum, 1991.
- Nathan the Wise, with Related Documents, translated, edited, and with an introduction by Ronald Schechter. Boston/New York: Bedford/St. Martin's, 2004.
- Philosophical and Theological Writings, edited by H. B. Nisbet. Cambridge: Cambridge University Press, 2005.

== See also ==
- Fable
- Greek revival
- Lessing Monument, Tiergarten, Berlin
- Lessing Theater
- Pantheism controversy
