= Abel Seyler =

Swiss-born theatre director (1730–1800)

- A silhouette of Abel Seyler
- Born: 23 August 1730; Liestal, Switzerland
- Died: 25 April 1800 (aged 69); Rellingen, Duchy of Holstein, Holy Roman Empire
- Era: Age of Enlightenment
- Known for: Banker (Seyler & Tillemann) and theatre principal (Hamburg National Theatre and Seyler Theatre Company)
- Spouses: Sophie Elisabeth Andreae; Friederike Sophie Seyler
- Children: Abel Seyler the Younger; L.E. Seyler; Sophie Leisewitz

Abel Seyler (23 August 1730, Liestal – 25 April 1800, Rellingen) was a Swiss-born theatre director and former merchant banker, who was regarded as one of the great theatre principals of 18th century Europe. He played a pivotal role in the development of German theatre and opera, and was considered "the leading patron of German theatre" in his lifetime. He supported the development of new works and experimental productions, helping to establish Hamburg as a center of theatrical innovation and to establish a publicly funded theater system in Germany. Working with some of Germany's foremost actors and playwrights of his era, he is credited with pioneering a new more realist style of acting, introducing Shakespeare to a German language audience, and with promoting the concept of a national theatre in the tradition of Ludvig Holberg, the Sturm und Drang playwrights, and serious German opera, becoming the "primary agent for change in the German opera scene" in the late 18th century. Already in his lifetime, he was described as "one of German art's most meritorious men."

The son of a Basel Reformed priest, Seyler moved to London and then to Hamburg as a young adult, and established himself as a merchant banker in the 1750s. During the Seven Years' War and its immediate aftermath his bank Seyler & Tillemann engaged in an ever-increasing and complex, "malicious" speculation with financial instruments and went spectacularly bankrupt with enormous debts in the wake of the Amsterdam banking crisis of 1763, resulting in a decade of expansive litigation. Although they were wealthy bankers, Seyler and his business partner were "in no way representatives of the Hamburg bourgeoisie." A flamboyant bon vivant who was regarded with suspicion in Hamburg, Seyler symbolized a new and more aggressive form of capitalism.

Seyler's admiration for the tragic actress Sophie Hensel (Seyler), who later became his second wife, led him to devote himself entirely to theatre from 1767 onwards. He used his remaining funds to become the main shareholder, benefactor and effective leader of the idealistic Hamburg National Theatre, that became a leading cultural institution in Germany. His theatre employed Lessing as the world's first dramaturg, culminating in the work Hamburg Dramaturgy that defined the field and gave it its name. In 1769, Seyler founded the travelling Seyler Theatre Company, which became one of the most famous theatre companies of Europe during the period 1769–79 and regarded as "the best theatre company in Germany at that time." The company was to a large degree centered around his would-be wife and his close collaborator Konrad Ekhof, Germany's most famous actress and actor at the time, respectively. He initially held the Hanoverian privilege as theatre director and his company later stayed for three years at the court of Duchess Anna Amalia in Weimar and for a year at the ducal court in Gotha. His company's arrival in Weimar is regarded as the earliest starting point of Weimar Classicism. From 1779 to 1781 he was the founding artistic director of the Mannheim National Theatre. He commissioned works such as Sturm und Drang by Klinger (which gave its name to the era), Ariadne auf Naxos by Benda and Alceste by Schweitzer, considered "the first serious German opera."

Seyler mostly focused on the artistic, economic and administrative management of his theatrical company; his own lack of a background as an actor and his former profession as a merchant banker, made him stand out among the theatre principals of his era in a profession that was just starting to gain respectability. In this sense, Seyler occupies a transitional position in the history of theatre leadership. Neither an actor-manager in the traditional sense nor a court-appointed patron, he anticipated the later separation of managerial, artistic, and directing functions that would become characteristic of the modern theatre director and producer. His wife's 1789 Singspiel Huon and Amanda (or Oberon), set to new music by Paul Wranitzky, was performed by Emanuel Schikaneder's theater troupe and by the Weimar court theater under the direction of Goethe, and was a major influence on The Magic Flute, establishing the Schikaneder theatre's tradition of fairy tale operas. The principal founder of biochemistry and molecular biology, Felix Hoppe-Seyler, was an adopted son of his grandson.

== Background and childhood ==
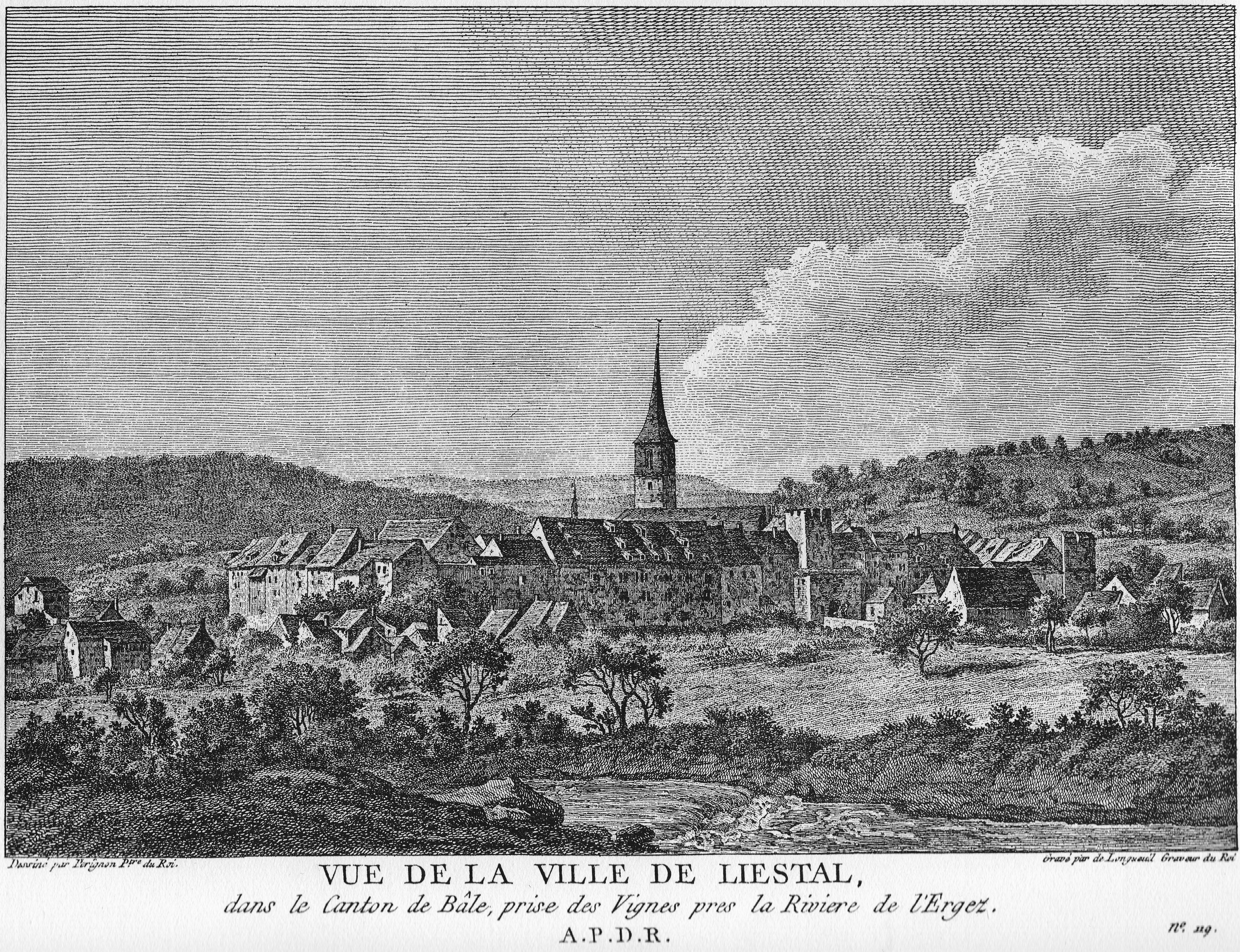
His birthplace Liestal in Switzerland (1780)

Abel Seyler was born in 1730 in Liestal outside Basel in Switzerland. He was the son of the Reformed clergyman, Dr.theol. Abel Seyler (Seiler) (the elder) (1684–1767), who was parish priest of Frenkendorf-Munzach in Liestal from 1714 to 1763, and Anna Katharina Burckhardt (1694–1773). He grew up in a learned and pious Reformed family and was descended from or closely related to all of the most prominent patrician families of Basel on both his parents' sides. His mother belonged to the noted Burckhardt family, that was considered the most powerful family in the canton of Basel during the 17th and early 18th century. He was a paternal grandson of the theologian Friedrich Seyler and Elisabeth Socin, a member of an Italian-origined noble family, and he was named for his great-grandfather, the Basel judge and envoy to the French court Abel Socin (1632–1695). He was also descended from the Merian and Faesch families. He was a matrilineal descendant of Justina Froben, daughter of the humanist Johann Froben; he thus belonged to the same matriline as Anna Catharina Bischoff. He had a sister, Elisabeth Seiler (1715–1798), married to parish priest Daniel Merian. He was distantly related to Cardinal Joseph Fesch, Napoleon's uncle; they were both descended from the Basel silk merchant, politician and diplomat Johann Rudolf Faesch (died 1659), who was Burgomaster of Basel and led the city's pro-French faction.

Although his parents belonged to families that were highly respected in Basel, Abel Seyler grew up in rather modest material circumstances. His father's congregation was small, and the parish church and rectory were in poor condition. His father also failed in his attempt to have the church restored. As a parish priest, his father did not have a fixed income but presumably lived off payments for church services, gifts and occasional government contributions. It was only when he retired in 1763 that his father received a fixed income, a pension of 600 pounds.

Ancestors of Abel Seyler

Friedrich Seyler (1603–1676), Magister, parish priest, rector of the Basel Gymnasium
Friedrich Seyler (1642–1708), theologian and parish priest
Rosina Stöcklin (1612–1681)
Abel Seyler (1684–1767), Dr.theol, parish priest
Abel Socin (1632–1695), Basel law lord and grand councillor, envoy to the French court
Elisabeth Socin
Maria Hummel (1635–1681)
Abel Seyler
Samuel Burckhardt (1623–1685)
Johann Rudolf Burckhardt (1671–1698)
Katharina Parcus (1624–1685)
Anna Katharina Burckhardt (1694–1773)
Johann Jakob Merian (1648–1724)
Anna Maria Merian (1671–1698)
Susanna Faesch (1651–1682)

== Seyler as a merchant banker ==
As a young man, Seyler left Basel first for London and then for Hamburg, where he was active as a merchant banker until 1766. At the time Hamburg was emerging as one of the world's foremost centres of trade and finance, a position it would retain until the end of the 18th century. With his business partners Johann Martin Tillemann and Edwin Müller, he founded the related companies Seyler & Tillemann and Müller & Seyler, which engaged in an ever-increasing and complex speculation with financial instruments during the Seven Years' War in the 1750s and early 1760s. Seyler & Tillemann had close ties to the bank of the brothers De Neufville in Amsterdam, and has been considered one of the most speculative and immoral banks of the era. In 1761 Seyler & Tillemann, acting as agents for their close business associate Heinrich Carl von Schimmelmann, leased the mint factory in Rethwisch from the impoverished Frederick Charles, Duke of Schleswig-Holstein-Sonderburg-Plön, a member of a cadet branch of the Danish royal family, to produce debased coins in the final years of the Seven Years' War. Seyler & Tillemann went bankrupt in the wake of the Amsterdam banking crisis of 1763 with 3–4 million Mark Banco in debts, an enormous sum. Expansive civil litigation relating to the bankruptcy was initiated in 1763 and went on until 1773, and the case reached the Imperial Cameral Tribunal. Much criticism was directed at Seyler and Tillemann's business ethics and extravagant lifestyle.

Mary Lindemann notes, quoting from the 1765–1773 Imperial Cameral Tribunal proceedings and the memoirs of John Parish:

[An] important case against several business partners reached the Imperial Cameral Tribunal (Reichskammergericht) in 1765. It offers an excellent perspective on "deceitful schemes" and especially on the bill-jobbing of two companies: Müller & Seyler and Seyler & Tillemann. Although the voices presented here are those of their creditors, the documents nonetheless reveal how contemporaries viewed the business practices of "malicious bankrupts" and how these practices assumed particularly baleful shapes in their minds. The creditors’ lawyers laid out the background to the case in considerable detail. Müller and Seyler were new men; Edwin Müller had come from Hanover several years before and Abel Seyler had been born in one of the Swiss cantons. Both had, however, "learned their business" and married in Hamburg. (Note: Seyler had in fact married in Hanover, although he either already lived in Hamburg or settled there shortly afterwards) "If one could trust their books," their actual starting capital amounted to no more than thirty-eight thousand Mk. Bco., "of which, however, well over half had been frittered away through the acquisition of furniture for two households, [for the purchase of] clothes, jewels, silver plate, and other needs for themselves, their wives, and their children, [and also for] carriages, horses, and so on." Their business was undercapitalized from the beginning. In the 1750s, this seemed a minor problem because credit was easy to obtain. When the cash flow failed, they tried to acquire money quickly through bill-jobbing. Because their ready funds could not cover their expenses and debts, theirs became "the most audacious [form of] Windhandel." As their business increased—as they took on ever more commissions in goods for import and export, invested in a sugar refinery, and lent money to several people—they simultaneously pursued their bill-jobbing and expanded it markedly.

In 1757, they acquired a new partner, named Tillemann, who, however, contributed "not one Creutzer" to their capital, but that did not stop them from vigorously extending their business. Although their enterprises seemed to prosper in the late 1750s, they did so only "at the expense of others [...] because they always lacked adequate funds.” Bill-jobbing was a dangerous game “in which even the most careful [practitioner] usually loses about 10% and sometimes even 12–14%.” The partners then conjured up a fictive company under Erwin Müller’s signature “and informed the world that he had thus established his own firm.” Certainly, commented the lawyer drily, “that was a fine business that honored its inventor, which, however, no one who values truth and honesty could condone!”

They were effectively bankrupt by August 1762, long before the “great crash” of 1763. Yet they did not stop, but plunged forward (as Parish wrote), cooking more deals as the kitchen got hotter. Seyler & Tillemann continued their trade in worthless paper and bought up large quantities of silver and coin on commission. Müller, by now separated from the firm, was up to his ears in this “windy-business” (“he had strewn into the world some one-and-a-half million Mk. Bco. in bills”). He was brought to such “despair” that Seyler & Tillemann, as well as several other local and foreign banks and businesses (principally in Braunschweig and Amsterdam), all of which were mutually involved in bill-jobbing and bill-discounting, had to come to his rescue. For their own preservation, they simply could not afford to let him fall. Still, by late 1762 they, too, were “completely insolvent.”

When the Amsterdam house of De Neufville collapsed, so, too, tumbled Seyler & Tillemann. The common cause of the bankruptcies, from the giant De Neufville to less-famed partnerships like Seyler & Tillemann, lay, it was argued, in “an exaggerated trade in bills of exchange, in bill-jobbing, and—particularly—in the criminal “‘windy trade’ that [such like] Seyler & Tillemann had engaged in.” The “wind trade” of these years—and the bankruptcies that resulted—shook the major commercial centers to the core, “and many a capitalist who sought to profit from the high discount rate and who changed his money into paper, was plucked bare.”

Seyler was described as "a handsome bon vivant." Despite suffering "a sensational bankruptcy for an enormous sum [...] neither of them [Seyler and Tillemann] had lost his good humour or his taste for light living." Although they were wealthy bankers, Seyler and Tillemann were "in no way representatives of the Hamburg bourgeoisie, but were rather seen with suspicion for different reasons" by the local Hamburg elite. In strictly Lutheran Hamburg, Calvinists such as Seyler were viewed with as much suspicion as Catholics at the time. Seyler and his friends were also self-made men, immigrants to Hamburg and showed little regard for the values and conventions of the conservative Hamburg bourgeoisie; they symbolized a new form of capitalism.

== Seyler as a theatre principal ==
=== Hamburg National Theatre (1767–1769) ===
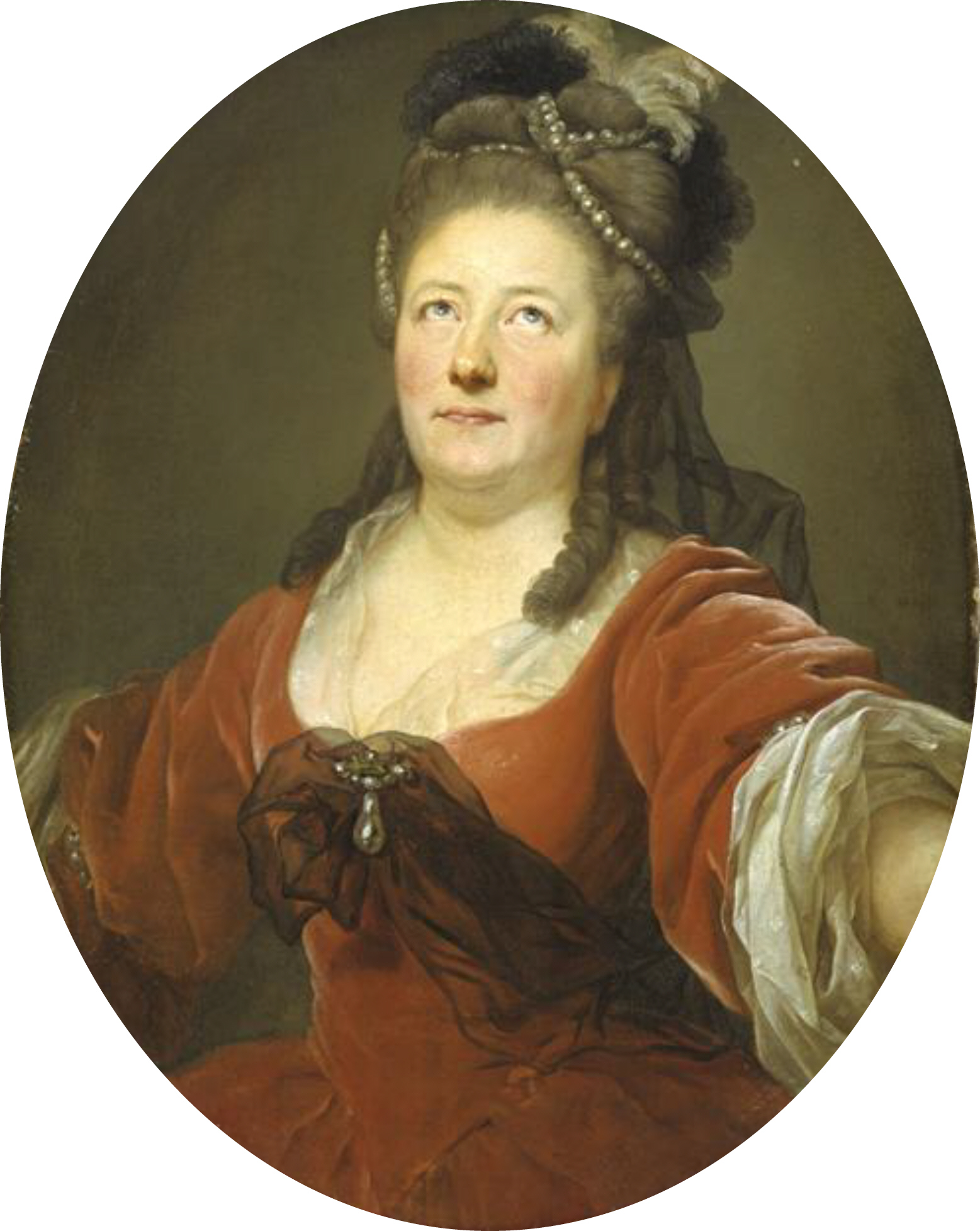
His second wife Friederike Sophie Seyler, Germany's most famous actress of the late 18th century, painted by Anton Graff

After the bankruptcy of his bank, Seyler devoted himself to theatre and became the main shareholder, benefactor and effective leader of the Hamburg National Theatre, an idealistic attempt to establish a national theatre based on the ideas of Ludvig Holberg. The theatre was owned by "a consortium of twelve businessmen of the city, with a triumvirate of Seyler, Bubbers and Johann Martin Tillemann, Seyler's business partner. But in practice, it was a one man affair, as Seyler dominated all." It leased the Comödienhaus building and was largely a successor institution of Konrad Ernst Ackermann's theatre company. The National Theatre employed Gotthold Ephraim Lessing as the world's first dramaturg, and attracted eminent actors such as Konrad Ekhof and Friedrich Ludwig Schröder; Germany's most famous actress of the late 18th century Friederike Sophie Hensel (Seyler), who later became Seyler's second wife, was the theatre's lead actress. She was regarded as "a very fine actress, as Lessing admitted, but she was a troublesome and tempestuous character," always at the centre of intrigue. It was largely Seyler's admiration for Friederike Sophie Hensel, by then 29, that led him to devote himself to theatre; as a result of Hensel's rivalry with Karoline Schulze, she was at the centre of an intrigue that led her admirer Seyler to "establish a theatre for her, where she could reign undisputed without fearing any rivalry."

Karl Mantzius noted:

Seyler's admiration for the fine actress was easily transferred to the theatre in general, the theatre, that is, which formed a frame round his favourite. Thus a coalition of commerce, letters, and art was formed in which each party had his own personal interests, but which outwardly was working towards the sublime goal of abolishing the business-like leadership that was detrimental to true art.

Nominally Johann Friedrich Löwen served as theatre director, but he had little influence, as Seyler as main shareholder and head of a three-member "administrative committee" (Verwaltungsausschuß) took all managerial decisions while Ekhof in practice assumed the artistic leadership. The new Seyler regime suited Ekhof well, and he became a lifelong friend and collaborator of Seyler.

The Hamburg National Theatre was immortalized by Lessing's influential book Hamburg Dramaturgy, a collection of essays that reflected on the Hamburg National Theatre's efforts, and which defined the field of dramaturgy and gave it its name. The idea of a journal with Lessing as a dramatic critic was conceived by Löwen, and Seyler, "the power behind the throne," at first reluctantly agreed, but was eventually won over by the journal's success. The theatre had to close after two years after Seyler had spent the rest of his fortune on it.

=== Seyler Theatre Company (1769–1779) ===
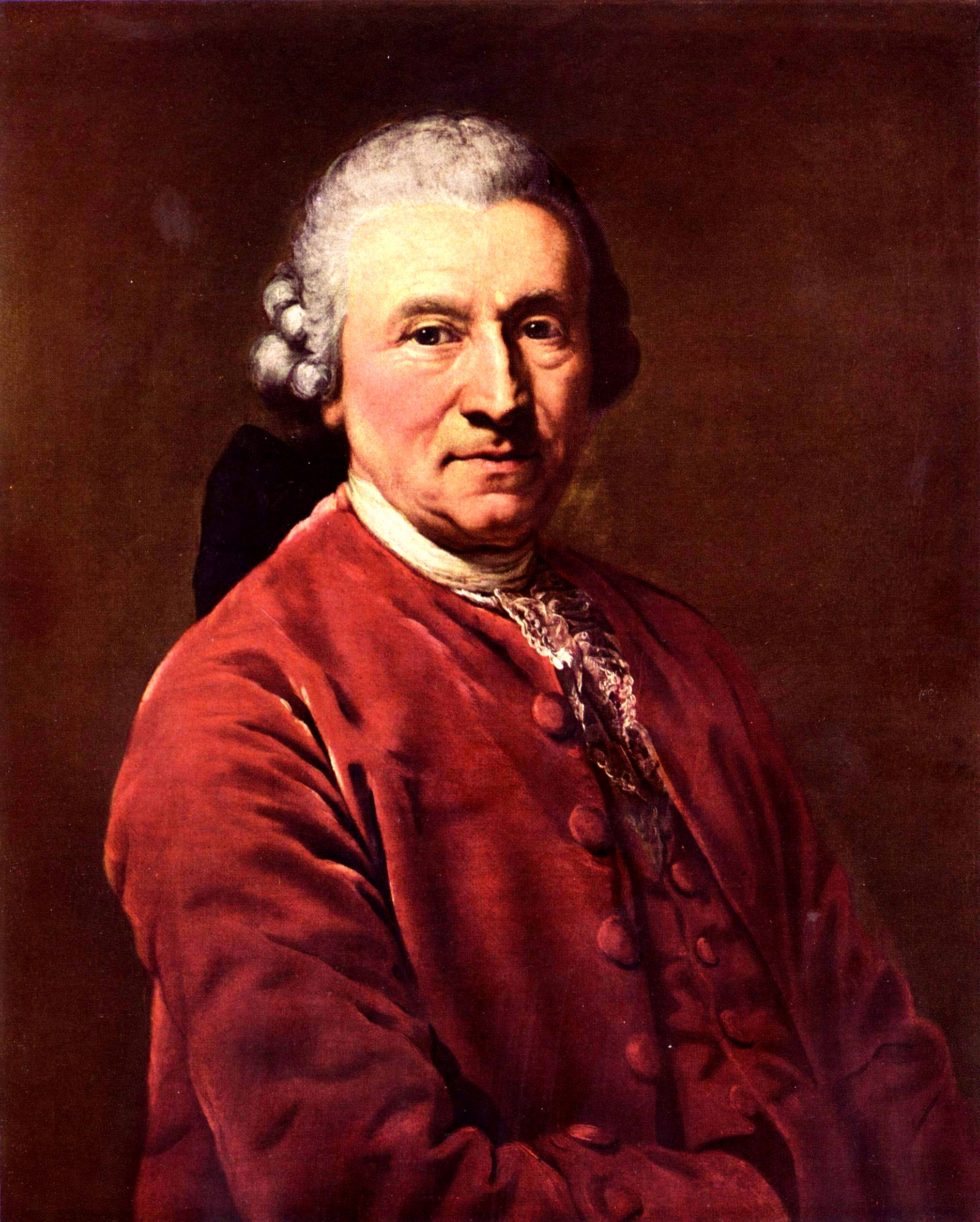
Seyler's long-time collaborator, the actor Konrad Ekhof, regarded as Germany's finest actor of the 18th century

In 1769 Seyler founded the National Theatre's effective successor, the Seyler Theatre Company, together with Konrad Ekhof, Sophie Hensel and some other actors. The Seyler Company became one of the most famous theatre companies of Europe during the period 1769–79 and was regarded as "the best theatre company in Germany at that time." While the National Theatre had avoided musical theatre, Seyler appointed Anton Schweitzer as music director, charged with adding opera to the spoken repertory, and the Seyler Company came to play a major role both in the development of a German opera tradition and in the promotion and popularisation of the Sturm und Drang dramas.

For most of its existence, the Seyler Company comprised around 60 members, and included an orchestra, a ballet, house dramatists and set designers. The company was one of the first theatre companies to maintain a permanent orchestra. Over the next ten years the company travelled extensively, and stayed for longer periods at several courts of Europe. Theatre companies of the era, especially travelling ones, thought of themselves as extended "families."

==== Hanover years (1769–1771) ====
George III of Hanover and the United Kingdom contracted Seyler in 1769 with performing at Hanover and other cities of the Electorate of Hanover, appointing him as "Director of the Royal and Electoral German Court Actors," a privilege he held until relinquishing it in 1772. During the Hanover years the company performed in Hanover itself and in Lüneburg, Celle, Osnabrück, Hildesheim und Wetzlar between September 1769 and October 1771. Initially the new company struggled and Seyler failed to replicate the old success of the Hamburg National Theatre. The lack of public interest in Hanover led to financial problems and when Ekhof in May 1770 also became seriously ill and unable to perform for some time, the situation worsened dramatically. Seyler's brother-in-law, the court pharmacist J.G.R. Andreae from Hanover, who also raised Seyler's children from his first marriage, saved the Seyler Company by the assumption of all debts before the impending ruin; Andreae however demanded that Ekhof replaced his brother-in-law as head of the company.

==== At the court of Duchess Anna Amalia (1771–1774) ====
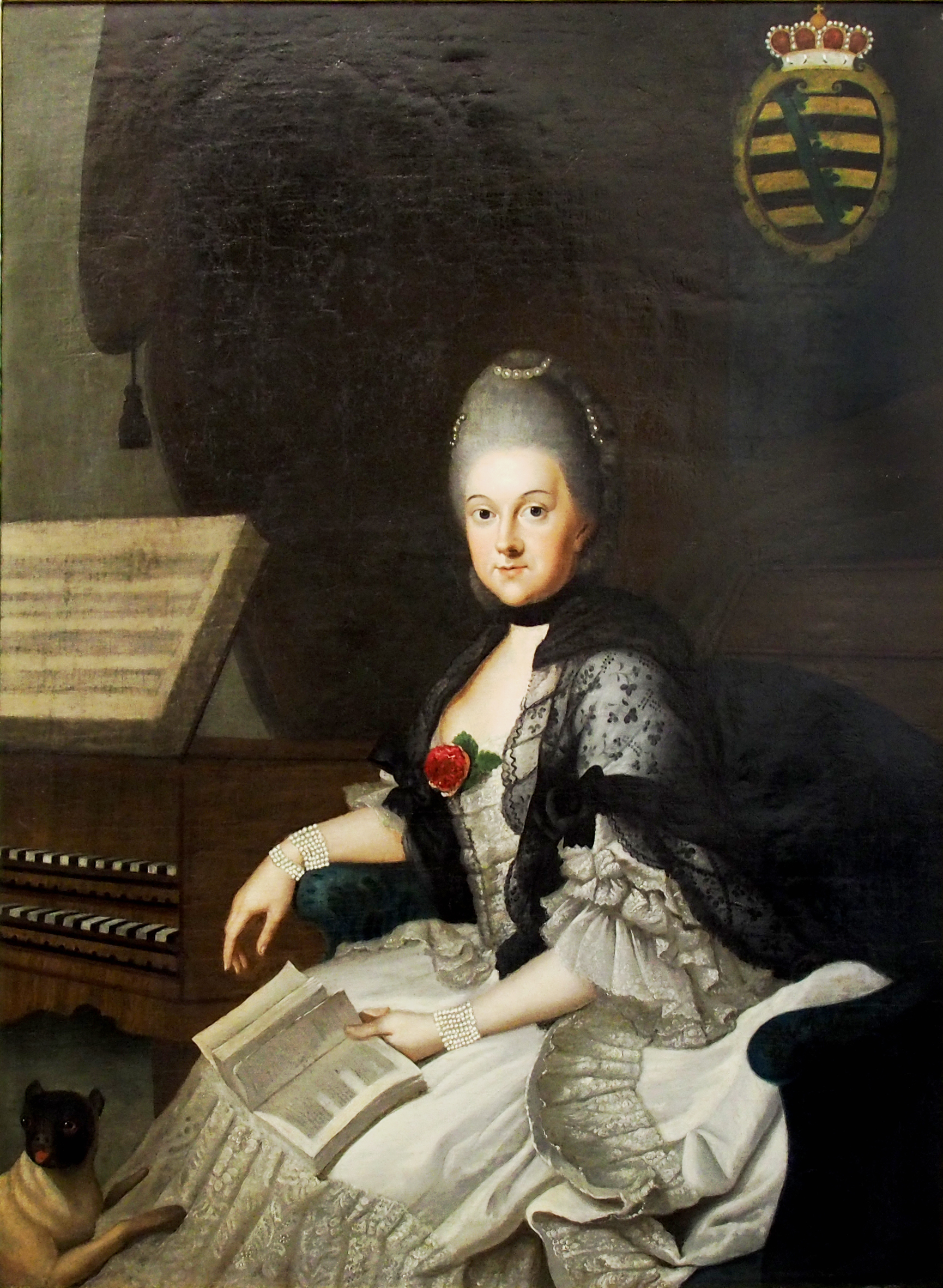
Duchess Anna Amalia, noted patron of the arts, who invited Seyler and his company to her court in 1771

In 1771 the Seyler Company was invited to the ducal court in Weimar by Duchess Anna Amalia, the composer and noted patron of the arts, and Seyler again became the company's principal. They were warmly welcomed by Anna Amalia and her court in October 1771, and were generously paid; the company performed three times a week for select guests at the Weimar ducal court. In 1771 Anna Amalia was a 32-year old widow who reigned as regent on behalf of her young son. The Seyler Company's arrival in Weimar marked the infancy of the cultural era known as the Weimar Classicism, when the Duchess invited many of the most eminent men in Germany to her court in Weimar, including Herder, Goethe and Schiller. The year after Seyler's company arrived in Weimar, the Duchess invited Christoph Martin Wieland to Weimar to educate her two sons. Wieland had just published his modern and ironic mirror-for-princes work, Der goldne Spiegel oder die Könige von Scheschian. Wieland became an important friend and collaborator of both Seyler, and later Goethe.

Adam Shoaff notes,

While in Weimar, the Seyler troupe established a reputation as one of the most formidable companies in Germany, thanks to its composer, Anton Schweitzer (1735–87); their leading soprano, Franziska Koch; [...] and two other talented singers, Josepha and Friedrich Hellmuth. Its production of Schweitzer’s Alceste (1773), with a libretto by Christoph Martin Wieland (1733–1813), marked a significant moment in German opera history: Alceste was the first full-length serious opera in German.

In 1772 he reunited with his love interest Friederike Sophie Hensel, who had stayed at the Vienna Burgtheater for the past year, and they finally married in November 1772 in Oßmannstedt just outside Weimar.

==== At the Gotha court (1774–1775) ====
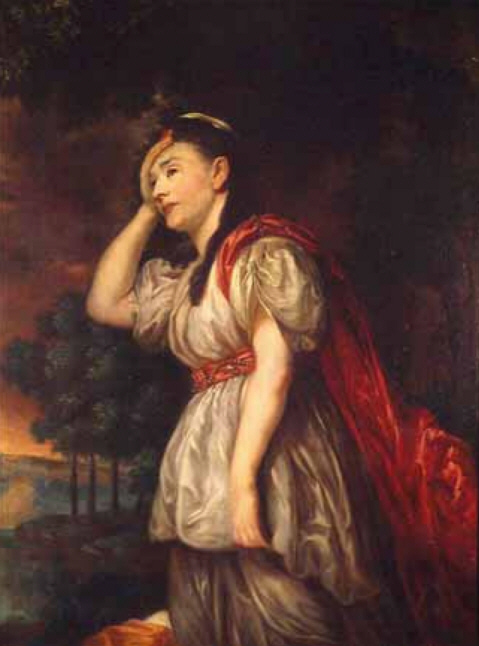
Seyler Company actress Esther Charlotte Brandes as "Ariadne" in Ariadne auf Naxos

After the palace fire in Weimar in May 1774, Anna Amalia was forced to dismiss the Seyler Company, and they left with a quarter year's wages and a letter of recommendation to Duke Ernest II in Gotha. Seyler thus missed Goethe's arrival at the Weimar court a year later. The Seyler Company remained for one year at the ducal court in Gotha, where Seyler and other of the troupe's members also involved themselves in the broader cultural and social life, and in freemasonry. In Gotha Seyler met the Bohemian composer Georg Anton Benda and commissioned him to write several successful operas, including Ariadne auf Naxos, Medea and Pygmalion. At its debut in 1775, Ariadne auf Naxos received enthusiastic reviews in Germany and afterwards, in the whole of Europe, with music critics calling attention to its originality, sweetness, and ingenious execution. It is widely considered Benda's best work, and inspired Mozart.

==== Leipzig and Dresden (1775–1777) ====
In 1775 Seyler received the Electoral Saxon privilege as theatre director and performed in Leipzig and Dresden, and in 1776 he opened a newly built summer theatre in Dresden. In 1776 Seyler also employed Goethe's close friend Friedrich Maximilian Klinger as a playwright and secretary, and he remained with the company for two years. Klinger had followed Goethe to Weimar earlier in the same year, and at the time he joined the Seyler Company he had just broken with Goethe under unclear circumstances. He brought with him the manuscript of his recently finished play Sturm und Drang, which was first performed by the Seyler Company on 1 April 1777 in Leipzig; the play gave its name to the artistic movement Sturm und Drang.

==== On the road again (1777–1779) ====
In 1777 Seyler relinquished the Electoral Saxon privilege and his company took to the road again. Over the next two years the Seyler Company was primarily based in Frankfurt and Mainz and travelled extensively to Cologne, Hanau, Mannheim, Heidelberg and Bonn. On 17 June 1777 Seyler became director of the electoral Komödienhaus at Große Bleiche in Mainz; his ensemble then consisted of around 200 members, including his wife Sophie. Frankfurt became the Seyler Company’s final stop. Reinhard Frost writes that the Seyler Company, with its literarily ambitious program, did not reach the broad audience in Frankfurt, which was accustomed to more popular entertainment. Seyler is nevertheless regarded as the founder of a serious theater tradition in Frankfurt.

=== Mannheim National Theatre (1779–1781) ===
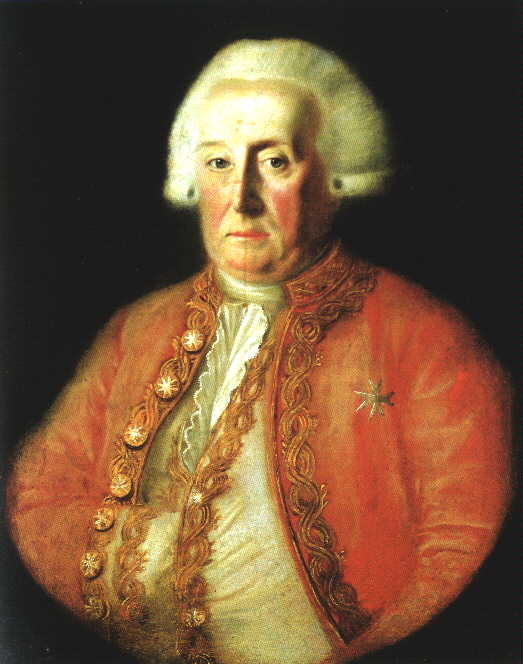
The courtier Wolfgang Heribert von Dalberg, Seyler's collaborator during the Mannheim years

When Charles Theodore, the Prince-Elector of the Electoral Palatinate, additionally became the Duke of Bavaria in 1777, he moved his court from the Palatine capital of Mannheim to Munich and brought the theatre company of Theobald Marchand with him. In 1778 he instructed the courtier Wolfgang Heribert von Dalberg—the brother of Prince-Elector and Grand Duke Karl Theodor von Dalberg—to establish a new theatre in Mannheim. At first Dalberg contracted Abel Seyler's theatre company with performing in Mannheim on an occasional basis from 1778 to 1779. In the autumn of 1779 Seyler moved permanently to Mannheim with the remaining members of his theatre company. Several actors who had been affiliated with the Gotha Court Theatre under Konrad Ekhof's direction in the past few years—essentially an offshoot of the Seyler Theatre Company—also joined him; Ekhof himself had died the previous year. The Mannheim National Theatre opened in October 1779 with Seyler as its first artistic director (Note: His formal title was Direktor, but he was also referred to as Regisseur) and Dalberg as its general administrator. (Note: Intendant) Some of the actors who worked under Seyler's direction at Mannheim were August Wilhelm Iffland, Johann David Beil and Heinrich Beck.

At Mannheim Seyler directed several Shakespeare productions, and left a lasting legacy. His "repertoire in the early Mannheim years still shows the influence of his Hamburg period as well as the legacy of the Weimar/Gotha years." In cooperation with Dalberg he developed the theatre's characteristic style, based on a belief in the need to achieve a balance between a more natural style of playing and a certain nobility and idealisation.

In 1778 Wolfgang Amadeus Mozart visited the Mannheim theatre, where Dalberg asked him to write a duodrama for the Seyler company. Mozart wrote enthusiastically to his father Leopold Mozart:

I may be able to earn 40 louis d'or here, though I'd have to remain here for 6 weeks, or 2 months at the most. The Seyler company is here—I expect you already know them by reputation

— Wolfgang Amadeus Mozart

Abel Seyler was forced to leave his position as director of the Mannheim National Theatre in 1781, "after his wife's jealousy had provoked an unfortunate incident;" during a quarrel with his wife's "scheming" student, the 20-year old actress Elisabeth Toscani, the usually level-headed Seyler lost his temper and gave her a slap in the face in response to repeated insolent remarks during theatre rehearsals. A report commissioned by Dalberg noted that Toscani belonged to "the weaker sex" and that Seyler was the director of a theatre company and should be held to a higher standard. In order to "restore the peace" of the theatre Dalberg decided to retire Seyler with a pension.

The first performance of Friedrich Schiller's The Robbers—itself inspired by the play Julius of Taranto by Seyler's son-in-law Johann Anton Leisewitz—took place at the Mannheim National Theatre the year after Seyler left as director.

=== Final years (1781–1800) ===
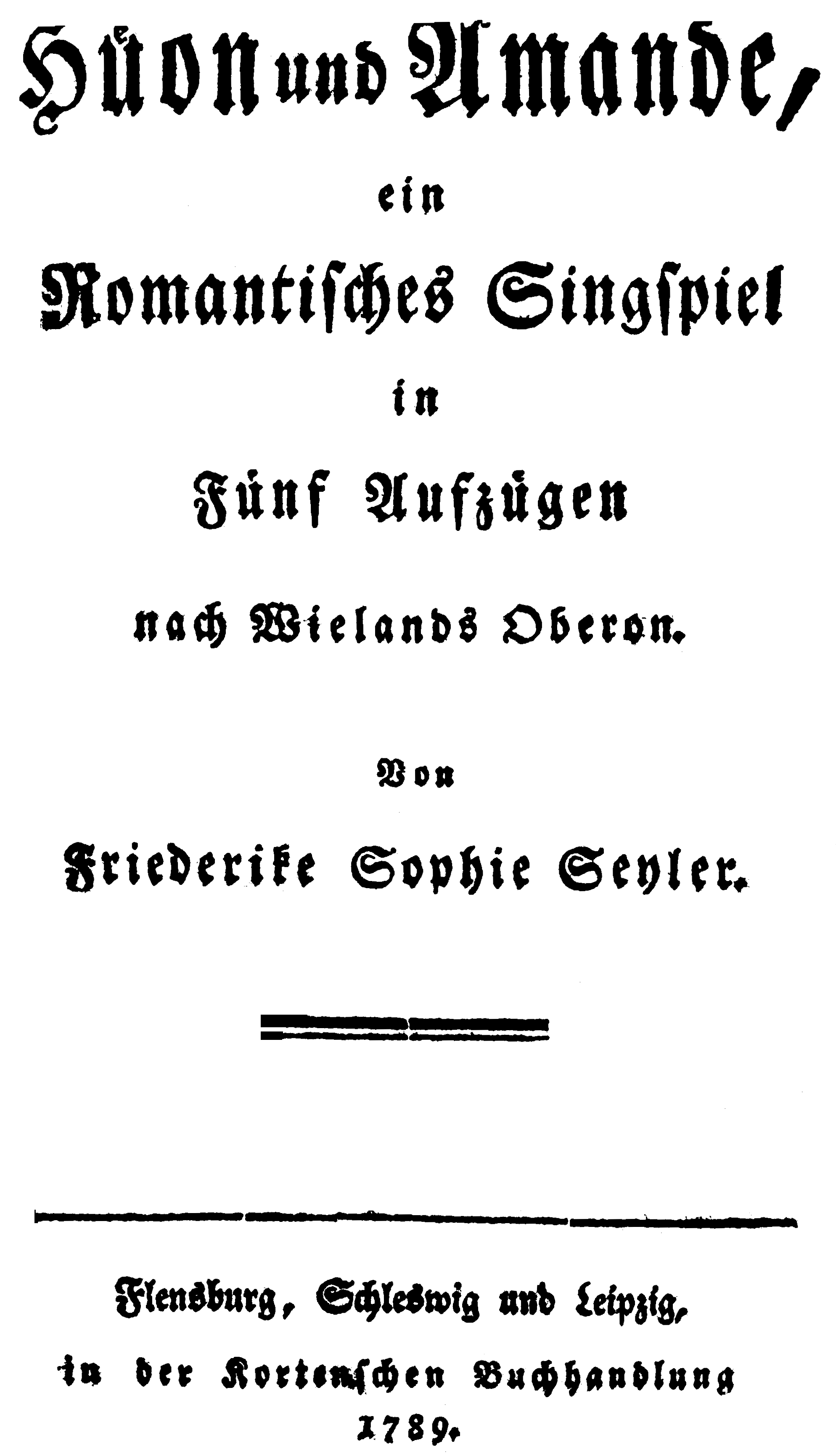
His wife Sophie Seyler's opera Huon and Amanda (or Oberon), a primary influence on the plot and characters of The Magic Flute

From 1781 to 1783 Seyler was artistic director of the Schleswig Court Theatre, which also performed in Flensburg, Husum and Kiel. In 1783 he established his own troupe based in Altona near Hamburg. From 1 September 1783 to Easter 1784 he was again director of the Comödienhaus theatre in Hamburg; he continued to live in Hamburg until 1787 and was at times a prompter at the theatre, where his wife performed under the direction of Friedrich Ludwig Schröder. From 1787 to 1792 he was again artistic director of the Schleswig Court Theatre.

His wife Sophie Seyler died in 1789. Earlier in that year she had published the romantic Singspiel or opera Huon and Amanda (or Oberon), inspired by a poem by their friend and collaborator Christoph Martin Wieland. The play, with original music by Carl Hanke, became a success in Hamburg; Hanke had been recruited by Abel Seyler as music director at the Comödienhaus in Hamburg in 1783. A lightly adapted version of Seyler's opera with new music by Paul Wranitzky became the first opera performed by Emanuel Schikaneder's troupe at the Theater auf der Wieden, and established a tradition within Schikaneder's company of fairy-tale operas that was to culminate two years later in Mozart's and Schikaneder's opera The Magic Flute; Sophie Seyler's Oberon is regarded as one of the primary influences on the plot and characters of The Magic Flute. Musicologist Thomas Bauman describes Oberon as "an important impulse for the creation of a generation of popular spectacles trading in magic and the exotic. Die Zauberflöte [The Magic Flute] in particular shares many features with Oberon, musical as well as textual."

In 1792 Abel Seyler retired with a pension from Prince Charles of Hesse-Kassel, the royal governor of the twin duchies of Schleswig-Holstein. From 1798 he lived as a guest on the estate of the actor, his long-time friend and fellow prominent freemason Friedrich Ludwig Schröder in Rellingen in the Duchy of Holstein, where he died on 25 April 1800 at the age of 69. He was interred in Rellingen on 1 May 1800.

=== Legacy ===
Seyler is widely regarded as one of the great theatre principals of 18th century Europe and has been described as "the leading patron of German theatre" in his lifetime. He is credited with introducing Shakespeare to a German language audience, and with promoting the concept of a national theatre in the tradition of Ludvig Holberg, the Sturm und Drang playwrights, and the development of a serious German opera tradition. Already in his lifetime, he was described as "one of German art's most meritorious men." Ludwig Wollrabe called him "a man who made an immortal contribution to Germany's theater and its improvement." He was lauded by contemporaries such as Gotthold Ephraim Lessing and Christoph Martin Wieland, who described him as a "man of perception and insight." After his death his daughter Sophie Leisewitz, the wife of the poet Johann Anton Leisewitz, wrote: "It was my happy fortune, out of childish duty, to worship the man whom thousands can only admire."

Seyler mostly focused on the artistic, economic and administrative management of his theatrical company; his own lack of a background as an actor, his patrician family and his former profession as a merchant banker, made him stand out among the theatre principals of his era, in a profession that was just starting to gain respectability. John Warrack noted that:

The success of Abel Seyler's company in the post-war years was rooted in his business acumen, coupled with a flair for attracting talent, but he would not have flourished without the greater respect beginning to be accorded the travelling theatre companies in the new climate of interest in drama and hence in dramatic music.

In this sense, Seyler occupies a transitional position in the history of theatre leadership. Neither an actor-manager in the traditional sense nor a court-appointed patron, he anticipated the later separation of managerial, artistic, and directing functions that would become characteristic of the modern theatre director and producer.

The Danish critic Knud Lyne Rahbek highlighted the fact that while he had never been an actor himself, he demonstrated a great enthusiasm for and refined knowledge of the arts. The actor August Wilhelm Iffland who worked under Seyler's direction said:

His experience, his knowledge guided and shaped many artists. We learned much from his directing, his fine, conscientious, honest but never bitter criticism. Unwavering was his place between the proscenium and the first coulisse. It was praise, encouragement, reward seeing him there, a warning censure when he pocketed his lorgnette, a punishment when he left his place.

His theatrical legacy eventually overshadowed the dubious reputation he had earned as a banker in his younger years.

== Freemasonry ==
Like many of his collaborators, Seyler was a freemason. He joined freemasonry in London in 1753, became a member of the Absalom lodge in Hamburg in May 1755, and was involved with freemasonry until his death.

Abel Seyler and Konrad Ekhof, along with other members of the Seyler Company, founded the first masonic lodge in Gotha. The founding took place on 25 June 1774 in the Gasthof Zum Mohren, on the occasion of the Nativity of St John the Baptist, and Ekhof became the first Worshipful Master and Seyler the First Warden. The lodge was originally named Cosmopolit, but was renamed Zum Rautenkranz in honour of the ducal family shortly after. Its members included several members of the Seyler Company, such as Seyler, Ekhof and the composer Georg Anton Benda; the reigning Duke Ernest II of Saxe-Gotha-Altenburg and the Duke's brother, Prince August of Saxe-Gotha-Altenburg joined shortly after its establishment, as did many members of the nobility and local elite of Gotha. The lodge became a centre of the spiritual and cultural life of Gotha, and a stronghold of enlightenment and philanthropy. Many members of Seyler's lodge, notably the Duke and his brother, also became members of the Illuminati, and the Duke later offered that society's founder Adam Weishaupt asylum in Gotha.

== Personal life ==
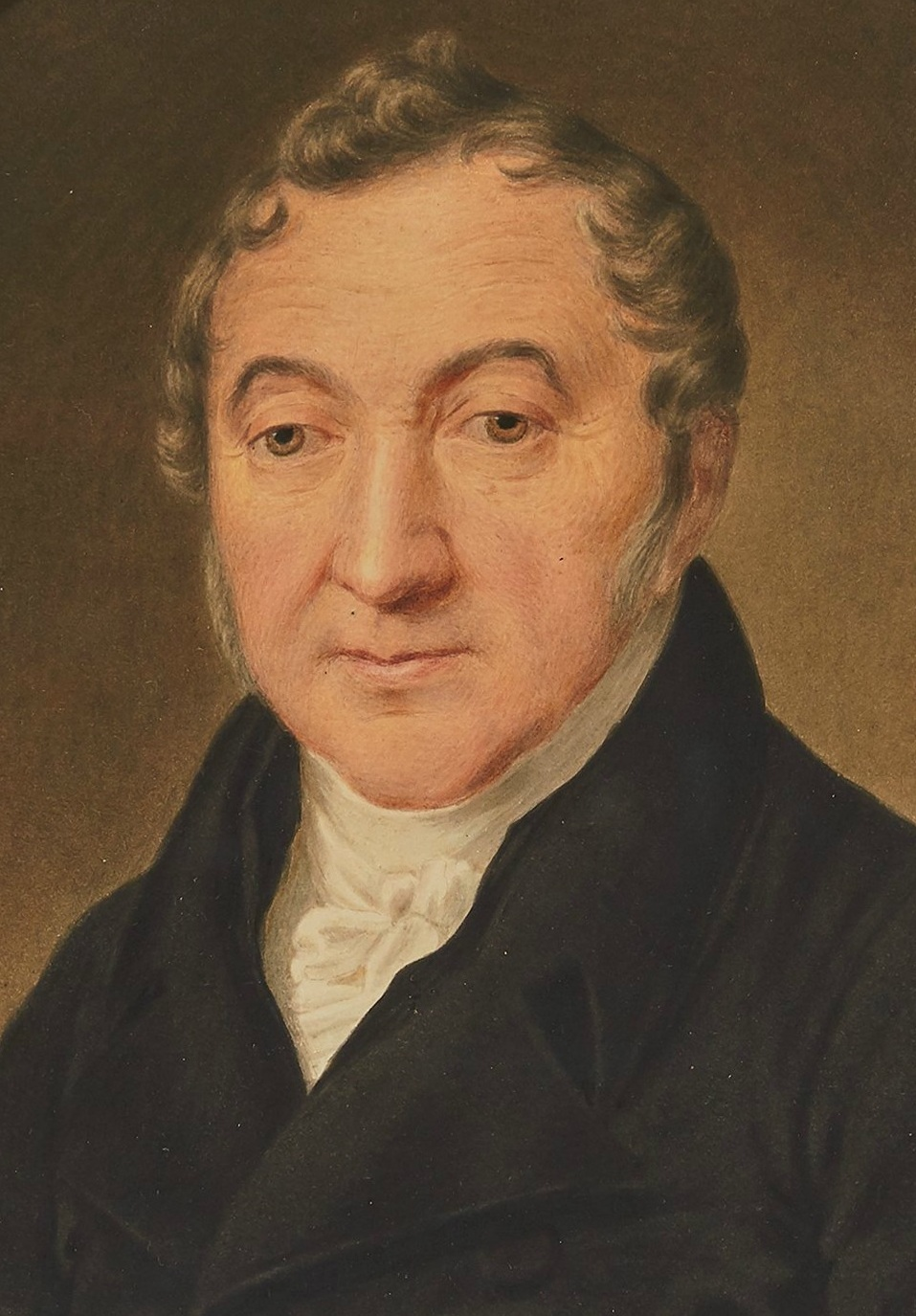
His son, the banker L.E. Seyler; in contrast to his father he became a highly respected banker

Abel Seyler was married in his first marriage from 1754 to Sophie Elisabeth Andreae (1730–1764), the daughter of the wealthy Hanoverian court pharmacist Leopold Andreae (1686–1730) and Katharina Elisabeth Rosenhagen (died 1752). Her parents were already deceased and her only close relative was her older brother and only sibling, the court pharmacist J.G.R. Andreae, who became a noted Enlightenment natural scientist. The wedding took place in Hanover and Abel and Sophie Elisabeth had two sons and a daughter: Abel Seyler (the Younger), who became court pharmacist in Celle and who was a member of the Illuminati; L.E. Seyler, a prominent Hamburg banker and politician; and Sophie Seyler, who married the Sturm und Drang poet Johann Anton Leisewitz, the author of Julius of Taranto.

After the death of his first wife in 1764, their children were raised in Hanover by their maternal uncle. By several accounts J.G.R. Andreae was a highly erudite, generous and kind man who became a loving father figure to his sister's children; he had no children of his own. The children since had limited or no contact with their father, and all lived more conventional lives than him. They inherited the Andreae pharmacy from their uncle on his death in 1793.

In 1772 Abel Seyler married the actress Friederike Sophie Seyler (formerly married Hensel). They had no children.

The principal founder of biochemistry and molecular biology, Felix Hoppe-Seyler, was an adopted son of his grandson. Seyler was a godfather of Jacob Herzfeld (born 1763), known as the first Jewish stage actor in Germany, when the latter converted to Christianity in 1796.

== Literature ==
- Paul Schlenther: "Abel Seyler." In: Allgemeine Deutsche Biographie (ADB). Vol. 34, Duncker & Humblot, Leipzig 1892, pp. 778–782.
- Andrea Heinz: "Seyler, Abel." In: Neue Deutsche Biographie (NDB). Vol. 24, Duncker & Humblot, Berlin 2010, ISBN 978-3-428-11205-0, p. 300.
- William Grange, "Seyler, Abel," Historical Dictionary of German Theater, Scarecrow Press, 2006, ISBN 0810853159
- Wilhelm Kosch, "Seyler, Abel", in Dictionary of German Biography, eds. Walther Killy and Rudolf Vierhaus, Vol. 9, Walter de Gruyter, 2005, ISBN 3110966298, p. 308
- "Abel Seyler," in Stanley Sadie (ed.), The New Grove Dictionary of Music and Musicians, vol. 17, p. 209, 1980
- Dirk Böttcher, Hannoversches Biographisches Lexikon: Von den Anfängen bis in die Gegenwart
- Thomas Bauman, "New directions: the Seyler Company" (pp. 91–131), in North German Opera in the Age of Goethe, Cambridge University Press, 1985
- Thomas Bauman, Music and Drama in Germany: A Traveling Company and Its Repertory, 1767–1781, PhD dissertation on the Seyler Theatre Company, University of California, Berkeley, 1977
- Magazin zur Geschichte des deutschen Theaters, 1773, VI, p. 264–276
- Rudolf Schlösser: Vom Hamburger Nationaltheater zur Gothaer Hofbühne. Nendeln/Liechtenstein: Kraus, 1978. Originally published in Hamburg, 1895.
- Adrian Kuhl: "Abel Seyler." In Silke Leopold (ed.), Lexikon Oper, J.B. Metzler, 2017, ISBN 978-3-476-02394-0
- Frost, Reinhard (1996). "Seyler, Abel". Frankfurter Personenlexikon. Vol. 2.
- "Abel Seyler". Brockhaus Enzyklopädie. 2022.
- Mohr, Albert Richard (1967). "Abel Seyler und seine Verdienste um das Frankfurter Theaterleben". Frankfurter Theater von der Wandertruppe zum Komödienhaus: ein Beitrag zur Theatergeschichte des 18. Jahrhunderts. Frankfurt am Main: Kramer. pp. 66–81.
- "Seyler." In: Allgemeines Theater-Lexikon oder Encyklopädie alles Wissenswerthen für Bühnenkünstler, Dilettanten und Theaterfreunde, Vol. 6, pp. 338–339
- Gustav Friedrich Wilhelm Großmann: Briefe an Hrn K ..... in L ..... die Seilerische Bühne in Dresden betreffend, Gerlach, 1775
- Friedrichs Theaterlexikon
- Deutsches Theater-Lexikon
- Pies, Eike: Prinzipale: Zur Genealogie des deutschsprachigen Berufstheaters vom 17. bis 19. Jahrhundert. Ratingen/Kastellaun/Düsseldorf 1973.
- Lexikon der deutschen Schauspieler, Vol. 8, No. 2
- C. Bernd Sucher: Theaterlexikon
- Trilse: Theaterlexikon
