= Seyler & Tillemann =

18th-century Hamburg merchant bank

- A silhouette of Abel Seyler
- Industry: Merchant bank
- Founder: Abel Seyler and Johann Martin Tillemann
- Headquarters: Hamburg

Seyler & Tillemann was a Hamburg merchant bank in the 1750s and 1760s, that was owned by Abel Seyler and Johann Martin Tillemann. It involved itself in the currency market and "malicious" speculation with financial instruments during the Seven Years' War. It had ties to the brothers De Neufville in Amsterdam. Seyler & Tillemann went bankrupt as a result of the Amsterdam banking crisis of 1763 with 3–4 million Mark Banco in debts, an enormous sum. Its downfall also contributed to the downfall of other banking houses e.g. in Scandinavia.

In 1761 Seyler & Tillemann, acting as agents of their close business associate Heinrich Carl von Schimmelmann, leased the mint factory in Rethwisch from the impoverished Frederick Charles, Duke of Schleswig-Holstein-Sonderburg-Plön, a member of a cadet branch of the Danish royal family, to produce debased coins in the final years of the Seven Years' War. Seyler and Tillemann also owned a large silver refinery in Hamburg.

The downfall of Seyler & Tillemann led to several years of litigation that reached the Imperial Cameral Tribunal in 1765. Much criticism was directed at Seyler and Tillemann's business ethics and extravagant lifestyle, and the company has been considered as one of the most speculative and immoral banks of the era. However, despite suffering "a sensational bankruptcy for an enormous sum [...] neither of them had lost his good humour or his taste for light living." Mary Lindemann notes that the court documents relating to the subsequent litigation offer "an excellent perspective on 'deceitful schemes' and especially on the bill-jobbing" of the related companies Seyler & Tillemann and Müller & Seyler. Abel Seyler later became famous as a theatre director.

== See also ==
- List of banks in Germany
