= Heinrich Beck =

Heinrich Beck may refer to:

- Heinrich Beck (actor) (1760–1803), German actor
- Heinrich Beck (brewer) (1832–1882), German brewer, founder of Beck's Brewery
- Heinrich Beck (philologist) (1929–2019), German professor
- Heinrich Beck (publisher) (1853–1914), German publisher, see Egon Friedell
