= Thomas Bauman =

American musicologist

Thomas Bauman (born March 10, 1948) is an American musicologist and Professor of Musicology at Bienen School of Music at Northwestern University. He is an expert on German opera, film music, Mozart, and African American theatrical history.

He earned his PhD at the University of California, Berkeley in 1977 with a dissertation on the Seyler Theatre Company. He has received National Endowment for the Humanities Fellowships, a Pew Foundation Grant, and an Andrew Mellon Faculty Fellowship at Harvard University.

He was a contributor to The Oxford Illustrated History of Opera (Oxford University Press, 1993), and the New Grove Dictionary of Opera (Macmillan, 1992). He is particularly known for his monograph North German Opera in the Age of Goethe (Cambridge University Press, 1985). His monograph The Pekin: The Rise and Fall of Chicago’s First Black-Owner Theater (University of Illinois Press, 2014) was considered "an important contribution to the field" by Choice.

== Selected works ==
- Music and Drama in Germany: A Traveling Company and Its Repertory, 1767–1781, PhD dissertation on the Seyler Theatre Company, University of California, Berkeley, 1977
- North German Opera in the Age of Goethe, Cambridge University Press, 1985)
- W. A. Mozart's Die Entführung aus dem Serail, Cambridge University Press, 1987
- The Pekin: The Rise and Fall of Chicago’s First Black-Owner Theater, University of Illinois Press, 2014).
