= Albert Richard Mohr =

Albert Richard Mohr (1911–1992) was a German music and theatre expert.

He was born in Frankfurt. He studied there at the Frankfurt University.

From 1937 to 1943 he was lecturer on Music and Theatre History at the Hochschule für Musik und Darstellende Kunst Frankfurt am Main.

From 1938, he was actively engaged in the Oper Frankfurt.

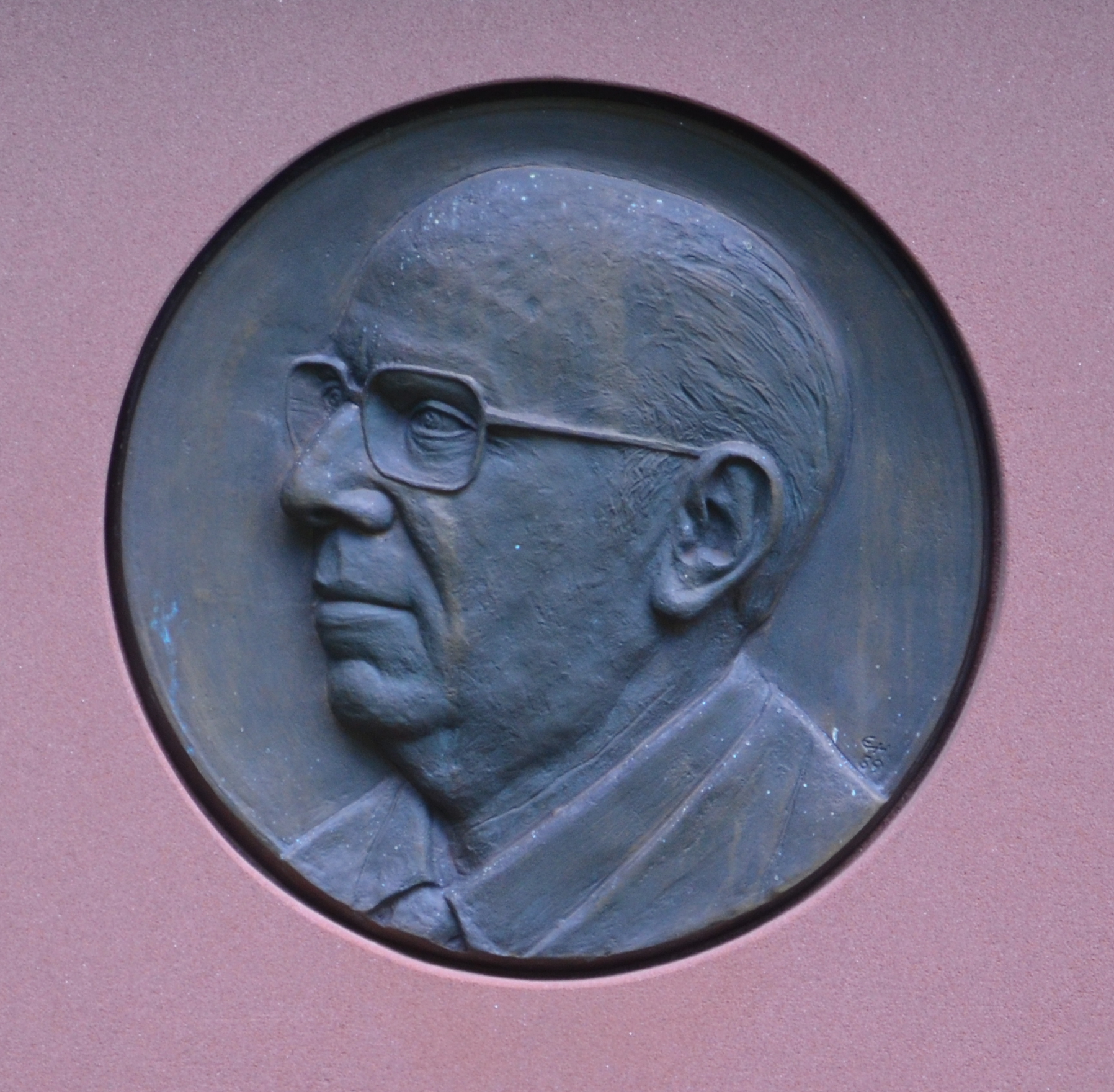

== Bibliography ==
- Albert Richard Mohr: Das Frankfurter Opernhaus 1880–1980. Kramer, Frankfurt am Main 1980, ISBN 3-7829-0232-7
