= Jacob Herzfeld =

German theatre director and actor

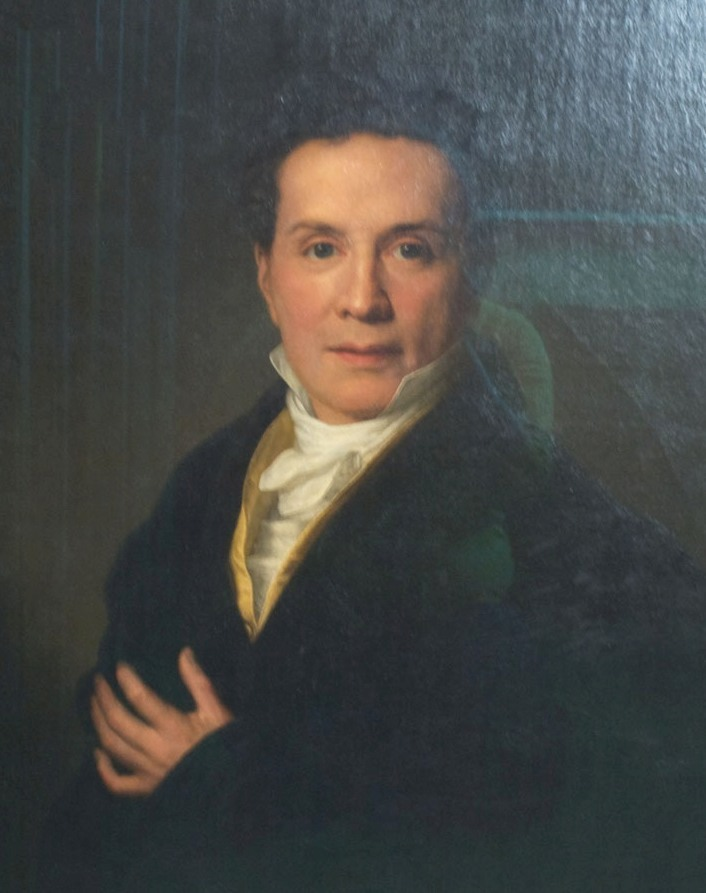
- Born: 1763; Dessau, Holy Roman Empire
- Died: October 24, 1826 (aged 62–63); Hamburg, Germany
- Occupation(s): Theatre director Actor

Jacob Herzfeld was a German theatre director and actor. He was admired by Goethe and Schiller and corresponded with both, and became known as the first serious Jewish actor on the German stage.
