= Heinrich Beck (actor) =

German actor and playwright

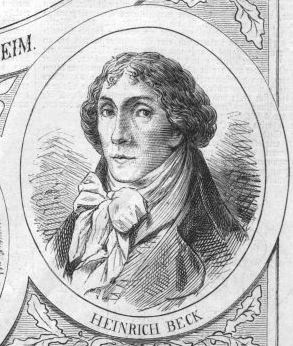
Heinrich Beck, actor and platwright

Heinrich Christian Beck (19 February 1760, in Gotha – 7 May 1803, in Mannheim) was a German actor and playwright.

Beck began his theatrical career with August Iffland and Johann David Beil at the Hoftheater (Court Theater) in Gotha and, like most of the ensemble, went to the Mannheim National Theater after the Hoftheater was disbanded in 1779. The National Theater was then blossoming artistically under the leadership of Wolfgang Heribert von Dalberg.

While there, Beck took part in the premieres of Schiller's first plays Die Räuber (as Kosinsky) and Fiesco (as Bourgognino).

In 1799 Prince-Elector Maximilian IV. Joseph von Bayern called him to Munich as a director. He returned to Mannheim in 1803 as theater director, dying there in 1803.

Beck was known for his acting skill and his good voice and acted with the same finesse in tragedies and comedies as in musicals.

Among his own plays, the comedies Die Schachmaschine (Berlin 1798), Die Quälgeister (Frankfurt 1802) and Das Kamäleon (Frankfurt 1803) found the most acclaIm. His dramatic work appeared under the title "Theater" in three volumes in Frankfurt, beginning in 1802.

Beck's first wife Karoline, née Ziegler (born 3 January 1766 in Mannheim), also a talented, promising actress, debuted in Mannheim in 1781 but died on 24 July 1784. Friedrich Schiller, who had envisioned her to portray his Luise in Kabale und Liebe, displayed a particular fondness for her.

== Literature ==
- Hans Knudsen: Heinrich Beck, ein Schauspieler aus der Blütezeit des Mannheimer Theaters im 18. Jahrhundert. Leipzig, Hamburg: Voss 1912
