= Mary Lindemann =

American historian

- Born: 1949 (age 76–77); United States
- Education: University of Cincinnati
- Scientific career
- Fields: History
- Workplaces: University of Miami

Mary Lindemann (born 1949) is an American historian and professor emerita of history at the University of Miami. She was president of the American Historical Association during the term 2020 and president of the German Studies Association during the term 2017–2018. She is a leading expert on the history of early modern Europe, the history of Germany and the history of medicine, especially early modern German, Dutch, and Flemish history. She is co-editor-in-chief of the journal Early Modern Women.

She received her Ph.D. in history from the University of Cincinnati in 1980, and became professor of history at the University of Miami in 2004. She also served as chair of the History Department. She was a Fellow-in-Residence at the Netherlands Institute for Advanced Study 2002–2003, was affiliated with the Wellcome Trust Centre for the History of Medicine 2007–2008, was a fellow-in-residence at the Flemish Academic Centre for Science and the Arts in Brussels in 2011 and a senior research fellow of the State of Lower Saxony at the Herzog August Library 2014–2016.

Her first book Patriots and Paupers: Hamburg, 1712–1830 was honored as an "Outstanding Academic Title" by Choice. She received the William H. Welch Medal in 1998. She received an NEH fellowship for 1997–1998 and a Guggenheim Fellowship for 1998–1999.

== Bibliography ==
Books

- Patriots and Paupers: Hamburg, 1712–1830, Oxford University Press, 1990
- Health and Healing in Eighteenth-Century Germany, Johns Hopkins University Press, 1996
- Medicine and Society in Early Modern Europe, Cambridge University Press, 1999
- Liaisons dangereuses: Sex, Law, and Diplomacy in the Age of Frederick the Great, Johns Hopkins University Press, 2006
- The Merchant Republics: Amsterdam, Antwerp, and Hamburg, 1648–1790, Cambridge University Press, 2015

Chapters and papers

- — (2009). "The Anxious Merchant, the Bold Speculator, and the Malicious Bankrupt: Doing Business in Eighteenth-Century Hamburg". In Jacob, Margaret C.; Secretan, Catherine (eds.). The Self-Perception of Early Modern Capitalists. Palgrave Macmillan. doi:10.1007/978-0-230-61380-5_8. ISBN 978-0-230-60447-6.
