= Leendert Pieter de Neufville =

Dutch banker and art collector (1729–1811)

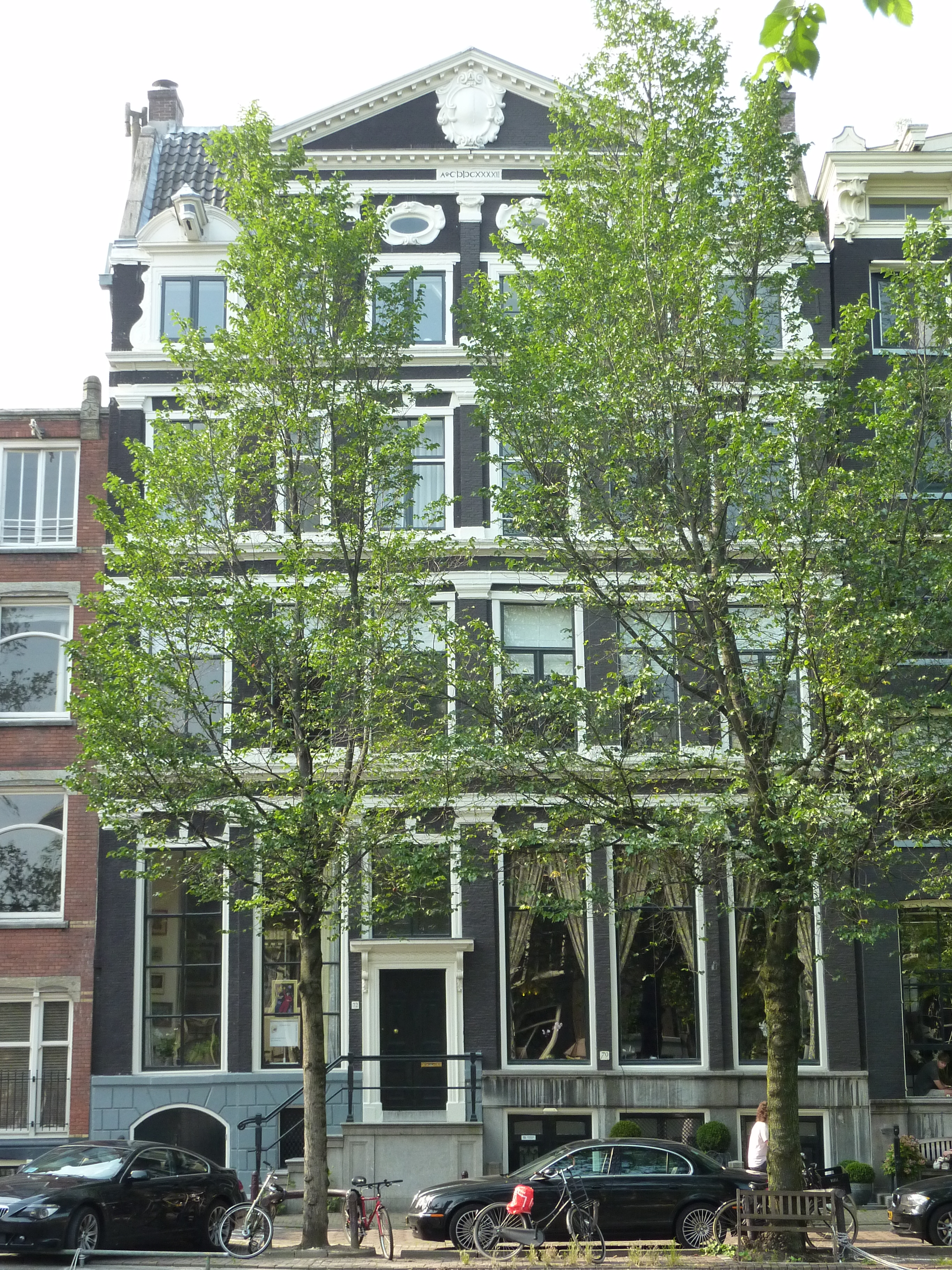
Herengracht 70-72 which De Neufville rented from Pieter Steyn and where he lived during his bankruptcy.

Leendert Pieter de Neufville (Amsterdam, March 8, 1729 – Rotterdam, July 28, 1811) was a Dutch merchant and banker trading in silk, linen, and grain. His business grew quickly during the Seven Years' War. De Neufville secretly supplied the Prussian army with gunpowder. It is likely that the army's outsourcing of handling bills of exchange in commercial payment boosted his business in a sophisticated form of letters of credit, acceptance loans. His business model had similarities with the modern shadow banking system.

Beginning in 1762 De Neufville became involved in melting down debased coins, no longer allowed in Prussia and Saxony, with the plan to sell back the melted silver. In Spring 1763 De Neufville was party to a major speculative grain deal with the Berlin merchant banker Johann Ernst Gotzkowsky. The financial crisis of July 1763 was triggered when De Neufville had to pay his obligations to Gotzkowsky. De Neufville suspended payment on 3 August 1763; his list of creditors included over 100 bill counterparties, the great majority of those residing in cities outside of the Dutch Republic.

== Early life ==
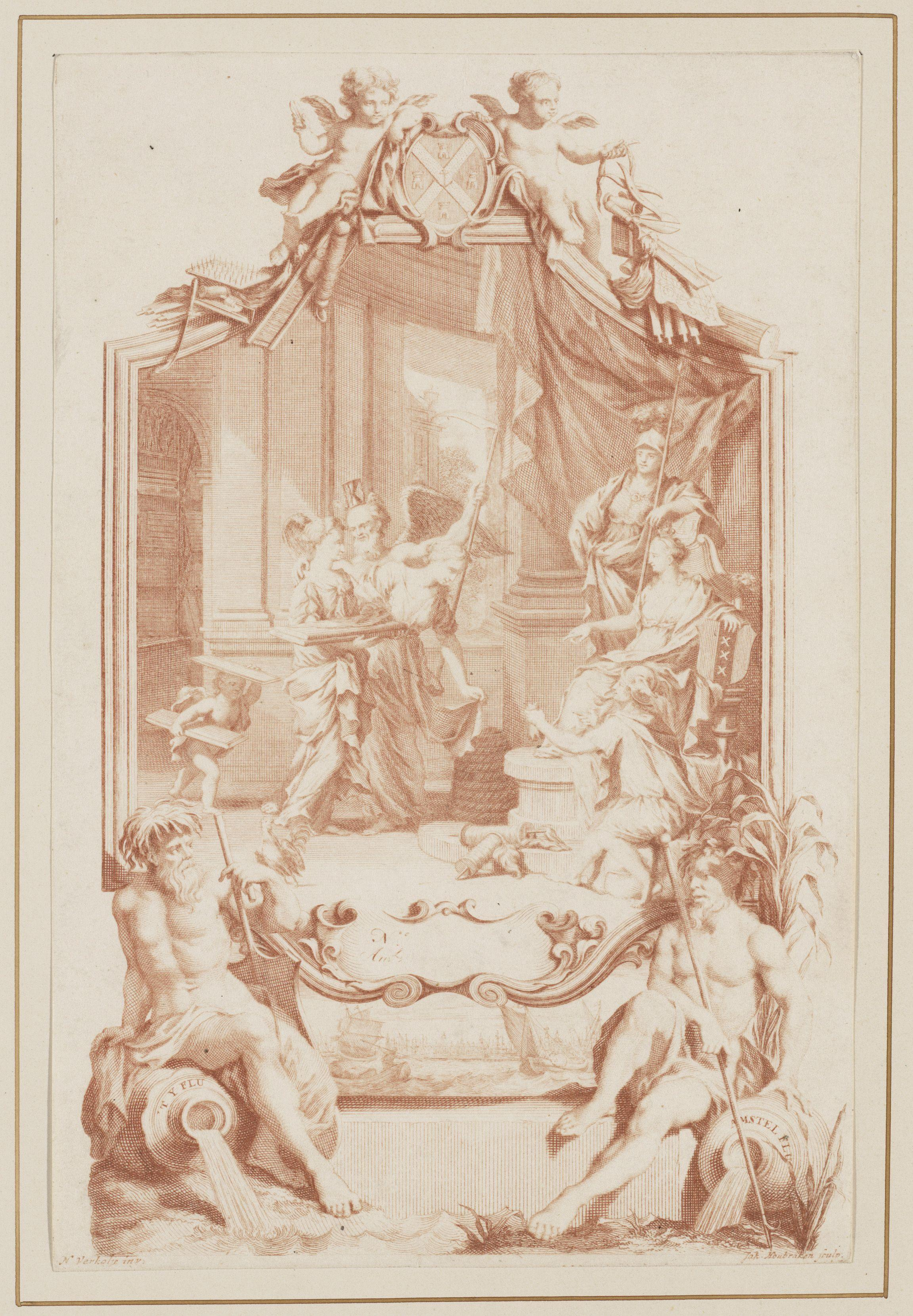
P.L. de Neufville's "business card", dealer in satin fabrics, with allegorical representation by Nicolaas Verkolje and Jacob Houbraken

Leendert Pieter de Neufville was the son of Pieter Leendert de Neufville (1707-1759) and lady Catharina de Wolff (1708-1760), both Mennonites. His father started out as a merchant in textiles and rye, with extensive trade on the east of Germany and the Mediterranean. On 1 February 1735 Pieter L. de Neufville went bankrupt. He sold his share in a dozen ships. His wife was his biggest creditor.

In 1750 Leendert Pieter and his brothers David and Balthasar took over the trading and banking house from their father. The Neufville Bros. traded in almost everything: silver (formally for 82,429 guilders), almonds, sugar, Meissen porcelain, and gum were the most important products. In 1757 he started to buy and trade in paintings and became, like his father, an art collector.

== Seven Years’ War ==
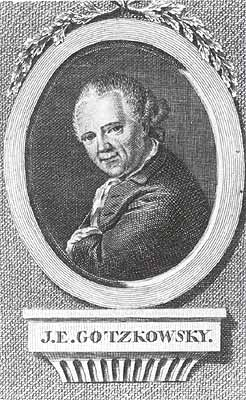

"During the war, they were catapulted into being one of the richest and most prestigious banking houses of Amsterdam by taking full advantage of the opportunities that the buoyant war economy provided." De Neufville was the first to provide forage (and clothing) for the army of the King's youngest brother, Prince August Ferdinand of Prussia, who took part in the campaign in Bohemia in 1757, but was fired by his brother after the Prussian defeat at the Battle of Kolin. Also Charles William Ferdinand, Duke of Brunswick-Wolfenbüttel, an army contractor, placed orders with De Neufville. Having a contact with a Hamburg merchant's house for handling the bills made De Neufville Bros. a trusted party in commercial payments between Amsterdam and Hamburg and its Hinterland. Prussia can be considered as an "emerging market" and Hamburg played an intermediate role.

The Seven Years’ War brought an economic boom not only to the neutral states, such as Holland and Hamburg, but also to antagonist states such as Prussia. This boom was accompanied by a strong expansion of credit through bills of exchange. At the same time inflation became a widespread phenomenon in northern Europe, as many German states and other countries like Sweden financed the war by debasing their currencies.

Beginning in 1758, De Neufville became a monthly buyer of gunpowder. From 1759 things seemed to be going very well for him. De Neufville was also engaged in shipping and insurance. His account turnover at the Bank of Amsterdam increased ten times between 1759 and 1762. A little light-hearted De Neufville assisted Gotzkowsky (like Schimmelmann, and Daniel Stenglin, etc.) in helping Saxony pay its war contribution to Frederick II. In January 1762 the Parliament of Great Britain threatened to stop its subsidy to Prussia; on 30 April a bill to this effect went through. Frederick had to adjust his war finance after losing Britain's support.

On 7 or 18 November 1761, Frederick forbade the use of foreign debased coins in Prussia and Saxony that were minted (by Schimmelmann) in Rethwisch. Already in January De Neufville started to import and melt debased coins from Mecklenburg, Plön and Zerbst, expecting to sell the refined silver at a high price to Prussian merchants. De Neufville ordered 300 wagons of coins.

On 6 February 1762, De Neufville wrote a note to Frederick, who was then stationed in Breslau, stating that the French had approached him to make peace proposals to Frederick. De Neufville hoped for an appointment as a negotiator. In May 1762 De Neufville bought an estate outside Heemstede; he experimented with silver refining, but was not very successful, according to Johann Heinrich Müntz.

== After the Peace of Hubertusburg ==
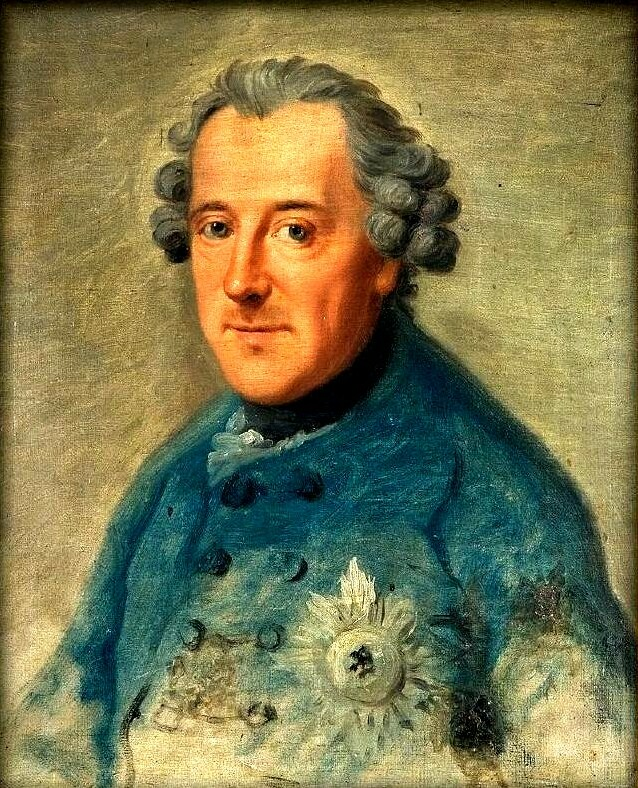
Frederick II in 1763, portrait by Johann Georg Ziesenis

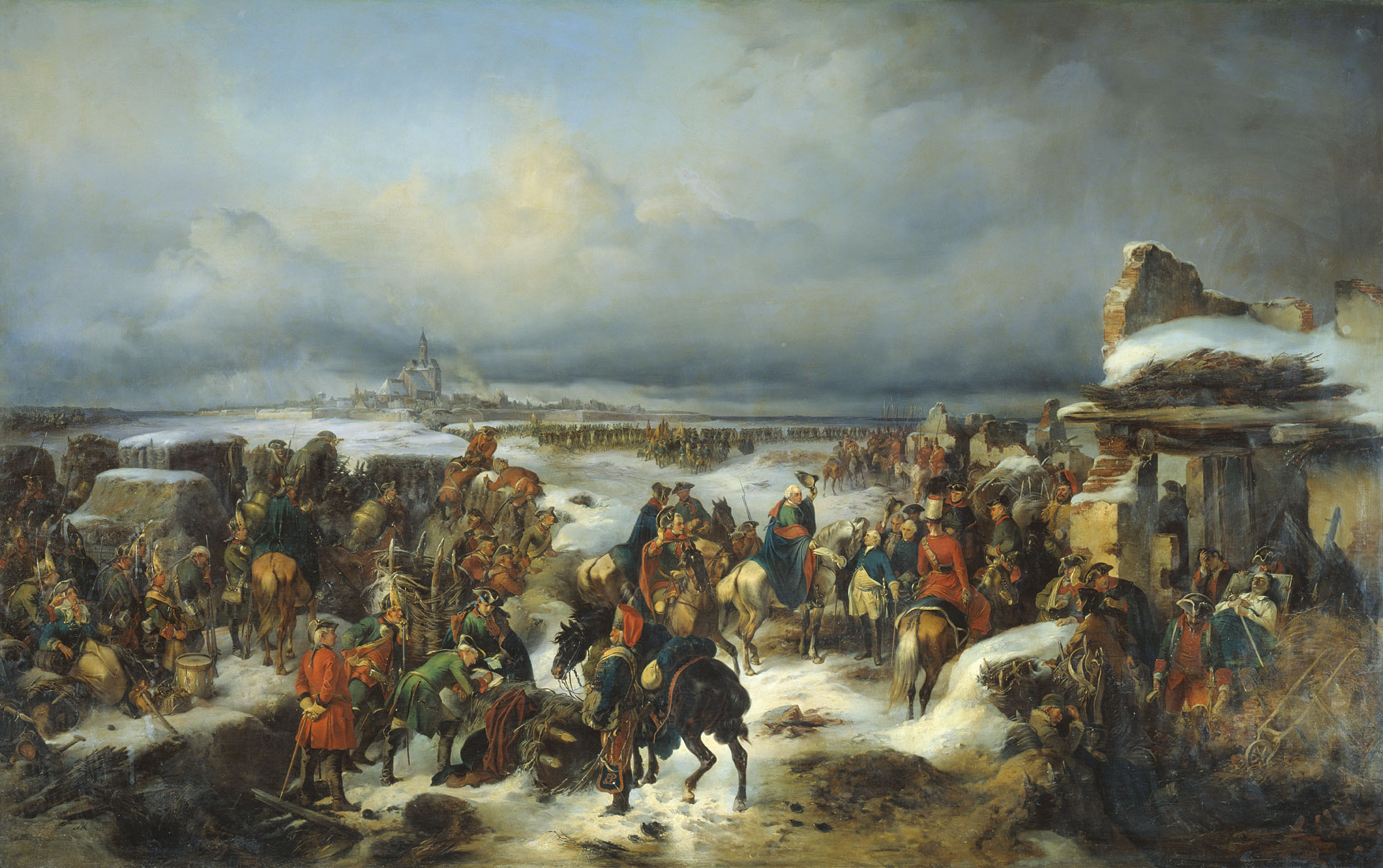
The fall of fortress Kolberg in 1761 to Russian troops by Alexander Kotzebue

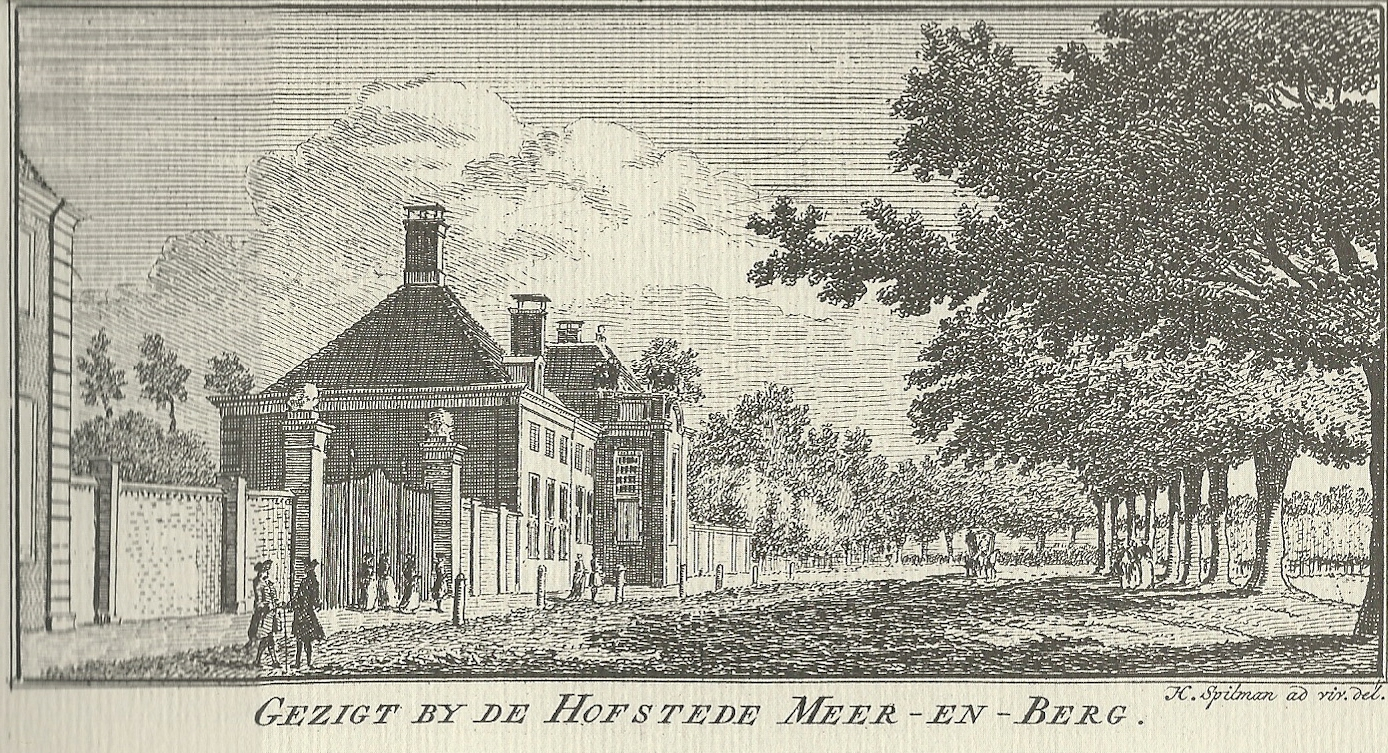
View on the surroundings of Heemstede (1761) by Hendrik Spilman

In April 1763 De Neufville went to Berlin. There he met with his business partner Gotzkowsky. Together they paid a visit to Frederick the Great. De Neufville offered his help in reviving the Prussian Asiatic Company. According to Gotzkowsky, it was Frederick the Great who asked De Neufville to develop plans for a recovery of the Asiatic company. De Neufville offered to invest a million guilders. According to Jan Jacob Mauricius, the Dutch resident in Hamburg, the merchant/bankers Schimmelmann and Stenglin were interested in restarting the company with help from De Neufville.

On 19/20 April Gotzkowsky bought a huge amount of grains (oats) through the intermediation of the Russian envoy Vladimir Sergeevich Dolgorukov (1717 - 1803). It was stored in Kolberg and along Pommeranian coast, sitting unused after the Russian army had left Poland. Both Russia and Prussia were hoping for a swift sale, that would allow for a discharge of the troops who had to guard these supplies. Because of a grain shortage and famine in Prussia, the transaction could have been profitable for Gotzkowsky and De Neufville, the latter one secretly collaborating with two partners Stein and Leveaux, all collectors of art. Neufville paid 100,000 guilders down payment (in exchange bills) on behalf of the buying syndicate. The remaining one million guilders were to be paid by Gotzkowsky in four terms, within a year. Two Russian traders, Svešnikov and Rogovikov, would take over a 1/5 of the total grain sold. The remaining 4/5 was allocated to Gotzkowsky, De Neufville, Leveaux und Stein. The contract was signed by just two men: Gotzkowsky and Svešnikov.

On 12 April 1763, Frederick decided to dump his unused wartime grain supplies in Lower Silesia, leading in the next months to a 75% drop in the local price of wheat, with other commodities prices soon following. On June 27, 1763, (N.S.) the Gotzkowsky transaction became a state affair of the Russian Empire. Legal problems meant that the grain would not now be exported. When it arrived after two months half of the grain was of bad quality. Gotzkowsky wanted to change the contract and offered to pay only 2/3 of 1.170.448 guilders owed. (He could not mention Svešnikov, playing a double role in the deal?) He would have been satisfied if he did not suffer any loss. On 18 July the Russian senate refused this offer and insisted on being paid promptly; she demanded payment in Dutch guilders, and not in debased Saxon coins.

== Liquidity ==
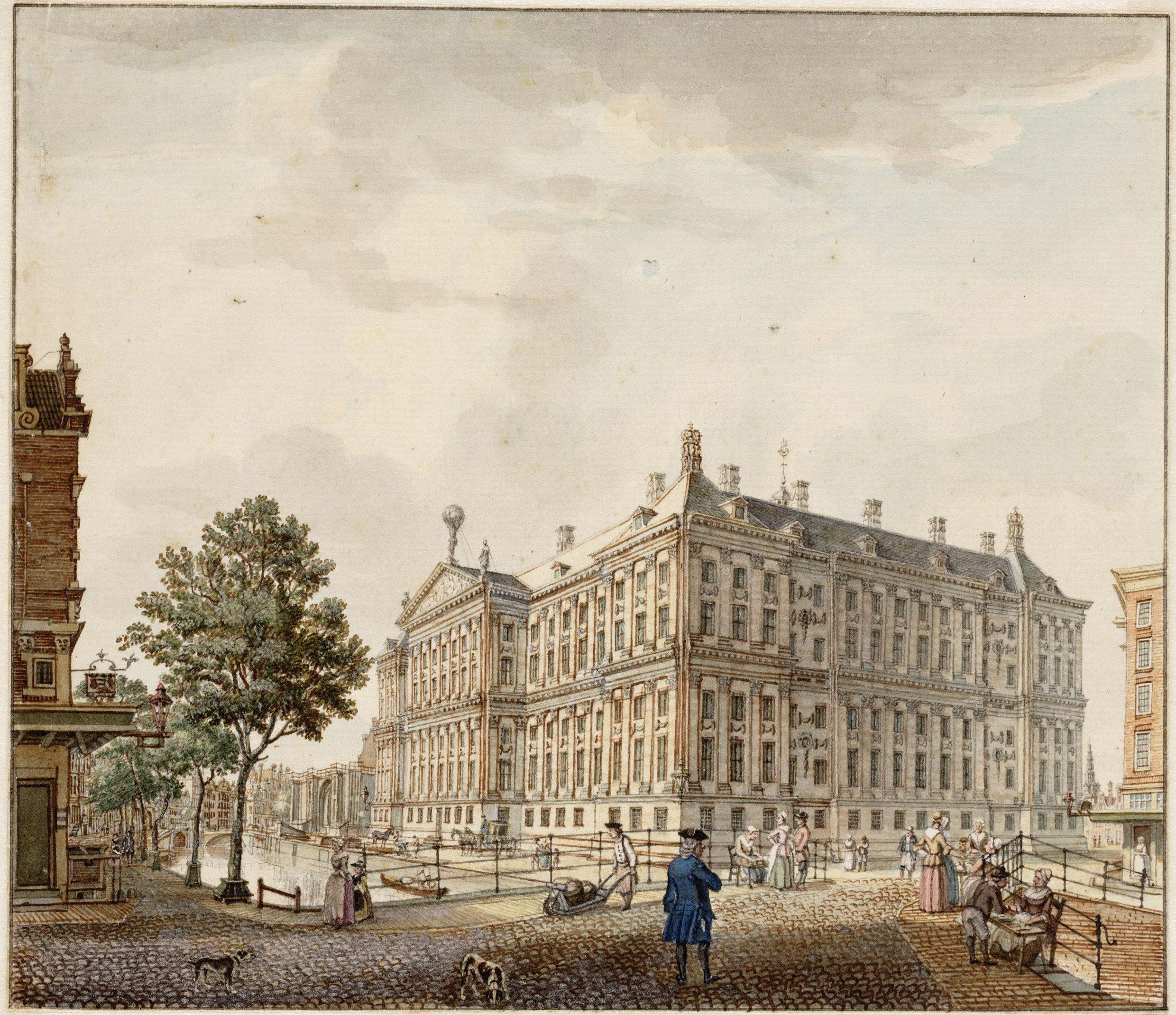
The southside of the Amsterdam townhall, where the Wisselbank was located. Print by Jan de Beijer (1758)

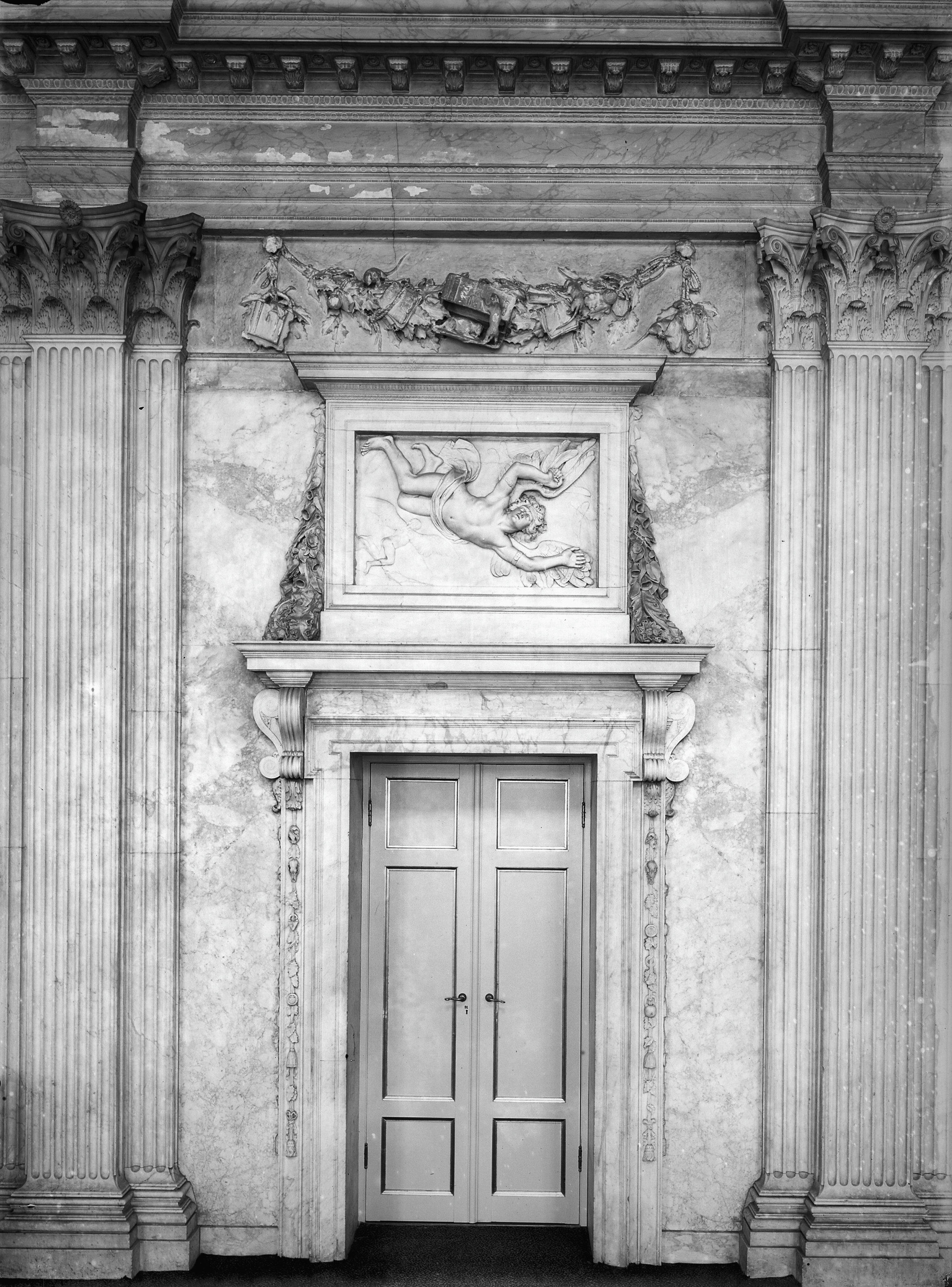
The entrance of the "Desolate Boedelkamer" in the Amsterdam town hall, with the fall of Icarus in the supraporte

De Neufville settled 240,000 guilders in bills of exchange every week (i.e. 40,000 daily) at the Bank of Amsterdam or "Wisselbank", so that his outstanding bill of exchange portfolio would have been 1.2 million; half for clients of bills that De Neufville had drawn and half for the settlement of bills drawn on De Neufville. Starting in April De Neufville borrowed 335,793 guilders over the next four months. In Amsterdam De Neufville borrowed with a term of only eight days - an unusually short period of maturity. The rate on interest rose from 4 to 12%.

In May 1763 one Amsterdam observer remarked: "The crude bars of silver that are being smelted here from the money arriving in great quantities from the north of Germany, cannot be sold and are everywhere being borrowed against; these are also being discounted by 7 percent. … Everything is bad for business." From 1 June the market for discounted bills collapsed when Frederick demonetized his debased wartime coinage before new money was issued. When the Saxon debased coins were removed from circulation and new coins had not yet come available, a severe shortage of cash money resulted, especially in Silesia. Prussian merchants that were holding the demonetized coins saw the value of their collateral cut by 22%, or 41%? Consequently, they responded by trying to fund short-term debts with new bills drawn on markets such as Amsterdam.

June 1763 saw the first step (from 30- to 19 3/4 Talerfuß) of a return to the old currency in Prussia, based on 14-Taler or "Graumannscher Münzfuß". After the latter were demonetized a tremendous shortage of "good" money arose. The war coins could only be exchanged at their metallic value. In Saxony, everybody was checking the value of his silver coins and people were afraid to exchange them for gold (Friedrich d'Or). Their loss in war coins' value had to be borne by their owners.

On 24 June De Neufville was given permission to start a glass works in Haarlem. On June 28, 1763, Carl Leveaux, a Berlin banker, drew seven bills on De Neufville for an amount of 12,900 guilders and 5,160 Thaler, to be paid on cash. De Neufville wrote him that the silver transport would be delayed for some time. Neufville supplied Leveaux for 149,300 guilders in silver. In this transaction De Neufville participated for 1/3 of the profit. (Bachmann & Co in Magdeburg were also involved in the silver business.) At the end of June 1763, De Neufville's account balance at the Bank of Amsterdam had fallen back to about the same level as it had in 1751. A snapshot of De Neufville's balance sheet at the end of June shows all the symptoms of a leveraged trader in distress.

== Perfect storm ==
When Leveaux and Von Stein dropped out of the grain deal it must have come as a shock to De Neufville and Gotzkowsky. The restructuring of the Gotzkowsky deal put tremendous pressure on De Neufville, who then became responsible for 3/5 of the deal. Gotzkowsky had lent at least two million Prussian thaler to Saxony to pay its war contribution to Frederick. Gotzkowsky had not yet sold all the municipal bonds he had received in return. Gotzkowsky had also an impressive number of paintings in stock which he accumulated during the war and had not been sold to Frederick II. He managed a silkworks, a jewelry business in Leipzig with J.R. Streckfuss, a porcelain factory (now KPM) that was not running at his satisfactory, all at the same time. By the end of July 1763, both Gotzkowsky and De Neufville had difficulty finding the needed money to settle their obligations and feared they would go bankrupt. Early 1763 the London stock market dropped. De Neufville lost money there too.

The Bank of Amsterdam shut twice a year (January and July) for two weeks to balance its books (In 1763 from Friday 15 July - till Friday 29 July). It is likely that nobody was willing to lend De Neufville such a large amount of money over the shutdown interval and on Monday. De Neufville was forced to wait until the Wisselbank reopened on Tuesday 2 August.

Gotzkowsky was clearly relying on De Neufville to pay his share of the purchase of the Russian magazine. De Neufville was, in turn, relying on people like Aron Joseph. When Joseph went bankrupt, the chain unravelled. This caused a general loss of confidence in bills from Hamburg, Berlin, etc. by Amsterdam merchants. Loss of funding from Amsterdam then forced many merchants in Germany into bankruptcy.

The strain on liquidity was most keenly felt by speculators like De Neufville and Arend Joseph & Co; the latter failed on 28 July 1763, and fled, after three respite days, to Culemborg, a hiding place for bankrupts. It was likely that a combination of multiple shocks that sunk Neufville: 1) sudden demand for more liquidity from the Gotzkowsky deal, and 2) loss of access to liquidity after the failure of A. Joseph. De Neufville closed his business on Friday 29 July. A proposal for a bailout was circulated, but rejected after some debate.

Turbulent sea by Ludolf Bakhuizen, owned by De Neufville sr, for sale on 19 June 1765.

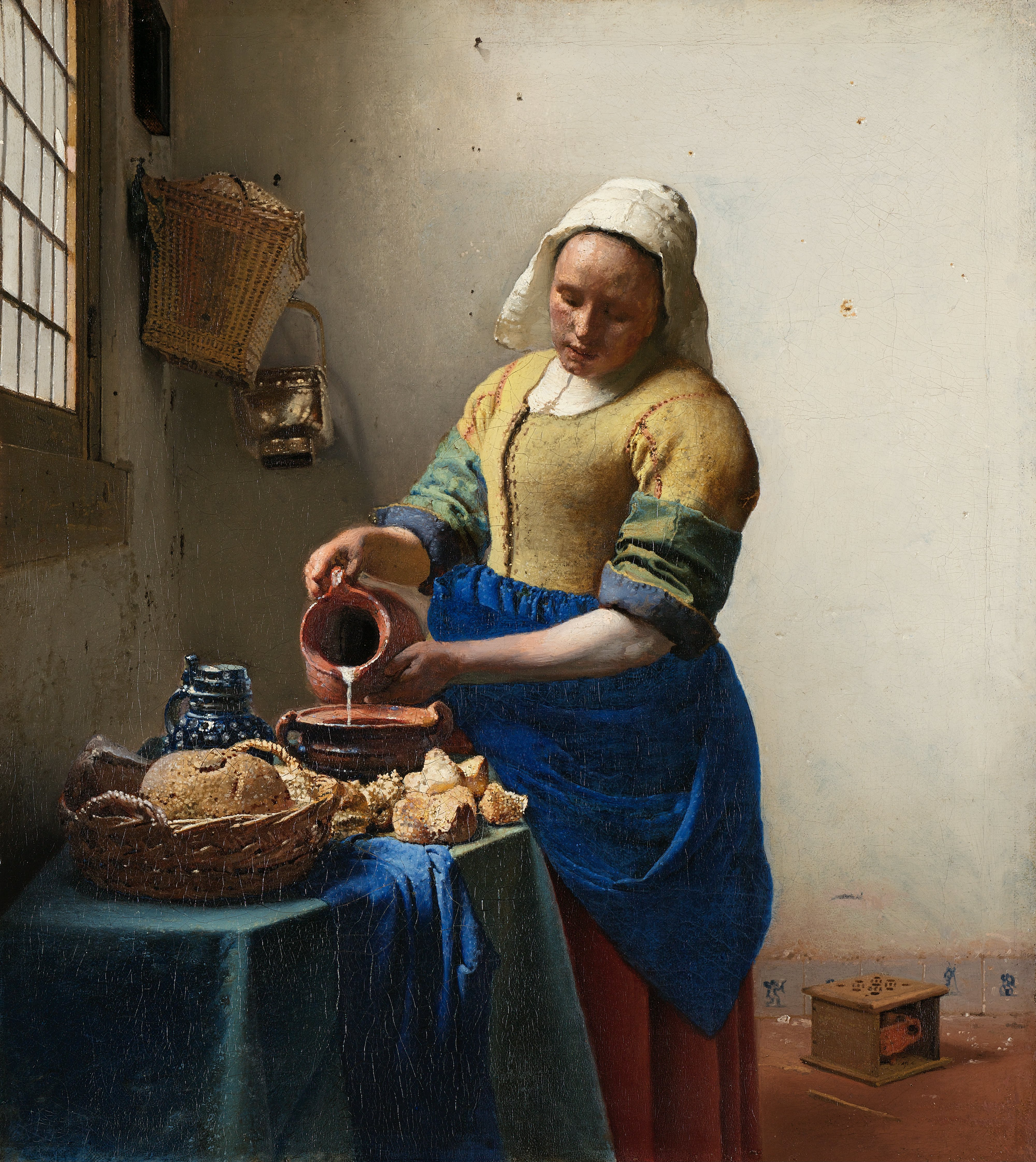
The Milkmaid by Johannes Vermeer was until the auction in June 1765 in the possession of De Neufville.

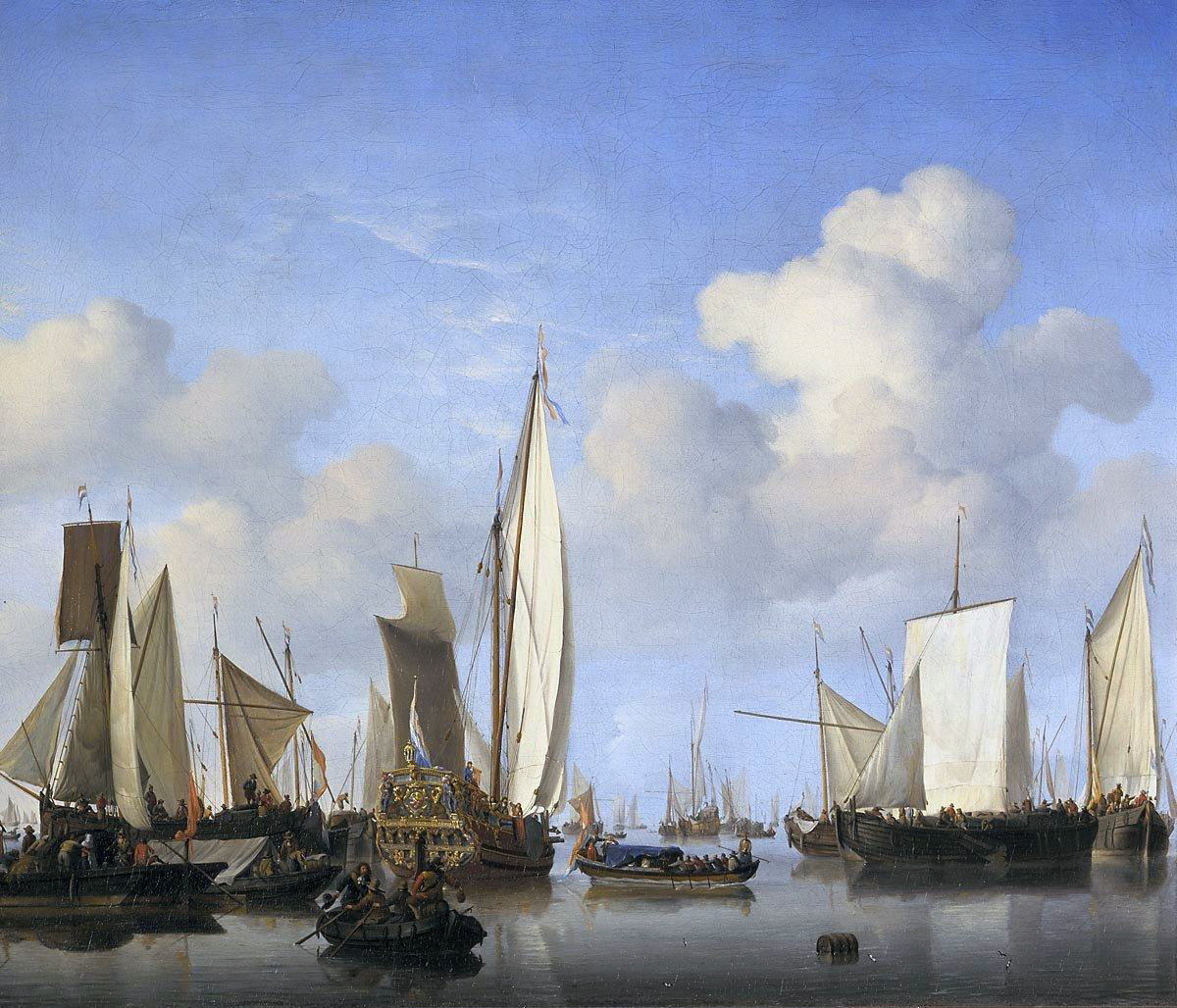
Ships on the roadstead by Willem van de Velde the Younger, Mauritshuis

On Monday 1 August the Wisselbank refused to transfer any money. On 2 August the bankers in Amsterdam refused to lend De Neufville the money (700,000 guilders) to pay his obligations to Gotzkowsky. (The banking houses of Hope & Co, Clifford, Warin and Muilman tried to form a syndicate, but Andries Pels & Zoonen refused to participate.) When De Neufville failed to come to an agreement with these bankers his suspension of payment became de facto a bankruptcy. The news that De Neufville stopped payments reached Hamburg already on 4 August at 11.00 a.m. (It is a mystery how fast the news could spread so quickly.) In a panic a group of prominent Hamburg merchants sent a petition to the leading Amsterdam bankers, demanding a bankruptcy preference, and threatening a shutdown of their market for Amsterdam bills if this was not granted. The Hamburg merchants’ threat only served to initiate a three-month-long shutdown of the Amsterdam market for Hamburg bills. (It seems like boycotting De Neufville?) Six leading Amsterdam bankers suggested on 4 August to deposit their silver and gold bars at the Wisselbank instead of coins. The "Wisselbank" introduced a new lending window that accepted bullion between 4 and 15 August. The amount of bullion went up in the next few weeks.

The shocking failure of De Neufville caused the market to contract its lending to banks, banks to stop accepting bills and creditors to stop lending on the security of bills. Their reaction caused financial contagion, a "run behaviour, whereby fears of widespread financial collapse lead to the withdrawal of funding from banks and other financial institutions." The immediate victims were a group of independent, private "cashiers". (The deposits in the Wisselbank were virtually unenforceable, but everyone was free to demand the money that he had entrusted to his cashier.) The deferrals resulted in an international banking crisis in Amsterdam (38 bankruptcies), Hamburg (90-97), Stockholm and Danzig. Leveaux became insolvent on 9 August 1763. The bankers became unwilling to extend credit to one another, so that the failure of Neufville led to a general loss of market funding.

On 5 August, the banks were closed and all bills drawn on Amsterdam were returned without acceptance or "protested". A run on the cashiers (bank tellers) followed on Saturday, 6 August. The Bank of Amsterdam and the Stadsbank van Lening were open until two o'clock that night to accept gold and silver, which had never happened before. The Bank of Amsterdam's improvised solution to the crisis was for the Bank to expand its receipt window (much like a modern repo facility) to now include unminted silver bullion, a form of collateral that was in abundant supply after the Prussian demonetization. On Monday 8 August, De Neufville announced that he wanted to sell six horses and at least seven coaches on 24 August. On Monday, August 15, one of De Neufville's ships was auctioned. In the second half of August the number of refusals to pay out bills of exchange on Amsterdam rose significantly but also the number of bankruptcies in Hamburg. On Friday 19 August a second wave of bankruptcies in Amsterdam followed. On Sunday, August 21, Frederick the Great wrote to both the Amsterdam city council and the States General of the Netherlands with the request to prop up the De Neufville Bros. He proposed to exclude the chamber of bankruptcies and convene a special committee. On 23 August De Neufville authorized Jean Conrad Sollicoffre, a Swiss banker in The Hague, to "organize" his bookkeeping. He said he would have a trade capital of 1.3 million guilders in cash if everyone would only meet their obligations to him.

On 25 August De Neufville protested against a recovery plan, from which he was excluded. On 29 August De Neufville's request for suspension of payment was rejected. On 30 August his creditors went to court; De Neufville was not granted an extension till 25 October 1763? On 3 September a loan was issued in Amsterdam to keep three threatened houses afloat. His creditors forced him to sell 500 bars of silver against which he had borrowed money. (Joseph and De Neufville had both borrowed privately from other people, using the bars as collateral.) On 11 September Neufville returned two barrels with debased coins worth 50,000 guilders to Carl Leveaux. On 23 September, the States-General decided not to set up a separate committee on De Neufville.

== Bankruptcy ==
On 7 October 1763 De Neufville, registering himself as being bankrupt, was placed under guardianship; the expiration date of most bills had already passed. The Amsterdam Chamber of Insolvent Estates (Desolate Boedelkamer) became responsible for his property. On 10 October, the treasurer of the Chamber began an inventory of De Neufville's possessions. On 24 October, and not on 24 August as Van Nierop and De Jong-Keesing stated, the estate of De Neufville was valued for 6,390 or with an increase of 10% for 7,022 guilders; hundreds of napkins, pillowcases, and handkerchieves, but none of the paintings was mentioned. The next day his case was heard by the Chamber. By November 1763 the crisis was over; the exchange rates dropped to a normal level. De Neufville promised to pay back his creditors 70, 60 and then 50%. Because he was not successful in paying his creditors any more than 10%, however, they took him to court in 1770.

== Other activities ==
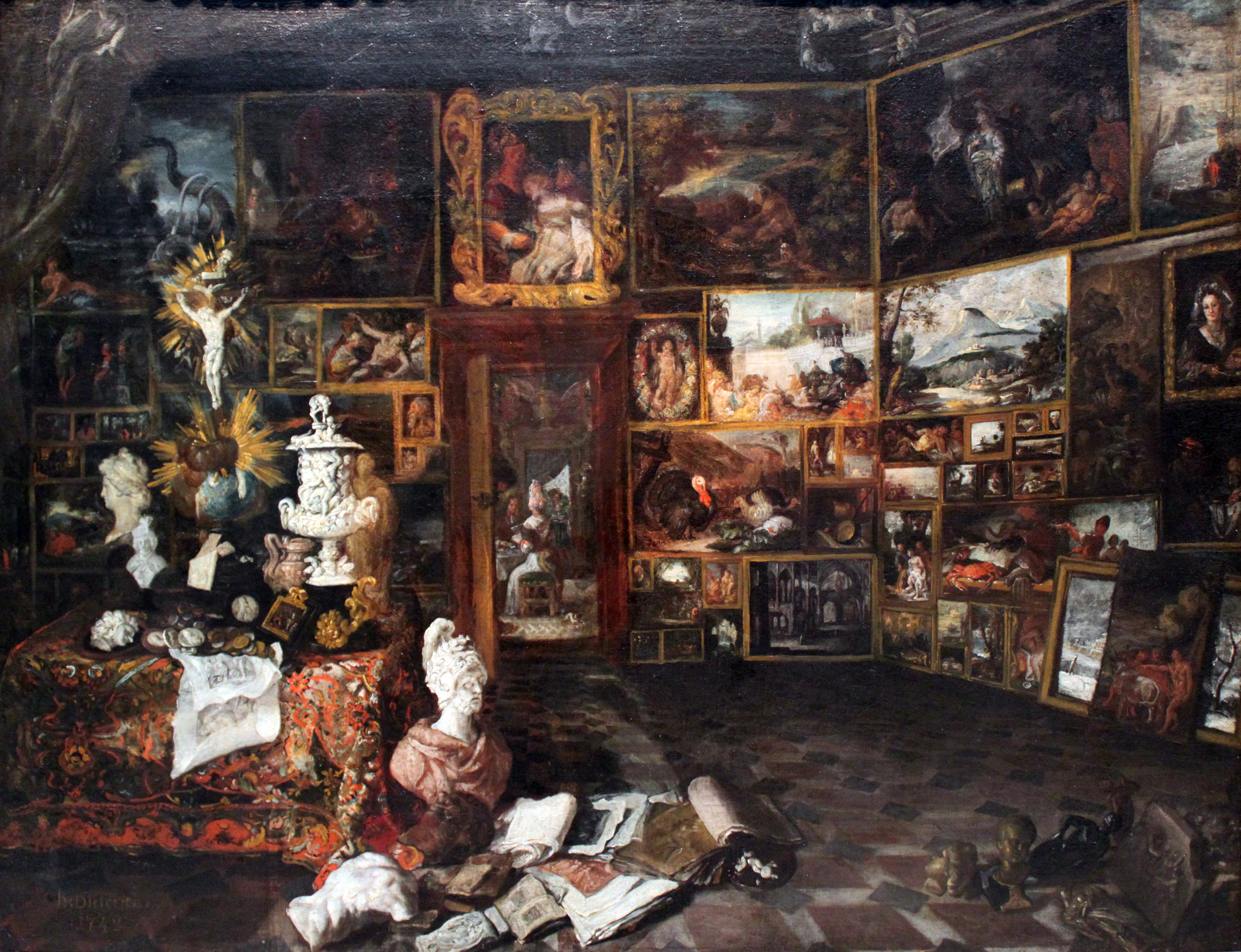
Picture cabinet by Christian Wilhelm Ernst Dietrich

In 1756 the 26-year-old De Neufville married the 18-year-old Margaretha Smid (1737-1774), a Lutheran. Leendert was Reformed, and living at Keizersgracht 15. In August 1757 he bought his first paintings. Between 1759 and 1763 he attended seventeen auctions. On 18 May 1763, he bought a number of works from the collection of Cardinal Silvio Valenti Gonzaga. Landgravine Caroline Louise of Hesse-Darmstadt and her husband Margrave Charles Frederick, Grand Duke of Baden visited De Neufville on July 1. On 4 July 1763 he bought 15 paintings in The Hague, including a Gerard Dou, Frans Hals, Paulus Potter, Philips Wouwerman and Jan van Huysum, from the collection of Willem Lornier, for the price of 9,115 guilders. The purchase has never been paid. On 29 October, the directors of the bankrupt chamber announced that they wanted to auction the painting collection of De Neufville on 14 December 1763. This auction never took place because De Neufville again obtained permission to put his affairs in order. On 19 June 1765 his collection of paintings, partly set up by his father, was auctioned.

It seems De Neufville finally went bankrupt in 1775. Until 1777 De Neufville lived in Amsterdam; he had sold his estate near Heemstede. In 1778 De Neufville moved to Rotterdam, where he remarried in 1805. Between 1787 and 1800 De Neufville was fairly active in Delft and the surrounding area in buying real estate; no more bills of exchange. The number of deeds to his name is amazing. Another auction of paintings was held in 1804; De Neufville had a special interest for the German painter Christian Wilhelm Ernst Dietrich. In the year of his death the debtors received another 1%.

== Sources ==
- Bikker, J. (2012) The hidden collection of the spectacularly bankrupt banker Leendert Pieter de Neufville
- Büsch, Johann Georg (1797) Versuch einer Geschichte der Hamburgischen Handlung nebst 2 kleineren Schriften verwandten Inhalts. Benjamin Gottlob Hoffman. Hamburg.
- Cedillo, I. (2013) The Historical Role of the European Shadow Banking System in the Development and Evolution of Our Monetary Institutions. CITYPERC Working Paper Series No. 2013/05. Available at SSRN: https://ssrn.com/abstract=2220167 or https://dx.doi.org/10.2139/ssrn.2220167
- Henderson, W.O. (1963) Studies in the Economic Policy of Frederick the Great.
- Jong-Keesing, E.E. de (1939) De economische crisis van 1763 te Amsterdam.
- Rachel, H. & P. Wallich (1938) Berliner Großkaufleute und Kapitalisten. Band II: Die Zeit des Merkantilismus 1648–1806.
- Ris, E. (2016) Eremitage aus Berlin. Die Gemäldesammlung von Johann Ernst Gotzkowsky als Grundstock der Bildergalerie der russischen Zarin Katharina II. in St. Petersburg.
- Roberds, W & S. Quinn (2012) Responding to a Shadow Banking Crisis: The Lessons of 1763. FRB Atlanta Working Paper Series No. 2012-8
- Schepkowski, N.S. (2009) Johann Ernst Gotzkowsky. Kunstagent und Gemäldesammler im friderizianischen Berlin. Akademie-Verlag, Berlin. ISBN 978-3-05-004437-8.
- Schnabel, I. & H.S. Shin (2004) Liquidity and Contagion: The Crisis of 1763
- Sieveking, H. (1933) Die Hamburger Bank 1619 – 1875, p. 70-71. In: Festschrift der Hamburgischen Universität ihrem Ehrenrektor Herrn Bürgermeister Werner von Melle.
- Skalweit, S. (1937) Die Berliner Wirtschaftkrise von 1763 und ihre Hintergründe.
- Spooner, F. C. 2002. Risks at Sea: Amsterdam insurance and maritime Europe, 1766–1780. Cambridge University Press.
