= Amsterdam banking crisis of 1763 =

Financial crisis in the Netherlands

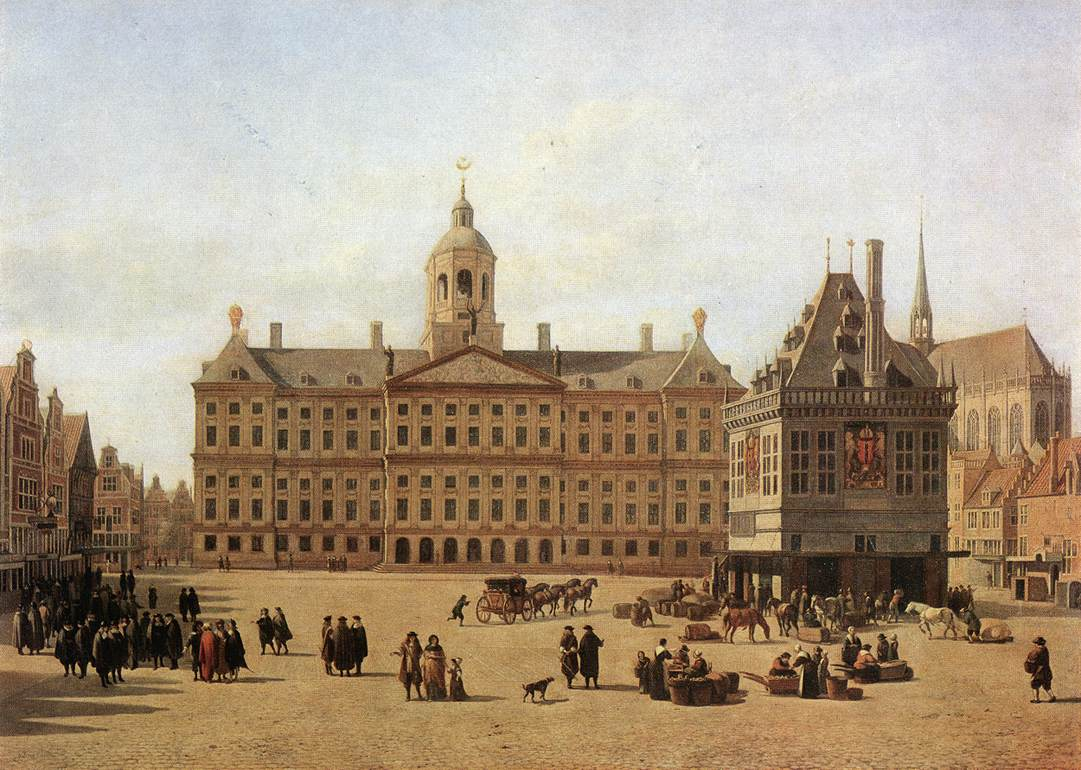
Dam square and town hall by Gerrit Berckheyde - Gemäldegalerie Alte Meister (Dresden)

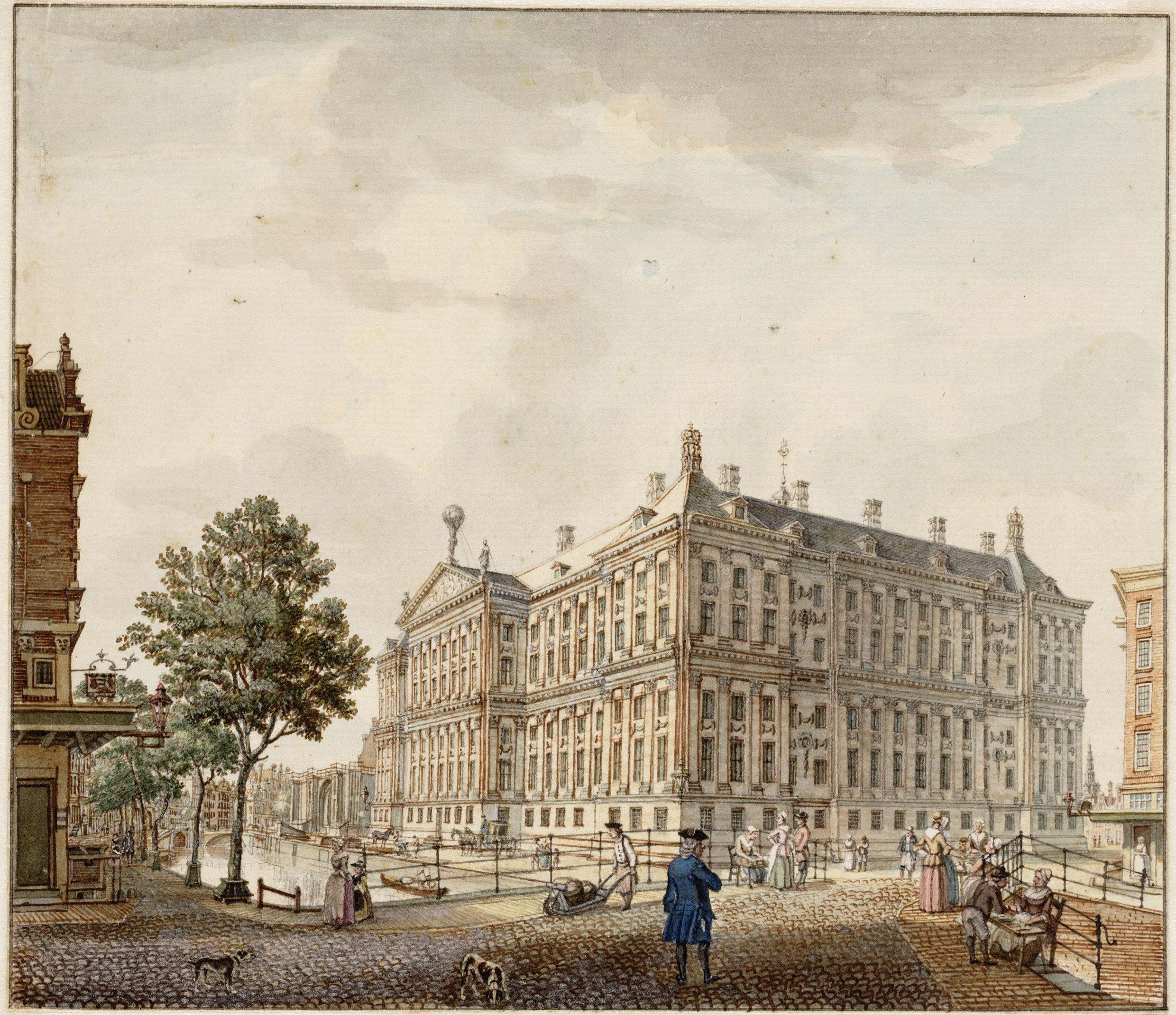
The southside of the Amsterdam townhall, where the Wisselbank was located. Print by Jan de Beijer (1758)

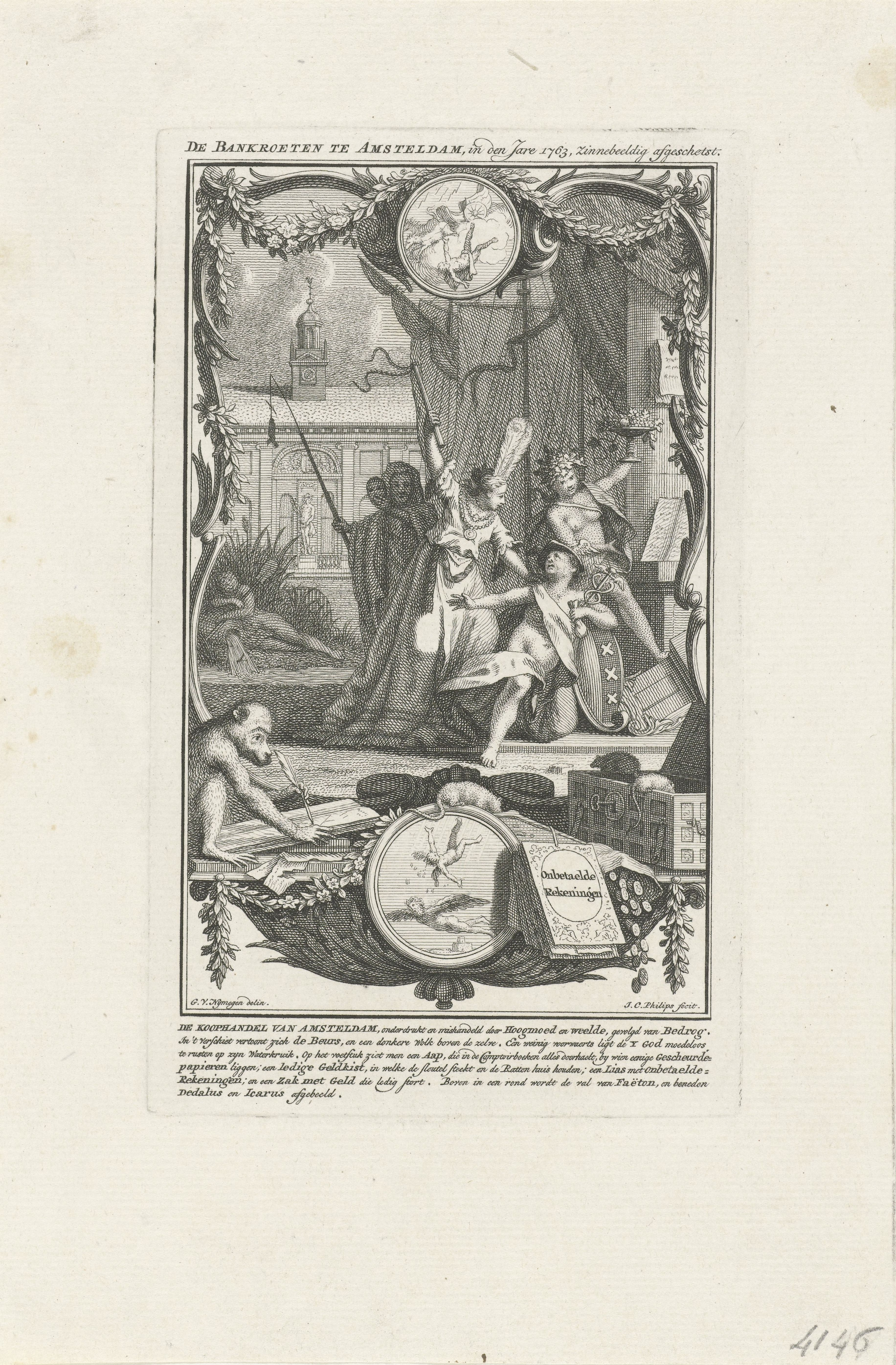
Allegorie op de bankroeten te Amsterdam door de wissel en -windhandel, 1763. De Bankroeten te Amsterdam, in den Jare 1763, zinnebeeldig afgeschetst.

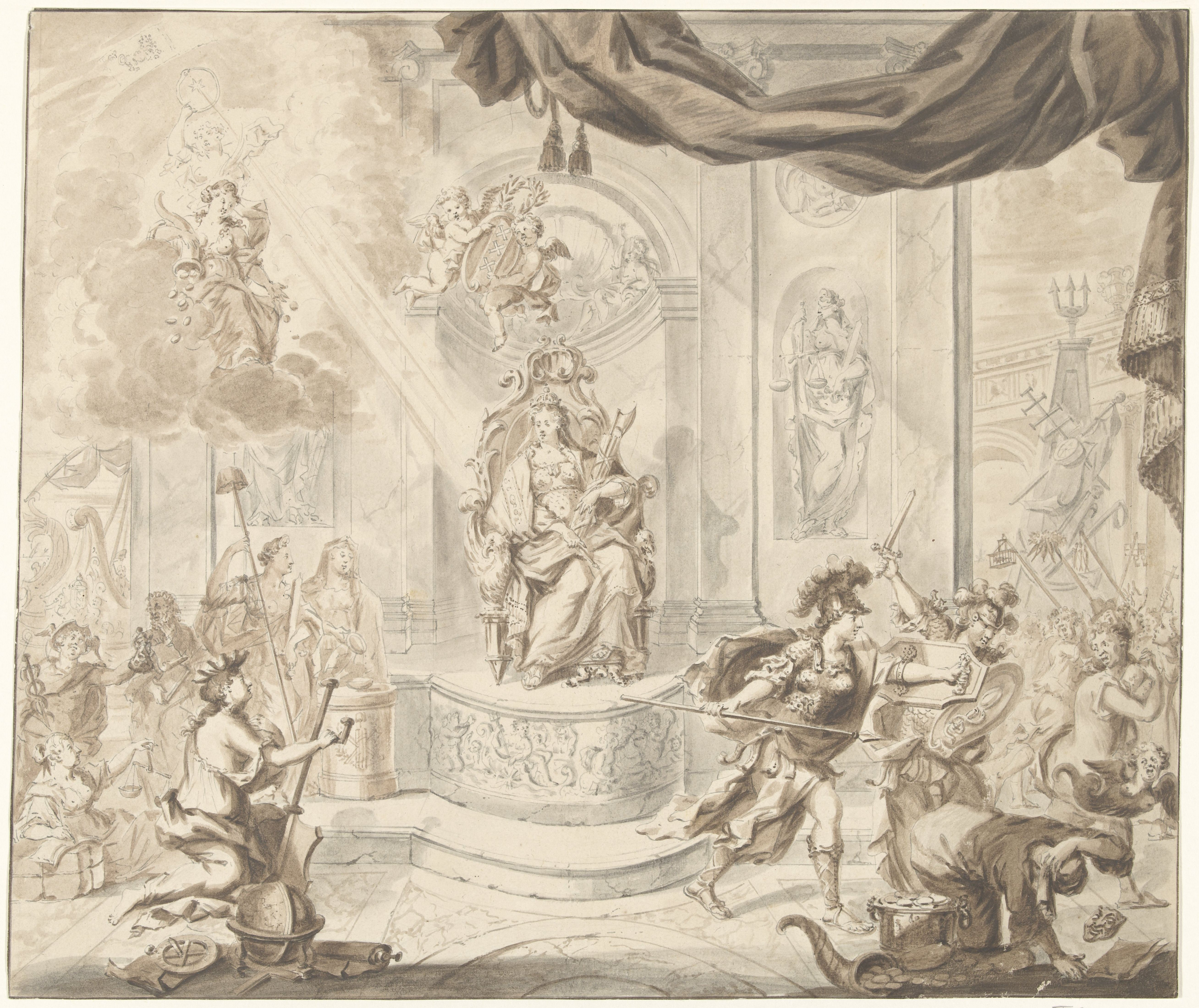
Allegorie op de verdrijving van de wind- en wisselhandelaren van Amsterdamse beurs, 1763

The Amsterdam banking crisis of 1763 in the Netherlands followed the end of the Seven Years' War. At this time prices of grain and other commodities were falling sharply, and the supply of credit dried up due to the decreased value of collateral goods. Many of the banks based in Amsterdam were over-leveraged and were interlinked by complex financial instruments, making them vulnerable to a sudden tightening of credit availability.

The crisis was marked by the failure of one large bank – that of De Neufville – and many smaller financial enterprises. The extent of the crisis was mitigated by the provision of additional liquidity by the Bank of Amsterdam, the Dutch central bank. Similarities have been identified between these events and the 2008 financial crisis.

== Background ==
On 10 February 1763, the Treaty of Hubertusburg was signed between Prussia, Austria and Saxony. This Treaty marked the end of the Seven Years' War, a war from 1756 to 1763 that involved all of the major European powers of the period. Berlin then became an emerging market, and Amsterdam’s merchant bankers were the primary sources of credit, with the Hamburg banking houses serving as intermediaries between the two. But early 1763, because of the end of the war, the abnormal high war prices plummeted by 30%; grain lost its value rapidly in May. Two months later more than 30 banking and trade firms went bankrupt, with an estimated debt of 10 million Dutch guilders.

Some Amsterdam merchant bankers were leveraged far beyond their capacity. Financial activity in late-eighteenth-century Amsterdam was controlled by a group of merchant banking firms. These “bankers” were proprietary firms that dealt in trade goods and that also provided financing to other merchants. These firms were not deposited banks in the English conventional tradition, as deposit taking was viewed as incredibly risky. Since deposits were scarce, financial intermediation was accomplished through a securitization scheme known as the acceptance loan. The building block of the acceptance loan was an instrument known as the bill of exchange – ultimately a contract to pay a fixed sum of money at a future date. Bills of exchange were originally designed as short-term contracts but gradually became heavily used for long-term borrowing. They were typically rolled over and became de facto short-term loans to finance longer-term projects, which resulted in the creation of a classic balance sheet maturity mismatch. At that time, bills of exchange could be re-sold, with each seller serving as a guarantor to the bill and, by implication, insuring the buyer of the bill against default. This practice prevented the circulation of low-credit-quality bills among market participants and created a kind of “credit wrapper”—a guarantee for the specific loan—by making all signatories jointly liable for a particular bill. In addition, low acceptance fees—the fees paid to market participants for taking on the obligation to pay the bill of exchange—implied a perceived negligible risk. However, the complexity of this system had underlying ramifications – the practice also resulted in binding market participants together through their balance sheets: one bank might have a receivable asset and a payable liability for the same bill of exchange, even when no goods were traded. By the end of the Seven Years' War in 1763, high leverage and balance sheet interconnectedness left merchant bankers highly vulnerable to any slowdown in credit availability.

Merchant bankers believed that their balance sheet growth and leverage were hedged and insured through offsetting claims and liabilities. And while some of the more conservative Dutch bankers were wary in growing their wartime business, others expanded quickly. One of the fastest-growing merchant banks belonged to the De Neufville brothers, who speculated in depreciating currencies and endorsed a large number of bills of exchange. Leendert Pieter de Neufville was the leading perpetrator of the proliferation of the faulty bills of exchange. Noting his success, other merchant bankers followed suit.

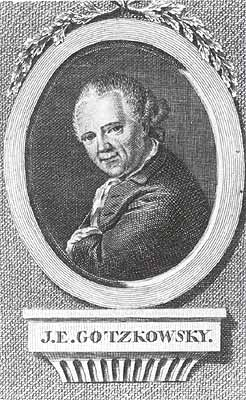

On 19/20 April Gotzkowsky bought a huge amount of grains (oats) through the intermediation of the Russian envoy Vladimir Sergeevich Dolgorukov (1717 - 1803). It was stored in Kolberg and along Pommeranian coast, sitting unused after the Russian army had left the Poland. Both Russia and Prussia were hoping for a swift sale, that would allow for a discharge of the troops who had to guard these supplies. Because of a grain shortage and famine in Prussia, the transaction could have been profitable for Gotzkowsky and De Neufville, the latter one secretly collaborating with two partners Stein and Leveaux, all collectors of art. Neufville paid 100,000 guilders down payment (in exchange bills) on behalf of the buying syndicate. The remaining one million guilders were to be paid by Gotzkowsky in four terms, within a year. Two Russian traders, Svešnikov and Rogovikov, would take over a 1/5 of the total grain sold. The remaining 4/5 was allocated to Gotzkowsky, De Neufville, Leveaux and Stein. The contract was signed by just two men: Gotzkowsky and Svešnikov.

On 12 April 1763, Frederick decided to dump his unused wartime grain supplies in Lower Silesia, leading in the next months to a 75% drop in the local price of wheat, with other commodities prices soon following. On June 27, 1763, the Gotzkowsky transaction became a state affair. Legal problems meant that the grain could not now be exported. When it became clear that half of the grain was of bad quality, Gotzkowsky wanted to change the contract and offered to pay only 2/3 of 1.170.448 guilders owed? He would have been satisfied if he did not suffer any loss. On 18 July the Russian senate refused this offer and insisted on being paid promptly and demanded payment in Dutch guilders, and not in debased Saxon coins.

When Leveaux and Von Stein dropped out of the grain deal it must have come as a shock to De Neufville and Gotzkowsky. The restructuring of the Gotzkowsky deal put tremendous pressure on De Neufville, who then became responsible for 3/5 of the deal. Gotzkowsky had lent at least two million Reichstaler to Saxony to pay its war contribution to Frederick. Gotzkowsky had not yet sold all the municipal bonds he had received in return. Gotzkowsky had also an impressive number of paintings in stock which he accumulated during the war and managed a silkworks, a jewelry business, a porcelain factory (now KPM) that was not running at his satisfactory, all at the same time. By the end of July 1763, both Gotzkowsky and De Neufville had difficulty finding the 700.000 guilders needed to settle their obligations and feared they would go bankrupt.

The failure of a firm of De Neufville’s size – almost half as large as the Bank of Amsterdam itself – shocked the markets. The immediate victims were a group of firms known as “cashiers.” The cashiers were about 30–40 financial intermediaries whose activities formed a bridge between the large banks and merchants. Traditionally, the cashiers had served as brokers in the market for bank funds. By the last half of the eighteenth century, their activities had expanded to include the settlement of bills denominated in current guilders, deposit taking, and even the issue of cashier’s receipts that circulated locally as banknotes. The cashiers were run hard during the first days of the crisis, as panicked holders of cashier’s receipts demanded coin from the issuers. The contraction of the bill market put the Amsterdam merchant bankers under heavy pressure, as their ability to roll over funding was several constricted.

== Policy response ==
The post-Neufville credit freeze-up ultimately forced 38 Amsterdam firms into bankruptcy during August and September 1763. Compared to Neufville, however, these were small enterprises, and many were able to reopen within a few months, after settling with creditors. By October, there are signs of the market returning to a more “normal” state, albeit at lower levels of activity than before. Scholars argue that a major reason for the comparatively mild impact of the panic in Amsterdam was the provision of liquidity through the Bank of Amsterdam, which was able to compensate for a shortage of market liquidity. This was accomplished by two methods: the first being the traditional repo window for trade coins. The second was the novel idea of a repo window for unminted silver bullion (the bullion window was authorized on 4 August).

Coin deposits at the Bank of Amsterdam functioned much as modern central bank repurchase transactions. Differently from the usual practice of modern central banks, however, the Bank did not try to actively vary the terms of its coin window. Nor did it attempt to manage the number of receipts outstanding, but simply allowed these to adjust to market conditions. Thus, when Neufville collapsed, bankers, to maintain their overall balances, created two million new bank guilders by bringing coin collateral into the bank.

The second operation used to restore damages from the Neufville failure was the bullion window. In short, the policy dilemma facing the Bank of Amsterdam in 1763 an extraordinary demand for central bank balances, combined with a surfeit of collateral, only most of it not eligible for transactions with the central bank. Thus, the improvised solution was for the Bank to expand its repo window to include unminted bullion. In designing this program, a key political constraint was that the bank did not undercut the business of the mints, a major source of governmental revenue. Combined, these two solutions helped curb the effects of the failure of the de Neufville banking house.

Overall there were many lessons learned by the Crisis. A combination of the system including the securitization of numerous embedded liabilities, a large shock to collateral values, and erratic policy decisions all came together to produce the Crisis. The trigger is provided by the collapse of the Neufville bank, which was too “interconnected to fail.” The solution of providing unlimited amounts of liquidity (coin repo window), on fixed terms, was a brilliant strategy and one that would be replicated during the 2008 Crisis. As well, the bullion window, though used lightly, was effective for its limited purpose. These two liquidity measures dually prevented additional failures of major market participants.

== Sources ==
- "The Amsterdam Banking Crisis of 1763." The Amsterdam Banking Crisis of 1763. N.p., n.d. Web. 23 Apr. 2014.
- Jong-Keesing, Elisabeth Emmy de "De Economische Crisis van 1763 te Amsterdam". Internationale Uitgevers- en Handelmaatschappij, Amsterdam (1939): n. pag. Web.
- Kynaston, David (2017). Till Time's Last Sand: A History of the Bank of England, 1694–2013. New York: Bloomsbury. pp. 38–39. ISBN 978-1408868560.
- Narron, James, and David Skeie. "Crisis Chronicles: The Commercial Credit Crisis of 1763 and Today’s Tri-Party Repo Market." Liberty Street Economics. Federal Reserve Bank of New York, 7 Feb. 2014. Web. 23 Apr. 2014.
- Quinn, Stephen, and Williams Roberds. "Responding to a Shadow Banking Crisis: The Lessons of 1763." Texas Christian University, Department of Economics (2012): n. pag. Print.
- "Shadow Banking Crisis of 1763. Amazing Similarities with Lehman Crisis of 2008." Mostly Economics. N.p., n.d. Web. 23 Apr. 2014.
