= Seyler family =

Swiss family

Coat of arms of the Seyler (Seiler) family of Liestal, Switzerland

The Seyler family (also spelled Seiler) is a Swiss family, originally a patrician family from Liestal near Basel. Family members served as councillors and Schultheißen of Liestal from the 15th century, later also as members of the Grand Council of Basel. A Hamburg branch descended from the banker and renowned theatre director Abel Seyler became by marriage a part of the Berenberg banking dynasty, co-owners of Berenberg Bank and part of Hamburg's ruling class of Hanseaten.

== History ==
Among the earliest known family members are Johannes Seyler, who was a councillor in Liestal in 1445, and Martin Seyler, a Schultheiß (mayor) of Liestal in 1477. Balthasar Seyler (died 1460) was a canon and dean of the Stift of St. Peter.

Magister Friedrich Seyler (1603–1676), a native of Basel, first served as parish priest of Bichwyl and Lütisburg in St. Gallen, later as teacher and rector of the Schule auf Burg gymnasium in Basel, and then again as parish priest, and obtained the Basel burghership in 1670. He was married to Rosina Stöcklin (1612–1681), daughter of the Basel council member Matthys Stöcklin (1577-1649), and they were the parents of Margaretha Seyler (1639–1695), who married Professor of Ethics, Rhetoric and Law Simon Battier (1629–1681), and of the noted Calvinist theologian Friedrich Seyler (1642–1708).

Friedrich Seyler was pastor at St. Peter's Church in Basel and wrote a history of Anabaptism and a refutation of Anabaptist "errors." In 1672, he married Elisabeth Socin (born 1655), who belonged to an Italian-origined noble family and who was the daughter of the Basel judge, member of the Grand Council and envoy to the French court Abel Socin (1632–1695) and Maria Hummel (1635–1681), as well as a niece of Basel burgomaster Emanuel Socin.

Friedrich Seyler and Elisabeth Socin were the parents of the theologian Abel Seyler (1684–1767), who was parish priest of Frenkendorf-Munzach in the Liestal district of Basel from 1714 to 1763. Abel Seyler was married to Anna Katharina Burckhardt (1694–1773), a member of the Basel patrician Burckhardt family and the daughter of Johann Rudolf Burckhardt and Anna Maria Merian, and granddaughter of Susanna Faesch. Anna Katharina Burckhardt was a descendant of the famous publisher and humanist Johann Froben and many of her ancestors had been councillors and burgomasters of Basel.

Abel Seyler the Elder and Anna Katharina Burckhardt were the parents of Elisabeth Seyler (1715–1798), married to parish priest Daniel Merian (1700–1779), and businessman and famed theatre director Abel Seyler (1730–1801).

=== Abel Seyler and the Hamburg branch of the family ===
A silhouette of Abel Seyler

Abel Seyler (1730–1801) emigrated from Liestal to Hamburg and established himself as a wealthy businessman there. He established the bank Seyler & Tillemann with his business associate Johann Martin Tillemann, which speculated heavily on currency debasement during the Seven Years' War. The company went spectacularly bankrupt in what was termed a "malicious bankruptcy" with 3 million Mark Banco, an enormous sum, in debts, but Seyler and Tillemann were able to retain some of their fortunes. Subsequently, Seyler devoted himself completely to the theatre, first as the main financial backer of the Hamburgische Entreprise (the Hamburg National Theatre), collaborating closely with its dramaturge Gotthold Ephraim Lessing, and subsequently as the founder and director of the Seyler theatrical company, becoming "the leading patron of German theatre" in his lifetime and employing some of Germany's foremost actors, playwrights and composers. Abel Seyler is also credited with introducing Shakespeare to a German language audience. He inter alia commissioned the play Sturm und Drang by Klinger, that gave its name to the era.

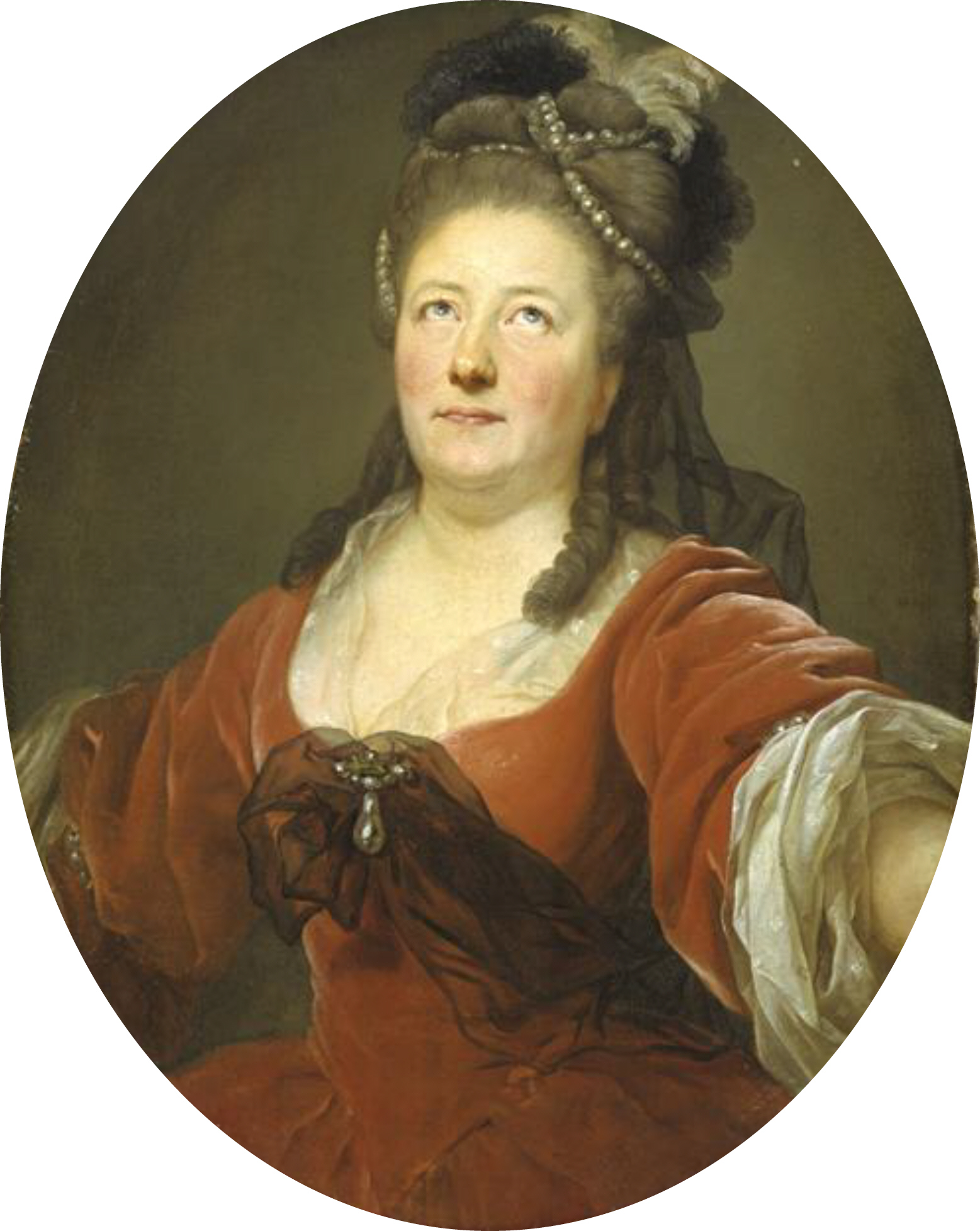
Actress and playwright Friederike Sophie Seyler (1737/38–1789), painted by Anton Graff, Kunsthalle Hamburg

In 1754, Abel Seyler married Sophie Elisabeth Andreae (1730–1764), the daughter of the wealthy Hanover court pharmacist Leopold Andreae (1686–1730) and the sister of the renowned natural scientist J.G.R. Andreae. They were the parents of two sons and a daughter, the court pharmacist and Illuminati member Abel Jacob Gerhard Seyler, the prominent Hamburg banker Ludwig Erdwin Seyler (1758–1836) and Sophie Marie Katharina Seyler (1762–1833). Following the death of their mother in 1764, the Seyler children grew up with their uncle J.G.R. Andreae in Hanover and hardly saw their biological father for the rest of his life. In 1772, Abel Seyler married his long-time mistress Friederike Sophie Seyler (1737/1738–1789), who was alongside Friederike Caroline Neuber Germany's leading actress of the 18th century, and who wrote the Singspiel Hüon und Amande that was a major inspiration for the libretto of the opera The Magic Flute. They had no children.

The oldest son of Abel Seyler, Abel Jacob Gerhard Seyler (1756–1805), was court pharmacist in Celle 1791–1803 and also inherited the Andreae & Co. pharmacy with his two siblings as co-heirs, which was sold in 1803. He was married to Karoline Auguste Luise Klügel (1770–1841), a daughter of the noted mathematician and physicist Georg Simon Klügel. Their only son was Georg August Wilhelm Seyler (1800–1866), a doctor of theology and pastor in Annaburg. He was married (1826) to Klara Franziska Hoppe, a daughter of the Freiburg superintendent (bishop) Ernst August Dankegott Hoppe. Georg Seyler became a second father to his wife's orphaned younger siblings, and in 1864 he formally adopted his 25 years younger brother in law, the later noted physiologist and chemist Felix Hoppe-Seyler, who added the Seyler name to his birth name.

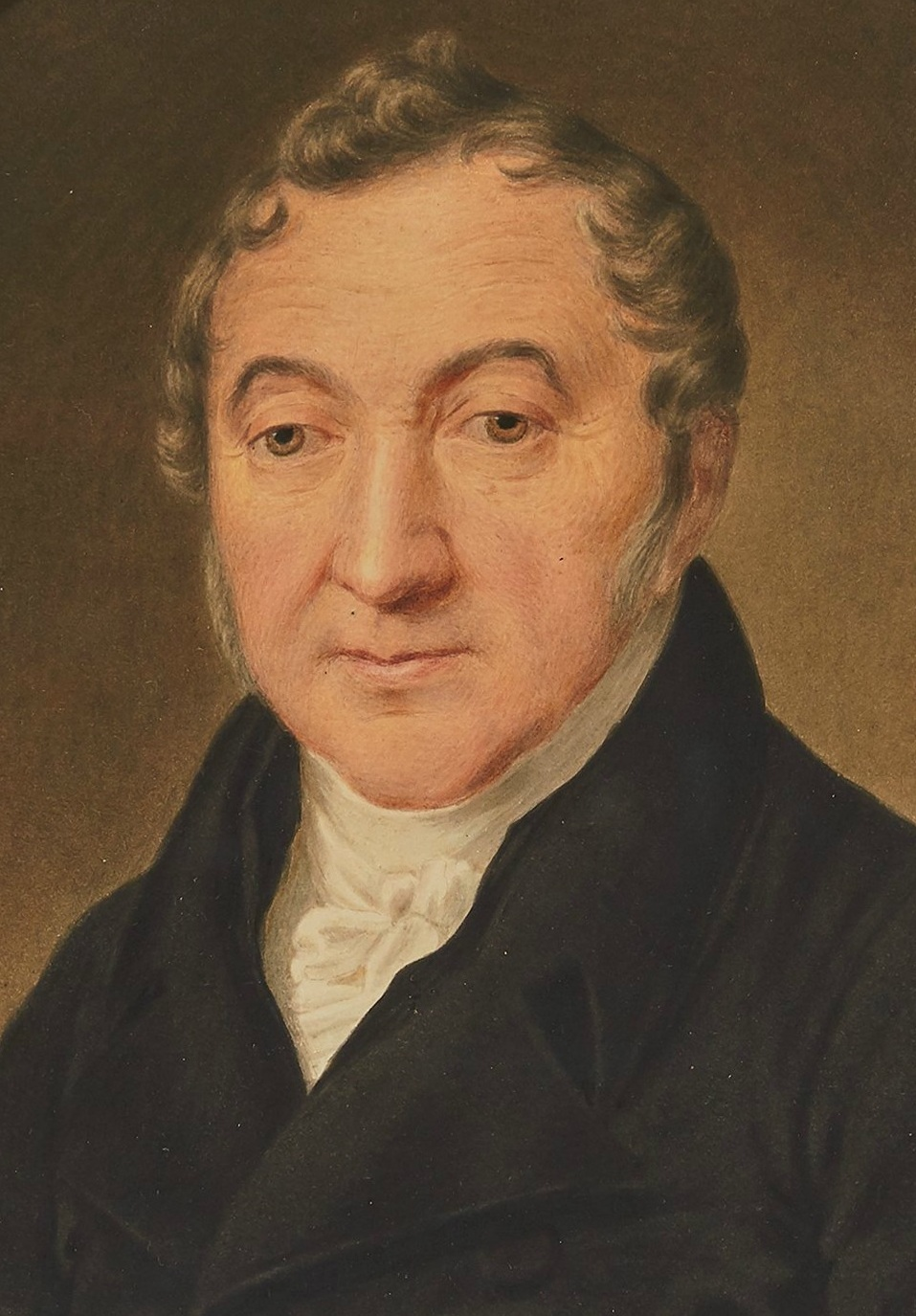
Ludwig Erdwin Seyler, head and co-owner of Berenberg Bank

The second son of Abel Seyler, Ludwig Erdwin Seyler (1758–1836), was married to Anna Henriette Gossler (1771–1836), a member of the Hamburg Hanseatic Berenberg-Gossler banking dynasty, who was the eldest daughter of banker Johann Hinrich Gossler and Elisabeth Berenberg (1749–1822). Elisabeth Berenberg was the only heir of the Flemish-origined Berenberg banking family of grand burghers who established Berenberg Bank in 1590, and her grandfather Rudolf Berenberg had become a senator in 1735. She was also descended from the Welser family. Johann Hinrich Gossler had become owner of the bank by marrying her in 1768, as her father had no male heirs and as the Hamburg branch of the Berenberg family was becoming extinct in the male line. In 1788, Gossler took on Seyler, his son-in-law, as the new partner, and following Gossler's death in 1790, Ludwig Seyler became head of the firm. Ludwig Seyler served, inter alia, as President of the Commerz-Deputation (1817–18), one of Hamburg's three main political bodies, and as a member of the Hamburg Parliament (Erbgesessene Bürgerschaft). He was the brother in law of Hamburg senator Johann Heinrich Gossler and the uncle of First Mayor (head of state) Hermann Gossler.

Ludwig Seyler and Anna Henriette Gossler were the parents of

- Sophie Henriette Elisabeth ("Betty") Seyler (1789–1837), who married Hamburg businessman Gerhard von Hosstrup, who founded the Hamburger Börsenhalle in 1804. Their daughter Bertha von Hosstrup (1814–1902) was married to the legal scholar and politician Albert Hänel.
- Auguste Seyler, who married Gerhard von Hosstrup after the death of her sister
- Louise ("Wischen") Seyler (1799–1849), who married ship broker Ernst Friedrich Pinckernelle (1787–1868), whose sons founded the G. & J. E. Pinckernelle insurance broker firm
- Henriette Seyler (1805–1875), who married the Norwegian industrialist Benjamin Wegner (1795–1864), a co-owner of Blaafarveværket, Hassel Ironworks and the Hafslund estate, and owner of Frogner Manor
- Emmy Seyler, married Homann
- Molly Seyler

The only daughter of Abel Seyler, Sophie Marie Katharina Seyler (1762–1833), who was regarded as strikingly beautiful, was married (1781) to their distant relative, the Sturm und Drang poet Johann Anton Leisewitz, the author of Julius of Taranto. They had no children.

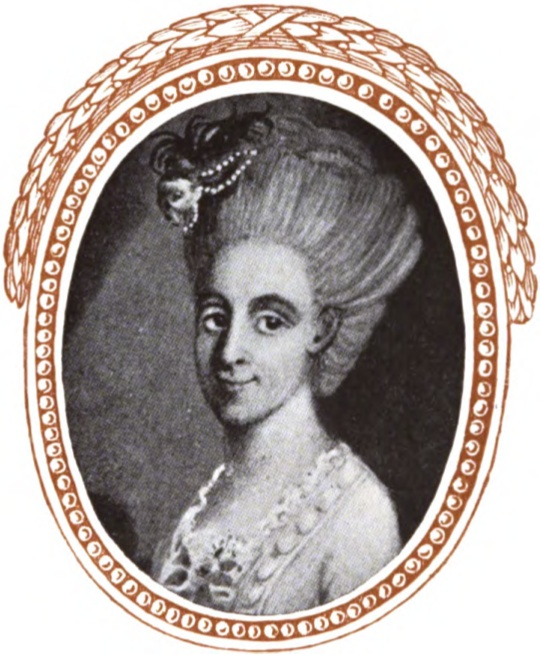
Sophie Seyler, wife of Johann Anton Leisewitz

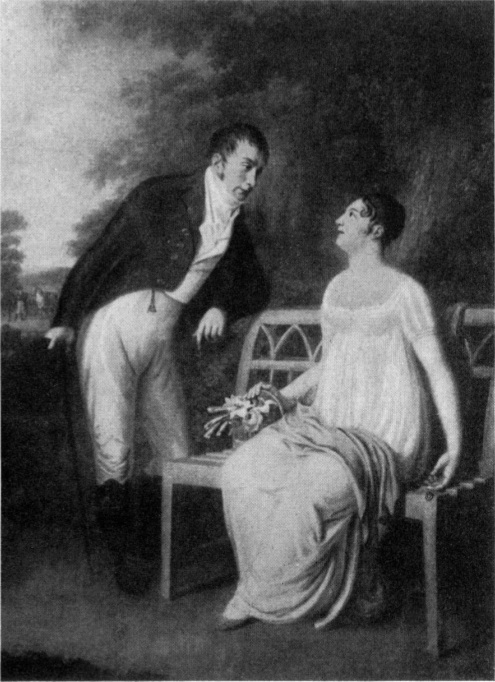
Elisabeth Seyler (1789–1837), daughter of Berenberg Bank owner L.E. Seyler and Anna Henriette Gossler, and her husband Gerhard von Hosstrup, painted ca. 1815 by Friedrich Carl Gröger

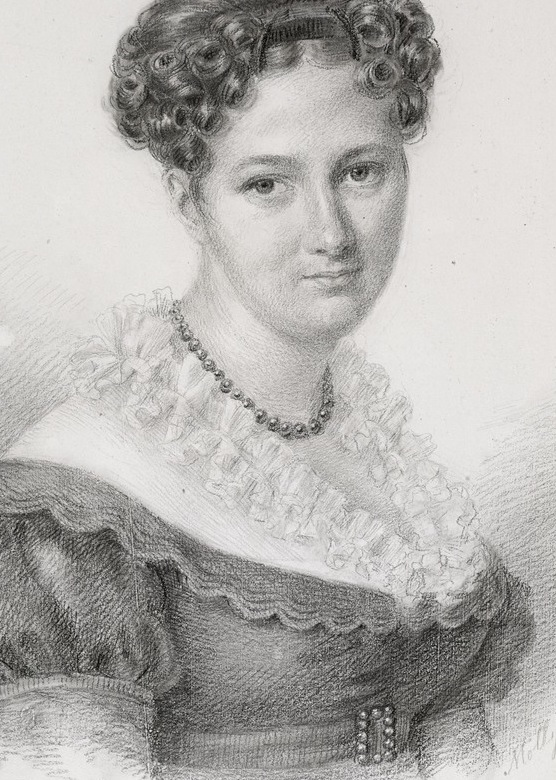
Henriette Seyler (1805–75, married to industrialist Benjamin Wegner), daughter of Berenberg Bank owner L.E. Seyler and Anna Henriette Gossler, drawn by her sister Molly in 1827

== Coat of arms ==
Gules, a rising deer, argent, with antler and cloven hooves, Or, that is, a rising white deer with golden antler and cloven hooves in a red shield. Sometimes the arms also includes a green base or mountain, e.g. in the arms of mayor of Liestal Adam Seiler from 1587.

== Lineage ==
- Jacob Seiler (born in the 1570s, died 1610), married Barbara Dietler
  - Friedrich Seyler (1603–1676), Magister, rector of the Schule auf Burg gymnasium, married Rosina Stöcklin (1612–1681), daughter of Basel councillor Matthys Stöcklin (1577-1649) and Margret Kündig (b. 1583)
    - Margaretha Seyler (1639–1695), married Simon Battier (1629–1681), Professor of Ethics, Rhetoric and Law
    - Friedrich Seyler (1642–1708), Calvinist theologian, married Elisabeth Socin (born 1655), daughter of Basel judge, member of the Grand Council and envoy to the French court Abel Socin (1632–1695) and Maria Hummel (1635–1681)
      - Maria Rosina Seiler (1674–1703), married parish priest Johann Rudolf Brenner (1670–1737)
      - Elisabeth Seiler (1675–1711), married Johann Heinrich Krug (1652–1703)
      - Friedrich Seiler (born 1679), merchant, married Anna Stähelin and Anna Maria Passavant
        - (of first marriage) Elisabeth Seiler (1709–1743), married Johann Rudolf Burckhardt (1706–1765)
      - Abel Seyler (1684–1767), Dr.theol., parish priest in Liestal, Basel, married Anna Katharina Burckhardt (1694–1773), daughter of Johann Rudolf Burckhardt and Anna Maria Merian
        - Elisabeth Seyler (1715–1798), married parish priest Daniel Merian (1700–1779)
        - Abel Seyler (1730–1801), businessman, subsequently theatre director, married Sophie Elisabeth Andreae (1730–1764), daughter of the Hanover court pharmacist Leopold Andreae (1686–1730) and Katharina Elisabeth Rosenhagen (died 1752), and in his second marriage actress Friederike Sophie Seyler (née Sparmann)
          - (of first marriage) Abel Jacob Gerhard Seyler (1756–1805), court pharmacist and member of the Illuminati, married Karoline Auguste Luise Klügel (1770–1841), daughter of mathematician and physicist Georg Simon Klügel
            - Georg August Wilhelm Seyler (1800–1866), doctor of theology and pastor in Annaburg, married Klara Hoppe, daughter of Freiburg superintendent (bishop) Ernst August Dankegott Hoppe
              - Felix Hoppe-Seyler (1825–1895), physiologist and chemist, adopted son, biological younger brother of his wife
          - (of first marriage) Ludwig Erdwin Seyler (1758–1836), head and co-owner (1788–1836) of Berenberg Bank, married Anna Henriette Gossler (1771–1836), daughter of banker Johann Hinrich Gossler and Elisabeth Berenberg
            - Sophie Henriette Elisabeth ("Betty") Seyler (1789–1837), married businessman Gerhard von Hosstrup
            - Johann Hinrich Seyler
            - Emilie ("Emmy") Seyler, married to the physician Ludwig Friedrich Christian Homann
            - Louise Auguste Seyler, married to Gerhard von Hosstrup after the death of her sister
            - Maria ("Molly") Seyler
            - Louise ("Wischen") Seyler (1799–1849), married shipbroker Ernst Friedrich Pinckernelle
            - Henriette Seyler (1805–1875), married the Norwegian industrialist Benjamin Wegner
          - (of first marriage) Sophie Marie Katharina Seyler (1762–1833), married poet and lawyer Johann Anton Leisewitz
      - Benedikt Seiler (born 1687), Spezierer, married (1714) Anna Cath. Fuchs (1679–1763)
        - Friedrich Seiler (1715–1777), wig maker, married (1738) Maria Marg. Bossert (1714–1789)

== See also ==
- Berenberg-Gossler-Seyler banking dynasty
- Seyler theatrical company

== Literature ==
- "Seiler, auch Seyler," in Allgemeines Helvetisches, Eydgenössisches, Oder Schweitzerisches Lexicon (1747–1765), XVII, pp. 42–45
- Seiler, in Historiches Lexikon der Schweiz
- A. Seiler-Rosenmund, Stammbaum der Bürgergeschlechter von Liestal, vol. 1, 1908, pp. 111–119
- Josef Widmann, Bürger-Familienbuch von Liestal, Lüdin & Walser, 1860
- Auszug Stamm Seiler in / aus Liestal, stroux.org

Hamburg branch

- Magazin zur Geschichte des deutschen Theaters, 1773, VI, pp. 264–276
- Percy Ernst Schramm, Neun Generationen: Dreihundert Jahre deutscher Kulturgeschichte im Lichte der Schicksale einer Hamburger Bürgerfamilie (1648–1948), Vol. I, Göttingen, 1963
- Percy Ernst Schramm, Kaufleute zu Haus und über See. Hamburgische Zeugnisse des 17., 18. und 19. Jahrhunderts, Hamburg, Hoffmann und Campe, 1949
- Percy Ernst Schramm, "Kaufleute während Besatzung, Krieg und Belagerung (1806–1815) : der Hamburger Handel in der Franzosenzeit, dargestellt an Hand von Firmen- und Familienpapieren." Tradition: Zeitschrift für Firmengeschichte und Unternehmerbiographie, Vol. 4. Jahrg., No. 1. (Feb 1959), pp. 1–22. https://www.jstor.org/stable/40696638
- Percy Ernst Schramm, "Hamburger Kaufleute in der 2. Hälfte des 18. Jahrhunderts," in: Tradition. Zeitschrift für Firmengeschichte und Unternehmerbiographie 1957, No 4., pp. 307–332. https://www.jstor.org/stable/40696554
