= Ludwig Erdwin Seyler =

Merchant banker and politician in Hamburg, Germany

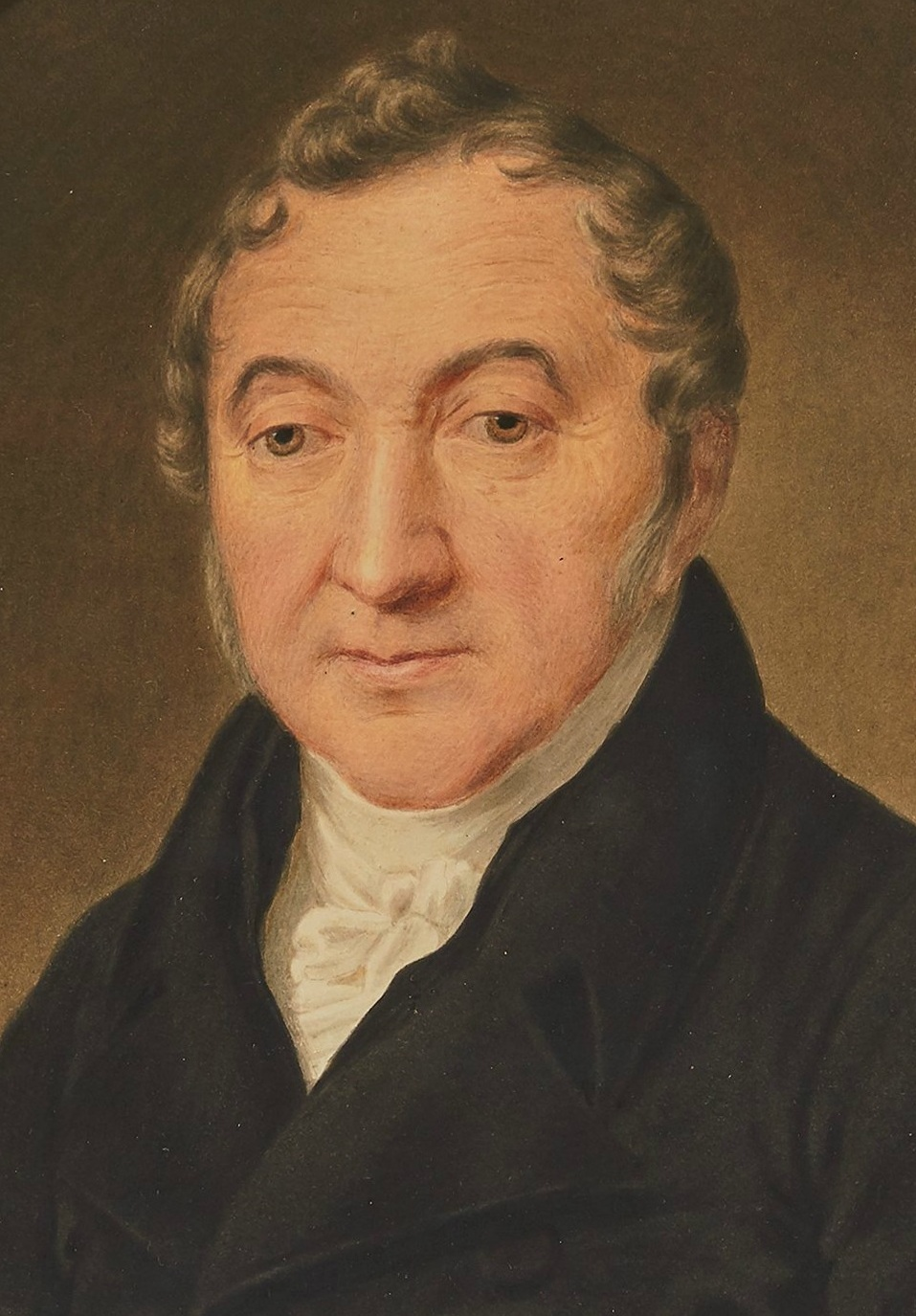

Councillor (Senator) of Hamburg
- In office 1813–1814

President of the Hamburg Commercial Deputation
- In office May 1817 – July 1818
- Preceded by: Jacob Albers
- Succeeded by: Richard Parish

Member of the Hamburg Parliament
- In office 1814–1818

Personal details
- Born: 15 May 1758 Hamburg
- Died: 26 October 1836 (aged 78) Hamburg

Ludwig Erdwin Seyler (15 May 1758 – 26 October 1836; often known as L.E. Seyler) was a Hamburg merchant, merchant banker and politician. He was by marriage a member of the Hanseatic Berenberg dynasty, and was a partner in the Hamburg firm Joh. Berenberg, Gossler & Co. (now known as Berenberg Bank) for 48 years (1788–1836), for 46 years as the company's senior partner. The company name was amended in 1791 to reflect him becoming a partner and has remained unchanged since; he "is practically the 'Co.' in the company name." Seyler was one of the first merchants and bankers from modern Germany to establish trade relations with the United States and East Asia. Much of the company's wealth derived from their position as leading sugar importers from the Americas to the North European market, in combination with their activities as merchants bankers. Seyler was one of Hamburg's leading merchants during the Napoleonic Wars and held several political offices. He served as a member of the French-appointed council of Hamburg and after the Napoleonic Wars as the President of the Commercial Deputation, one of the city-state's main political bodies. Ludwig Seyler was a son of the Swiss-born theatre director Abel Seyler and a son-in-law of the bankers Johann Hinrich Gossler and Elisabeth Berenberg through his marriage to their eldest daughter Anna Henriette Gossler.

== Background and early life ==
Ludwig E. Seyler was born in Hamburg and was the younger son of the Swiss-born Abel Seyler (1730–1800), one of the great theatre principals of 18th century Europe, and his Hanoverian wife Sophie Elisabeth Andreae (1730–1764). His father had been born in the Swiss Canton of Basel and had come to Hamburg as a young adult, where he had established himself as a merchant banker in the 1750s and 1760s. As a merchant banker Abel Seyler became highly controversial in Hamburg due to his "malicious" speculation in financial instruments, and in 1763 his companies went spectacularly bankrupt with enormous debts in the wake of the Amsterdam banking crisis of 1763. From 1767 Abel Seyler devoted himself entirely to the theatre, largely abandoning his children as he adopted a traveling lifestyle, moving from court to court with the Seyler Theatre Company.

Following the death of their mother in 1764, Ludwig Seyler and his brother and sister were raised in Hanover by their maternal uncle, the noted Enlightenment natural scientist J.G.R. Andreae. By several accounts Andreae was a highly erudite and kind man who became a loving father figure to his sister's children; he had no children of his own. Their father, Abel Seyler, remarried in 1772 to Friederike Sophie Seyler, Germany's leading actress of the second half of the 18th century and the author of the opera Oberon, a major influence on the libretto of The Magic Flute.

On his father's side Seyler was descended from many of Basel's leading patrician families, especially the families Seyler, Burckhardt, Socin (originally an Italian noble family), Merian and Faesch; Cardinal Joseph Fesch, Napoleon's uncle, was a distant relative. On his mother's side he was a grandson of the Hanoverian court pharmacist Leopold Andreae. His sister Sophie Seyler (1762–1833) was married to the Sturm und Drang poet Johann Anton Leisewitz, the author of Julius of Taranto. Felix Hoppe-Seyler, the principal founder of biochemistry and molecular biology, was an adopted son of his nephew.

Ancestors of Ludwig Erdwin Seyler

Friedrich Seyler theologian and parish priest in Basel
Abel Seyler; Dr.theol., parish priest in the Canton of Basel
Elisabeth Socin from Basel
Abel Seyler theatre principal from the Canton of Basel
Johann Rudolf Burckhardt from Basel
Anna Katharina Burckhardt from Basel
Anna Maria Merian from Basel
Ludwig Erdwin Seyler
Ernst Leopold Andreae court pharmacist in Hanover
Heinrich Leopold Andreae court pharmacist in Hanover
Maria Wietzendorf from Lüneburg
Sophie Elisabeth Andreae from Hanover
Katharina Elisabeth Rosenhagen

== Joh. Berenberg, Gossler & Co. ==
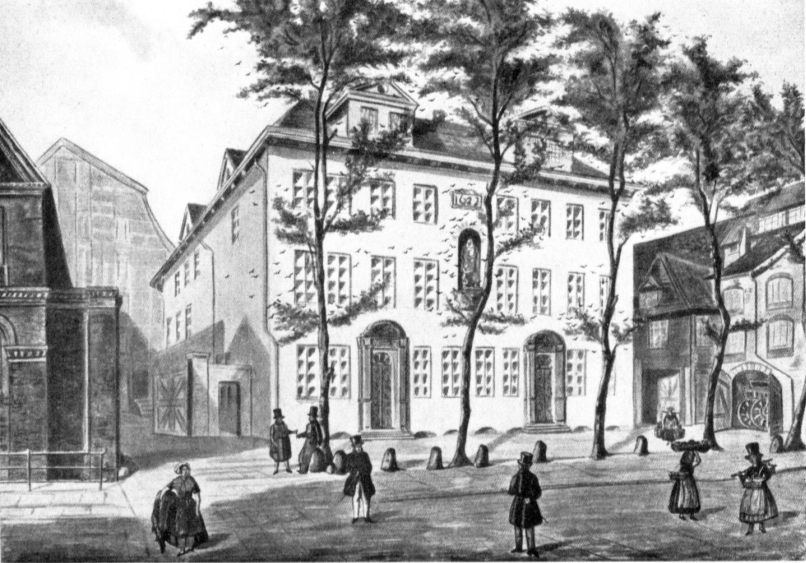
Mortzenhaus, city residence of the Gossler family and head office of Berenberg Bank from 1788

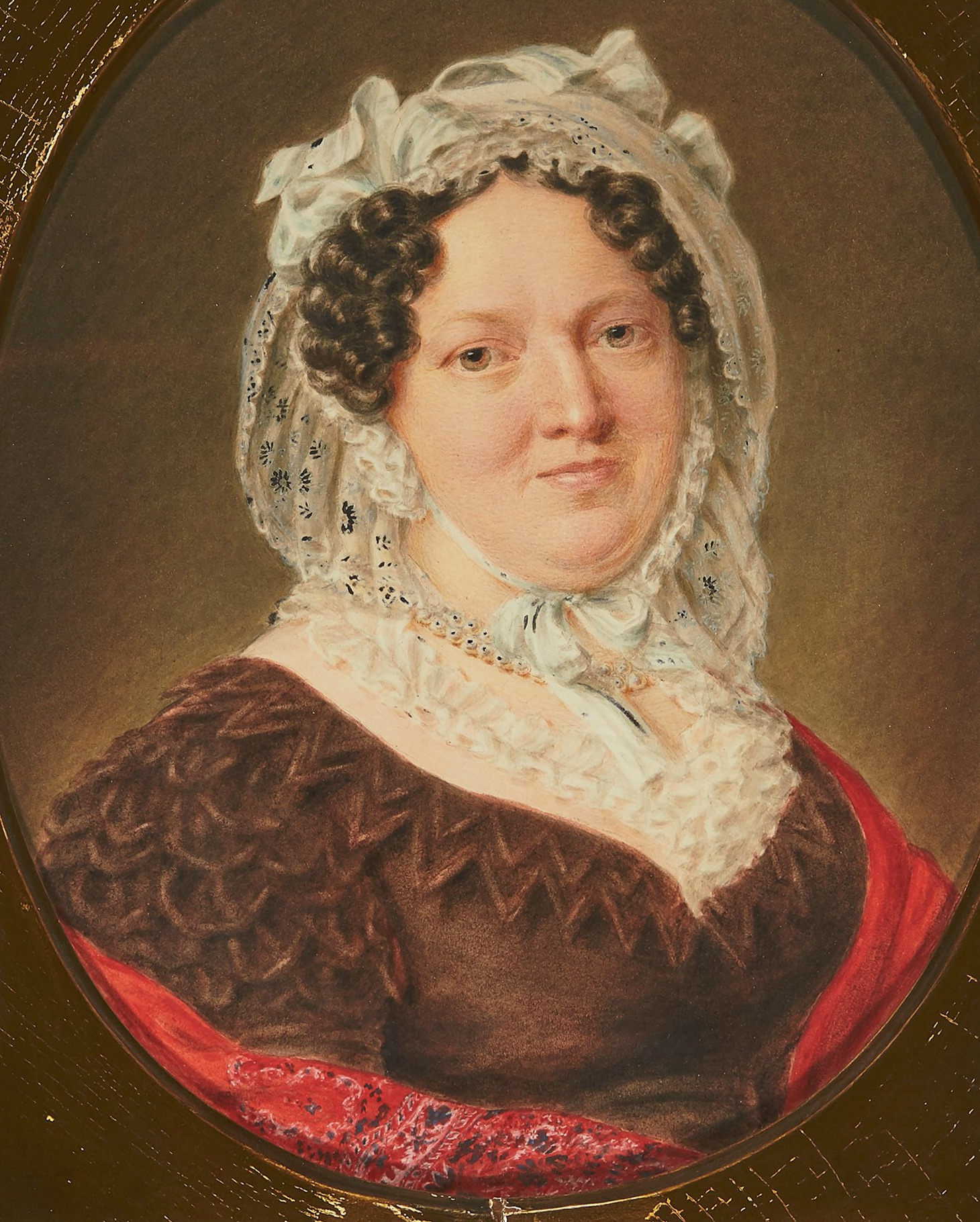
His wife Anna Henriette Gossler, eldest child of Johann Hinrich Gossler and Elisabeth Berenberg

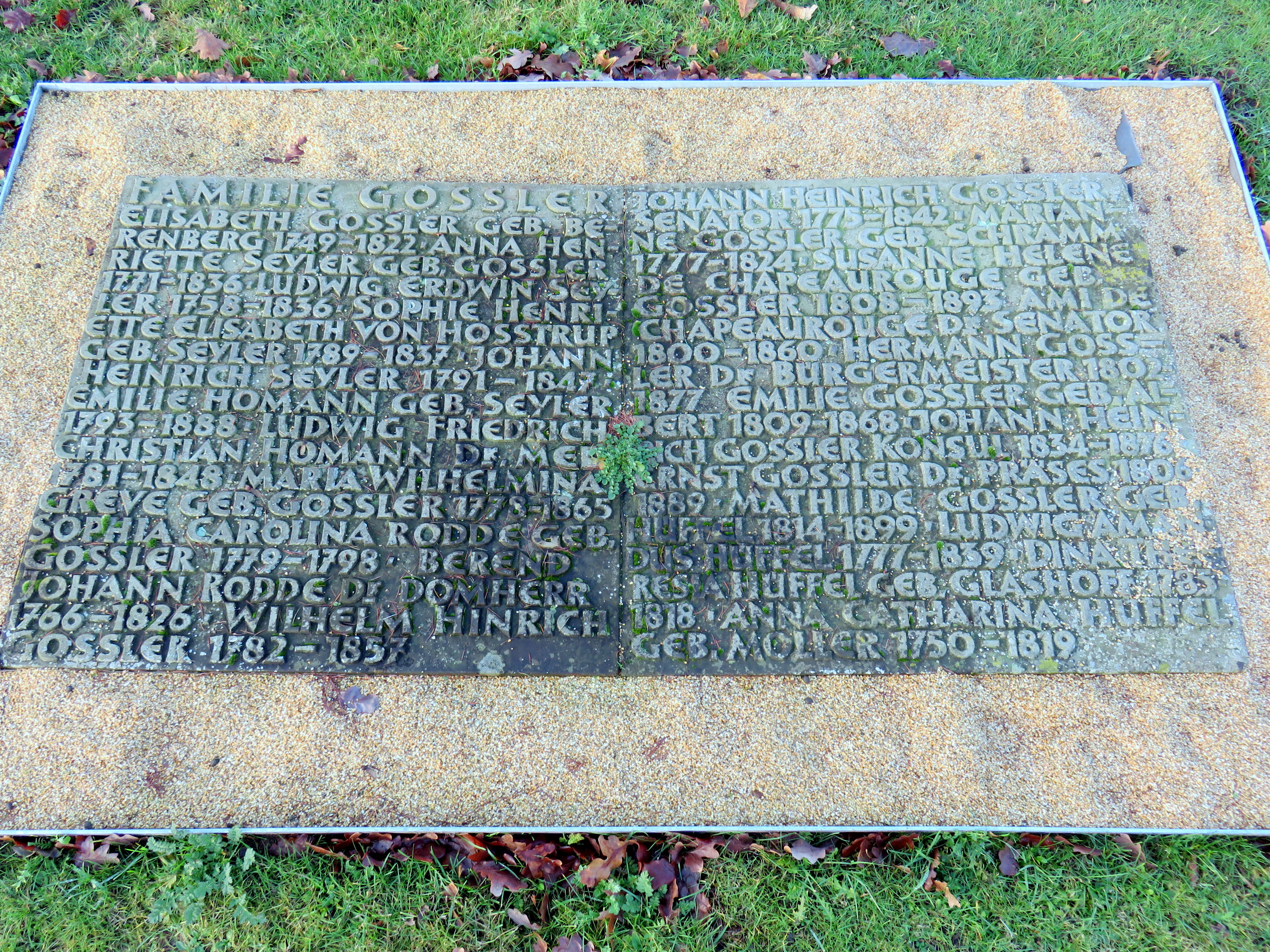
Grave of the Gossler family, including Ludwig Erdwin Seyler, his wife Anna Henriette née Gossler, his mother-in-law Elisabeth Berenberg, his brother-in-law Senator Johann Heinrich Gossler and his nephew First Mayor (head of state) Hermann Gossler

He joined the Berenberg & Gossler company in Hamburg as an apprentice in 1775, aged 17. At the time the company's sole owner was his would-be father-in-law Johann Hinrich Gossler (1738–90), who had been named a partner by his own father-in-law Johann Berenberg (1718–72) in 1769. The company was founded in 1590 by the immigrant Berenberg family from Antwerp. On 20 May 1788, Seyler married Anna Henriette Gossler (1771–1836), the eldest child of the company's owners, Johann Hinrich Gossler and Elisabeth Berenberg (1749–1822). His mother-in-law was the only heir of the Berenberg family. During his lifetime and beyond his wife's family was regarded as one of the two most prominent families of the city-state of Hamburg.

Shortly after his marriage, his father-in-law made him a partner in the Berenberg company. Upon the death of his father-in-law in 1790, he succeeded him as the company's senior partner and effective head. His mother-in-law was a partner in her own right from 1790 to 1800, and in 1798 his seventeen years younger brother-in-law, the later senator Johann Heinrich Gossler, joined the company as a partner. Under his leadership and to reflect his entry into the partnership the company name was changed to Joh. Berenberg, Gossler & Co. in 1791, and has remained unchanged since.

As head of the Berenberg company Seyler greatly expanded the company's international trade, and was one of the first merchants and bankers from Germany who established trade relations with the newly independent United States and with East Asia. By 1800 the capital of the company had doubled since he became a partner, to about a million Mark Banco, and had established itself as one of the largest merchant houses of Hamburg. The company lost half its capital during the Napoleonic Wars, but quickly regained and exceeded its former size once the war ended. Astrid Petersson notes that the company's "extensive sugar imports in the period after 1814, especially from Brazil, the U.S. and East Asia, some of which represented a continuation of their trading relationships dating back to the late 18th century, contributed significantly to the company's wealth. In combination with their position as merchant bankers, it became a respected company well beyond the borders of Germany, that was only rivaled by few other merchant houses around 1830."

As of 1809 L.E. Seyler owned 5/12 (about 41%) of the Berenberg company and was the company's senior/managing partner and largest shareholder; his brother in law Johann Heinrich Gossler owned 4/12 (about 33%). Seyler remained one of the two dominant partners, with his brother-in-law, until his death in 1836. At the time of his death he had worked for the company for 61 years, been a partner for 48 years and been the company's senior partner for 46 years.

== Napoleonic Wars and politics ==
During the Napoleonic Wars Hamburg was occupied by France from 1806 and annexed into the Bouches-de-l'Elbe département of the First French Empire in 1811. The French government promoted the French language and instituted numerous changes in Hamburg. In February 1813 Seyler was appointed by the French authorities as a deputy judge on the commercial tribunal (tribunal de commerce). During the spring of 1813 he was among 30 prominent and wealthy Hamburg merchants who were briefly held as hostages by the French authorities to force the city to pay a "contribution" to the French government, which caused great consternation in Hamburg.

The Berenberg company's head office was moved to his home in Wandrahm in 1813 when the Gossler family's city residence, Mortzenhaus, was requisitioned by the French and turned into a military hospital. Seyler later moved the head office to the home of his son-in-law Gerhard von Hosstrup.

In the summer of 1813 he was appointed by the French Governor-General Louis-Nicolas Davout as a member of the municipal council (conseil municipal), the governing body of Hamburg which had replaced both the government (known as the council, later as the senate) and the parliament under French rule. He served in the municipal council until it was dissolved after the liberation of Hamburg, when Hamburg became a fully sovereign state. For a brief transition period, the former municipal councillors were asked to serve in the post-Napoleonic government.

On 23 March 1813 he was elected as a member of the Commercial Deputation and he served as its President from May 1817 to July 1818. The Commercial Deputation was one of the city-state's main political bodies. As a member of the Commercial Deputation he was also ex officio a member of the Hamburg Parliament in accordance with the city-state's post-Napoleonic constitution. He was also a member of the Banco Deputation, the commission that had the oversight over Hamburg's internationally used Banco currency, and of the Shipping and Port Deputation.

== Legacy ==
L.E. Seyler was highly regarded in Hamburg; he was described as "an honourable character, both as a merchant and as a human being."

Seyler is interred in the family grave of the Berenberg/Gossler family on the Old Hamburg Memorial Cemetery (Althamburgischer Gedächtnisfriedhof, formerly Ehrenfriedhof), together with his wife Anna Henriette née Gossler, his mother-in-law Elisabeth Berenberg and other relatives such as his brother-in-law, Senator Johann Heinrich Gossler and his nephew, Hamburg First Mayor Hermann Gossler. The grave is one of only six family graves on the memorial cemetery, which is reserved for notable Hamburg citizens.

== Issue and family ==
Ludwig Seyler and Anna Henriette Gossler had seven children, in order of birth

1. Sophie Henriette Elisabeth ("Betty") Seyler (1789–1837), married to Hamburg businessman Gerhard von Hosstrup, who founded the Hamburger Börsenhalle in 1804
2. Johann Hinrich Seyler
3. Emilie ("Emmy") Seyler, married to the physician Ludwig Friedrich Christian Homann
4. Louise Auguste Seyler, married to Gerhard von Hosstrup after the death of her sister
5. Maria ("Molly") Seyler
6. Louise ("Wischen") Seyler (1799–1849), married to ship broker Ernst Friedrich Pinckernelle (1787–1868), whose sons founded the G. & J. E. Pinckernelle insurance broker firm
7. Henriette Seyler (1805–1875), married to the Norwegian industrialist Benjamin Wegner (1795–1864) of Fossum Manor, later of Frogner Manor

His seven children were co-owners of Berenberg Bank from 26 October to 31 December 1836.

The co-founder of Commerzbank Ludwig Erdwin Amsinck (1826–1897), a son of his niece Emilie Amsinck née Gossler and business magnate Johannes Amsinck, was named after him. Ludwig Seyler was an uncle of Hamburg head of state Hermann Gossler.

== Portraits ==
Gouache portraits of Ludwig E. Seyler and his wife Anna Henriette Gossler from the Napoleonic era or its immediate aftermath were owned by the descendants of their daughter Henriette in Norway, and were sold through the Norwegian art broker Blomqvist in 2018. There also exist portraits of him and his two siblings as children, probably from the 1760s.

== Gallery ==
His father, the theatre director Abel Seyler

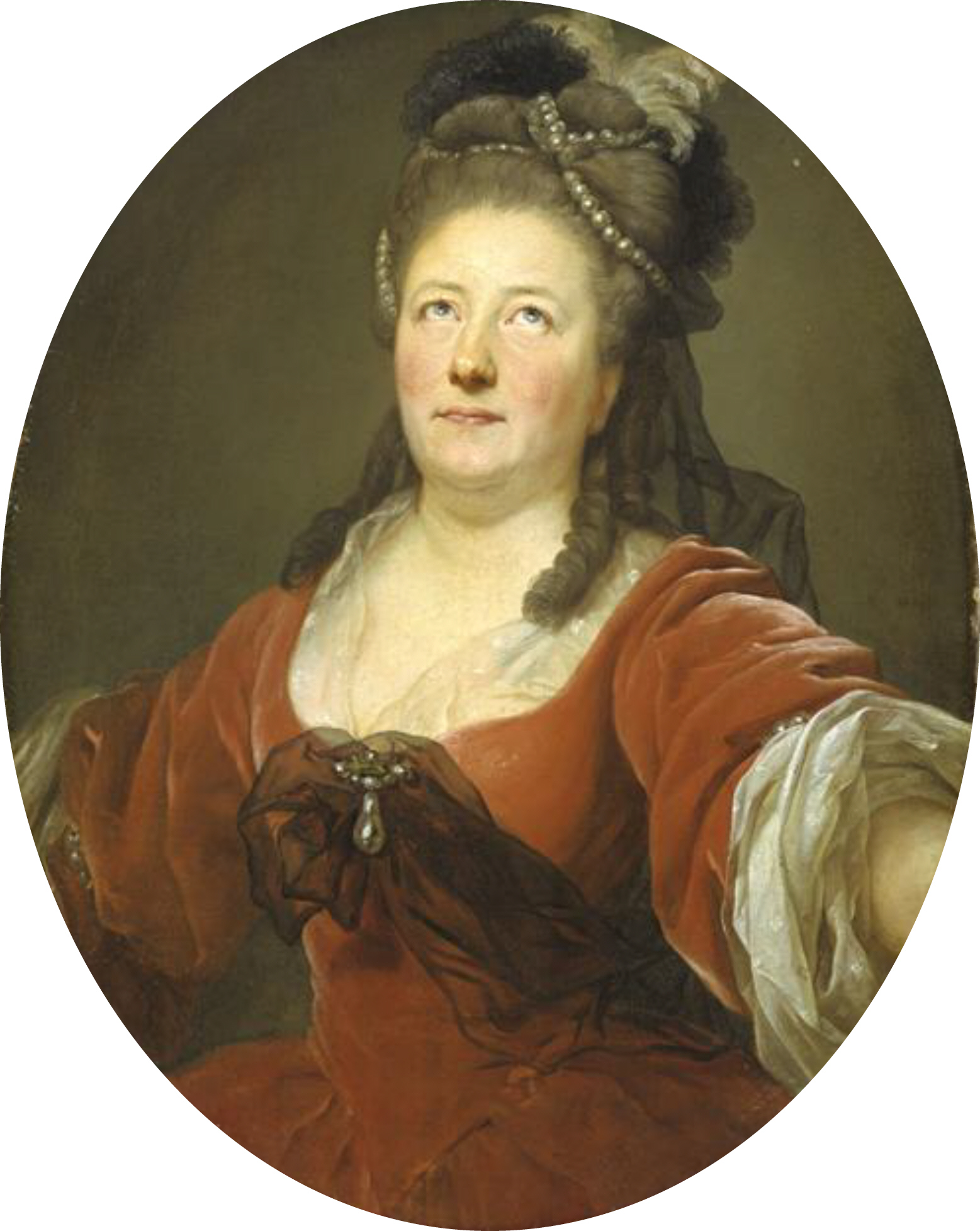
His father's second wife, the actress Friederike Sophie Seyler, author of Oberon

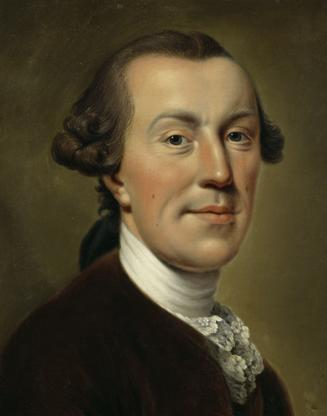
His uncle and foster father, the natural scientist and polymath J.G.R. Andreae

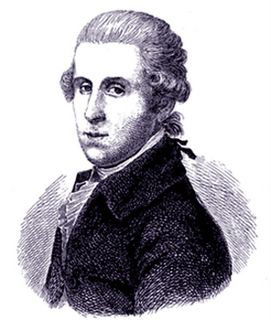
His brother-in-law, the poet Johann Anton Leisewitz, author of Julius of Taranto

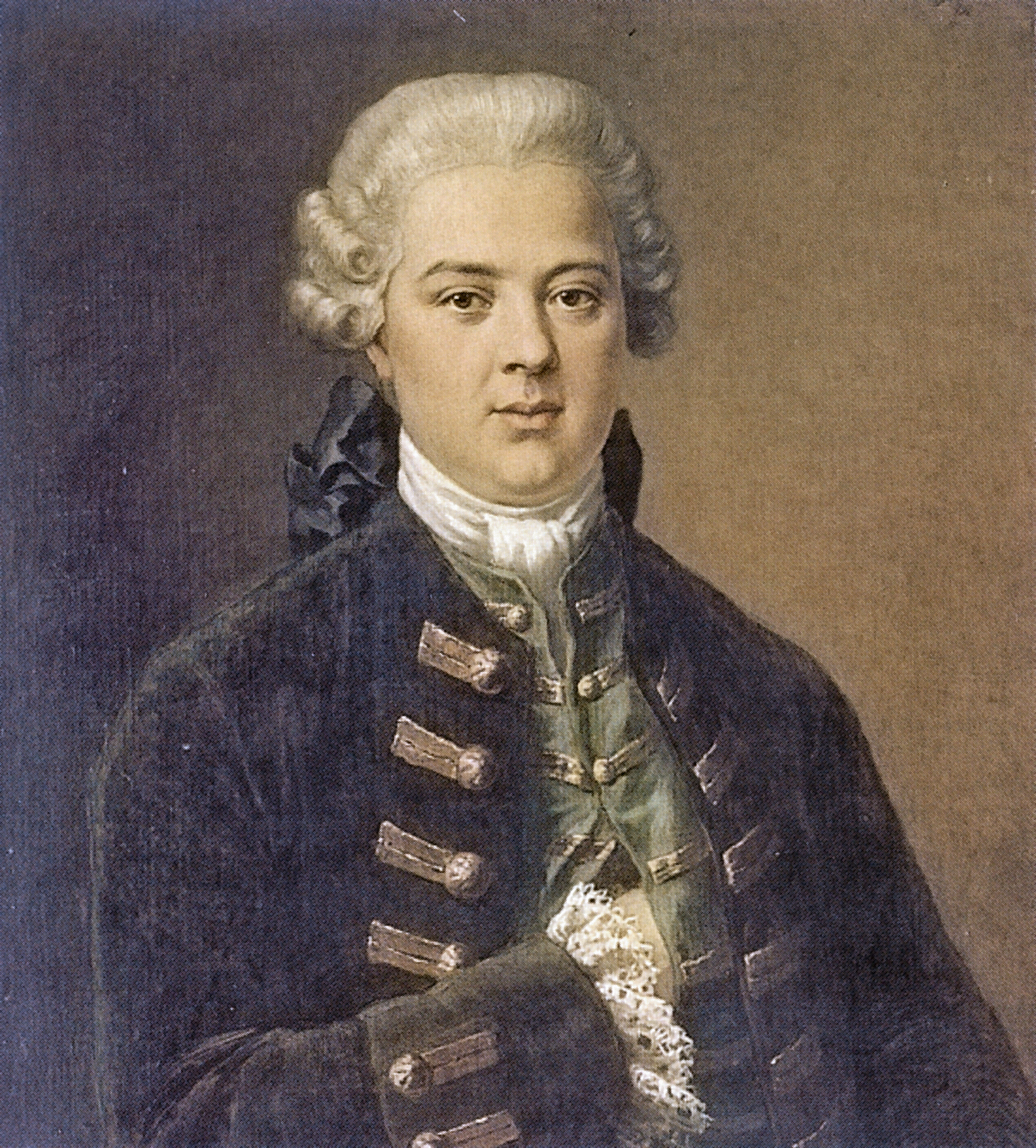
His father-in-law Johann Hinrich Gossler, owner of Berenberg Bank

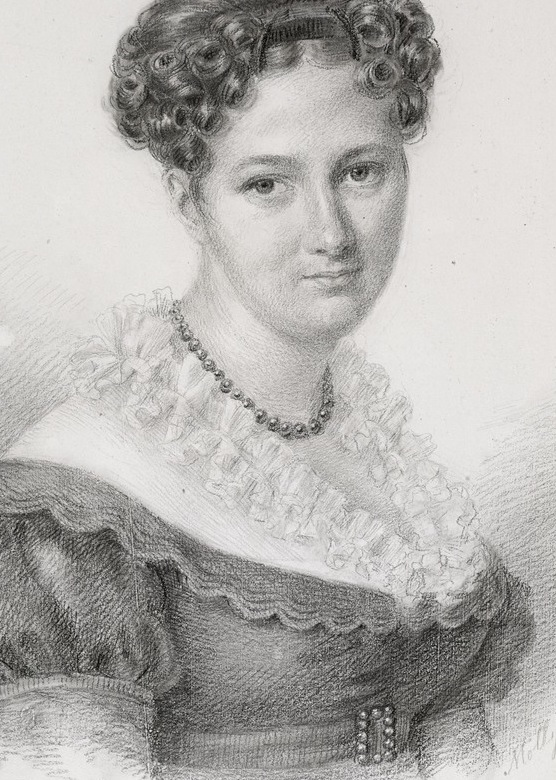
His daughter Henriette Seyler (1805–75, married Wegner) drawn by her sister Molly in 1822

== Ancestry ==
Ancestors of Ludwig Erdwin Seyler

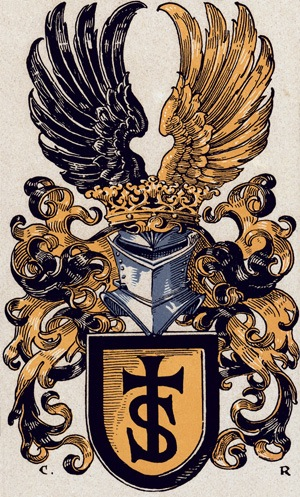
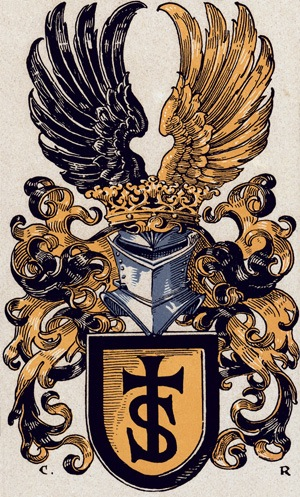
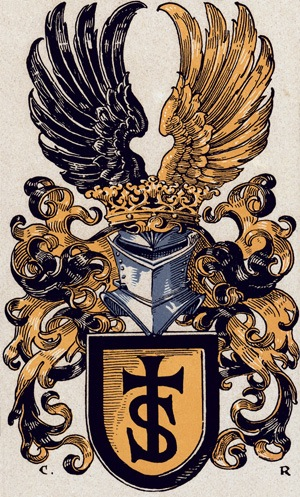
Friedrich Seyler (1603–1676), magister, parish priest, rector of the Basel Gymnasium
Friedrich Seyler (1642–1708), theologian and parish priest
Rosina Stöcklin (1612–1681)
Abel Seyler (1684–1767), Dr.theol, parish priest in the Canton of Basel
Abel Socin (1632–1695), Basel law lord and grand councillor, envoy to the French court
Elisabeth Socin
Maria Hummel (1635–1681)
Abel Seyler (1730–1801), merchant, theatre director
Samuel Burckhardt (1623–1685)
Johann Rudolf Burckhardt (1671–1698)
Katharina Parcus (1624–1685)
Anna Katharina Burckhardt (1694–1773)
Johann Jakob Merian (1648–1724)
Anna Maria Merian (1671–1698)
Susanna Faesch (1651–1682)
Ludwig Erdwin Seyler
Johann Andreae, court pharmacist in Hanover
Ernst Leopold Andreae (1640–), court pharmacist in Hanover
Leopold Andreae (1686–1730), court pharmacist in Hanover
Maria Wietzendorf (1660–)
Sophie Elisabeth Andreae (1730–1764)
Katharina Elisabeth Rosenhagen (–1752)

== See also ==
- Seyler family
- Gossler family
- Berenberg family
- Berenberg Bank

== Literature ==
- Percy Ernst Schramm, Neun Generationen: Dreihundert Jahre deutscher Kulturgeschichte im Lichte der Schicksale einer Hamburger Bürgerfamilie (1648–1948), Vol. I, Göttingen, 1963
- Percy Ernst Schramm, Kaufleute zu Haus und über See. Hamburgische Zeugnisse des 17., 18. und 19. Jahrhunderts, Hamburg, Hoffmann und Campe, 1949
- Percy Ernst Schramm, "Kaufleute während Besatzung, Krieg und Belagerung (1806–1815) : der Hamburger Handel in der Franzosenzeit, dargestellt an Hand von Firmen- und Familienpapieren." Tradition: Zeitschrift für Firmengeschichte und Unternehmerbiographie, Vol. 4. Jahrg., No. 1. (Feb 1959), pp. 1–22. https://www.jstor.org/stable/40696638
- Percy Ernst Schramm, "Hamburger Kaufleute in der 2. Hälfte des 18. Jahrhunderts," in: Tradition. Zeitschrift für Firmengeschichte und Unternehmerbiographie 1957, No 4., pp. 307–332. https://www.jstor.org/stable/40696554

Preceded by Jacob Albers	President of the Commerz-Deputation; May 1817–July 1818	Succeeded by Richard Parish
Preceded by Johann Hinrich Gossler (his father-in-law)	Head of Joh. Berenberg, Gossler & Co. 1790–1836	Succeeded by Johann Heinrich Gossler (his brother-in-law)
