= Georg Seyler =

German theologian and priest

- Born: 2 June 1800; Celle
- Died: 17 January 1866
- Father: Abel Seyler the Younger

Georg August Wilhelm Seyler (2 June 1800 in Celle – 17 January 1866) was a German theologian and priest, and the adoptive father of Felix Hoppe-Seyler, the principal founder of biochemistry and molecular biology.

== Biography ==
Georg Seyler was a son of the court pharmacist Abel Seyler the Younger and Caroline Klügel, and was a grandson of the famous theatre principal Abel Seyler and of the mathematician and physicist Georg Simon Klügel. He belonged to the originally Swiss Seyler family from Liestal and Basel. He was a nephew of the prominent Hamburg banker Ludwig Erdwin Seyler and of the Sturm und Drang poet Johann Anton Leisewitz.

He early took an interest in classics and literature, and was particularly influenced by Shakespeare and Goethe. From 1819, he studied theology at the University of Göttingen and the University of Halle. After earning a doctorate in theology, he entered the priestly seminary of Wittenberg. He was pastor in Annaburg from 1838 until his retirement in 1863.

He was married to Klara Hoppe, a daughter of the Freiburg bishop Ernst August Dankegott Hoppe, and a sister of the principal founder of biochemistry and molecular biology Felix Hoppe-Seyler (né Felix Hoppe). After the death of his parents-in-law, his 25 years younger brother-in-law lived with him and his wife for some time, and in 1864 he formally adopted his brother-in-law, who then added the Seyler name to his family name in gratitude.
