= Abel Seyler the Younger =

Abel Jacob Gerhard Seyler
- Born: 1756; Hamburg
- Died: 1805 (aged 48–49)
- Era: Age of Enlightenment
- Children: Georg Seyler
- Father: Abel Seyler

Abel Jacob Gerhard Seyler (1756–1805), also known as Abel Seyler the Younger, was a German scholar, pharmacist, freemason and a member of the original Illuminati order. Described as highly erudite, he was court pharmacist in Celle from 1791 to 1803, and also owned the famous Andreae & Co. court pharmacy in Hanover with his two siblings as co-owners from 1793 to 1803.

He was the oldest son of the Swiss-born banker turned theatre principal Abel Seyler and his first wife Sophie Elisabeth Andreae, and was a maternal grandson of the wealthy Hanover court pharmacist Leopold Andreae (1686–1730). He was a brother of the Hamburg banker Ludwig Erdwin Seyler and of Sophie Marie Katharina Seyler (1762–1833), who was married to the Sturm und Drang poet Johann Anton Leisewitz. After the death of their mother in 1764, he and his siblings grew up in Hanover with their uncle, the natural scientist Johann Gerhard Reinhard Andreae.

From 1777, he studied medicine at the University of Strasbourg and the University of Göttingen. He subsequently worked as a pharmacist in Hanover. In 1791, he was appointed as court pharmacist in Celle, a position he held until he retired in 1803. After the death of their uncle, he and his siblings inherited the Andreae & Co. pharmacy, and they appointed Philipp Friedrich David Murray (1770–1828) as its administrator. With a ducal privilege, Andreae & Co. was sold to Johann Ludewig Wilhelm Gruner in 1803.

On 24 October 1776 he joined the masonic lodge Zum schwarzen Bär in Hanover, and became Worshipful Master in 1778. He was acquainted with the Illuminati's founder Adam Weishaupt, and joined the Illuminati order in Gotha no later than 1784. His religious name was "Petrus Abaelardus," in honour of the medieval French scholastic philosopher Peter Abelard." His father was also a prominent figure in German freemasonry in the 18th century.

In his first marriage, he had two daughters. After the death of his first wife, he married Caroline (Augusta Louise) Klügel, a daughter of the mathematician and physicist Georg Simon Klügel, and they had one son, the priest Georg Seyler. The principal founder of biochemistry and molecular biology, Felix Hoppe-Seyler, was an adopted son of his son.
