= Friedrich Seyler =

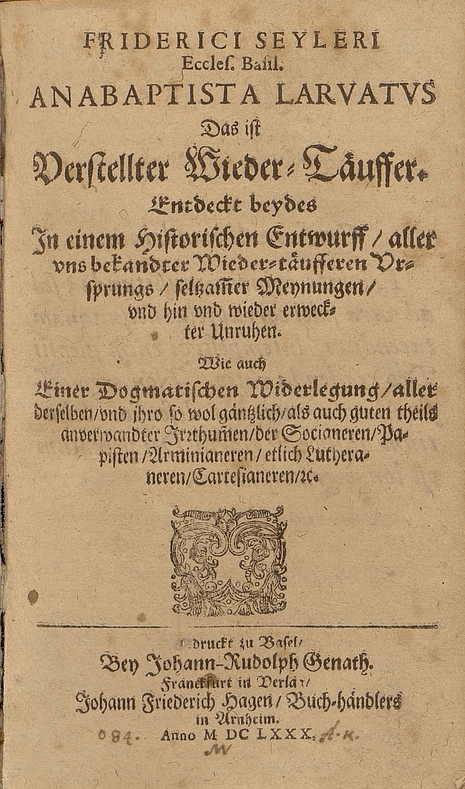
- Anabaptista larvatus by Friedrich Seyler
- Born: 13 December 1642
- Died: 31 January 1708 (aged 65)
- Other names: Friedrich Seiler, Fridericus Seilerus, Fridericus Seylerus
- Occupation: Swiss theologian

Friedrich Seyler (13 December 1642 – 31 January 1708), also spelled Friedrich Seiler, was a Swiss Reformed pastor and theologian from Basel, noted for his work Anabaptista Larvatus on Anabaptism.

== Anabaptista Larvatus ==
He is noted for his work Anabaptista Larvatus, a major polemical work on the history of Anabaptism and a refutation of Anabaptist "errors." The first part (182 pages) is a history of Anabaptism in 12 chapters, influenced notably by Heinrich Bullinger and Johann Heinrich Ottius. The second "Dogmatic Part" (510 pages) is a defense of the dogmatic doctrines disputed by the Anabaptists from the perspective of Reformed theology. The work addresses God and the Trinity, creation of Man, preservation and government of all things, Adam's fall, original sin, free will, redemption, election, scripture, saving faith, justification, incarnation, The Church, ministers, the ban or church discipline, baptism, communion, state, oath, and future life.

According to Harold S. Bender, "much more time is spent on the exposition and defense of the author's position as a Reformed theologian than on a statement of the Anabaptist position."

The work is dedicated to his father-in-law, the Basel judge and envoy to the French court Abel Socin (1632–1695) and Abel Socin's brother and burgomaster of Basel, Emanuel Socin. In the preface, Seyler writes that the Christian churches have never lacked enemies and persecutors, false teachers and erring spirits.

== Biography ==
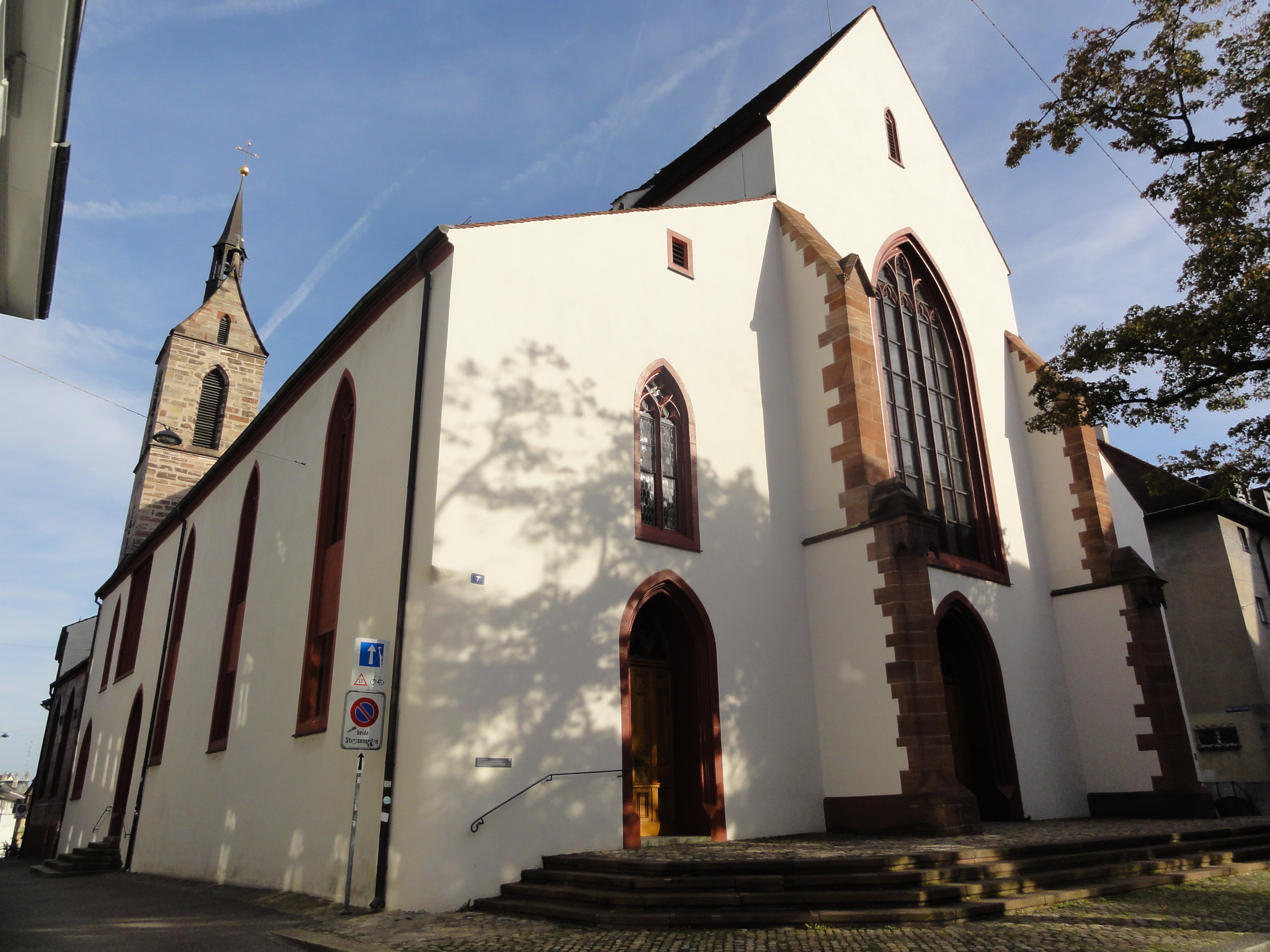
St. Peter's Church in Basel

He was matriculated at the University of Basel in 1656 and studied philosophy and theology, earned the degree Magister Artium in 1660 and was ordained as a Reformed priest in 1665. In the following years he travelled extensively in France, Flanders, Holland and Germany. Upon his return to Basel, he lectured privately on theology, until he was appointed as court preacher in Blotzheim in 1669, serving until 1671. He was a deacon at St. Theodor's Church in Basel 1671–1690 and St. Peter's Church in Basel 1690–1704, before he served as pastor at St. Peter's Church from 1704 until his death four years later.

He was the son of Magister Friedrich Seyler (1603–1676), parish priest and rector of the Schule auf Burg gymnasium in Basel. His mother Rosina Stöcklin (1612–1681) was the daughter of the Basel council member Matthys Stöcklin (1577–1649).

In 1672, he married Elisabeth Socin, of an Italian-origined noble family, and they were the parents of Dr.theol. Abel Seyler (1684–1767), parish priest in Liestal. Friedrich Seyler was the grandfather of the renowned theatre director Abel Seyler.

== Publications ==
- Friedrich Seyler, Bethesda für alle Elende und Krancke, Basel (Johann Rudolph Genath), 1674
- Friedrich Seyler, Anabaptista Larvatus, 769 pages, Basel (Johann Rudolf Genath) 1680 (also known as Wiedertäuffer-Geheimnusse)
- Friedrich Seyler, Roma titvbans Das ist/ Das Sinckend vnd zum gäntzlichen Undergang sich neigende Rom/ vnd heutige Römische Kirchen/ Oder Eine Historische Erklärung der Worten Johannis/ Apoc. XVIII. vers. 4. Vnd ich hörete eine Stim vom Himel/ zc., Basel (Johann Rudolph Genath), 1684
- Friedrich Seyler, Verfolgungs- oder Creuz-Loose auff dieser Erde, 1694
- Several published sermons

== See also ==
- Seyler family

== Literature ==
- Funeral sermon containing biographical information by Johann Rudolph Zwinger
