= Andreae & Co. =

German court pharmacy

- Industry: Pharmaceuticals
- Founded: 1639
- Founder: Dr. Joachim Jäger
- Headquarters: Hanover, Germany
- Owner: Andreae family

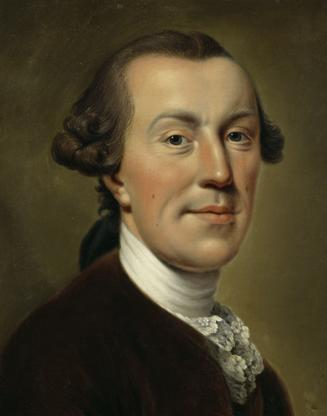
J.G.R. Andreae

Andreae & Co. (informally the Andreasche Apotheke or Andreae Pharmacy) was the first court pharmacy in Hanover and was owned by members of the Andreae family from 1645 to 1803. It was founded in 1639 on Klappenburg by Dr. Joachim Jäger with a ducal privilege from Christian Louis, Duke of Brunswick-Lüneburg. The pharmacy quickly came to serve the ducal court and became the official court pharmacy. As Jäger became canonicus at Braunschweig, he sold the pharmacy to Johann Andreae in 1645 with permission from the Duke.

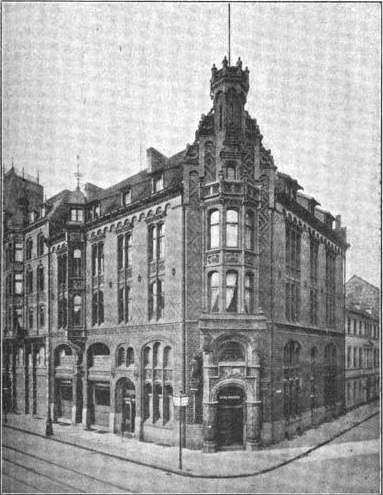
The then-Hirsch Pharmacy in 1891

In 1657, the pharmacy was taken over by Ernst Andreas Hornbostel, who was married to Andreae's widow. Eleven years later, it was moved to a square near the ducal palace and Hornbostel was officially appointed court pharmacist.

In 1679, Hornbostel died and his stepson, Ernst Leopold Andreae (born ca. 1640), succeeded him as court pharmacist. He is mentioned in 1673 as the "court pharmacist of the Dowager Princess", i.e. Elisabeth Sophie of Brunswick-Lüneburg.

In 1668, the Prince-Bishop of Osnabrück, the later Ernest Augustus, Elector of Brunswick-Lüneburg, had appointed Christian Jäger as his court pharmacist in Iburg and Osnabrück. When Ernest Augustus relocated to Hanover in 1680, Jäger moved his pharmacy as well and demanded the status of court pharmacist and that the Andreae Pharmacy be closed because he claimed to be the "true court pharmacist." This led to over 20 years of legal wrangling between Jäger and Johann Andreae's children, which ended with a settlement.

In 1732, the widow and children of the deceased court pharmacist Heinrich Leopold Andreae received a confirmation of their ducal privilege from George II. In 1747, his son Johann Gerhard Reinhard Andreae, the famous natural scientist, became owner of the pharmacy. He was also a noted philanthropist in Hanover. The botanist Jakob Friedrich Ehrhart worked as an apprentice in the firm under J.G.R. Andreae's ownership, and later named the genus Andreaea (the type genus of the family Andreaeaceae) for Andreae. The Andreae family were one of the most highly regarded families in Hanover, and J.G.R. Andreae in particular was one of the city's major benefactors.

Johann Gerhard Reinhard Andreae had no children of his own, but he had one sister, Sophie Elisabeth Andreae (1730–1764), who was married to the banker turned theatre director Abel Seyler. Following her death, her husband Abel Seyler gave up his paternal rights to their three children to his brother-in-law Andreae, who raised them as his own. They were Abel Jacob Gerhard Seyler (1756–1805), who became a court pharmacist and a member of the Illuminati, Ludwig Erdwin Seyler (1758–1836), who became a prominent banker and co-owner of Berenberg Bank, and Sophie Seyler (1762–1833), who married the poet Johann Anton Leisewitz. After Andreae's death in 1793, the Seyler siblings inherited the pharmacy, and employed Philipp Friedrich David Murray (1770–1828) as its administrator. In 1803, Abel Jacob Gerhard Seyler sold the pharmacy to Johann Ludewig Wilhelm Gruner, with a ducal privilege from George III.

The pharmacy retained the name Andreae & Co. and remained widely known as the Andreae Pharmacy, even after the Andreae family's ownership ended in 1803. In the later half of the 19th century, the pharmacy was also known unofficially as the Hirsch Pharmacy (Hirsch-Apotheke). It was located in Calenbergerstrasse 28.

== Owners ==
- 1639–1645 Dr. Joachim Jäger
- 1645–1657 Johann Andreae and subsequently his widow (no relation to the former owner)
- 1657–1679 Ernst Andreas Hornbostel (married to the latter's widow)
- 1679– Ernst Leopold Andreae (son of Johann Andreae)
- –1730 Heinrich Leopold Andreae (son of Ernst Leopold Andreae)
- 1730–1751 Katharina Elisabeth Andreae née Rosenhagen (widow of Heinrich Leopold Andreae)
- 1751–1793 Johann Gerhard Reinhard Andreae (son of Heinrich Leopold Andreae and Katharina Elisabeth Andreae)
- 1793–1803 Abel Jacob Gerhard Seyler (nephew of Johann Gerhard Reinhard Andreae and grandson of Heinrich Leopold Andreae and Katharina Elisabeth Andreae)
- 1803– Johann Ludewig Wilhelm Gruner (no relation to the former owners)

== Literature ==
- "Historie der Andreaeen Apothec in hiesiger Neustadt", Hannoversche Geschichtsblätter, 1901, p. 397–399
