= Ehrengard Schramm =

German politician and writer

Ehrengard "Eta" Schramm von Thadden (1900–1985) was a German politician and writer.

Von Thadden was born into a noble family on 5 October 1900, in Greifenberg, Pomerania

Her brother was far-right-wing politician Adolf von Thadden, and her sister, Elisabeth, was a resistance fighter. After Elisabeth's death, Schramm began activist work in 1945. During this time, she travelled to Greece, where she learned how people in Kalavryta had been impacted by Nazis during the Kalavryta massacre of World War II. After this, she provided assistance through the Deutscher Frauenring, a German feminist organization. Through her efforts, many people from the region completed studies in Germany.

In 1957, she joined the Social Democratic Party of Germany (SPD). Two years later, she became Göttingen's SPD representative in the Lower Saxony State Parliament, a position she held for two terms.

Von Thadden married historian Percy Ernst Schramm, with whom she had three sons. She died on 30 June 1985, and was buried in Hamburg.
