= Berent Schwineköper =

German archivist and historian

Berent Schwineköper (8 November 1912 – 8 March 1993) was a German archivist and historian.

Born in Magdeburg, Prussian Saxony, Schwineköper was the son of an apothecary. At the universities of Göttingen, Vienna, and Freiburg, Schwineköper studied history, German studies, art history, and historical auxiliary sciences. His main advisors were Alfons Dopsch, Heinrich von Srbik, Hermann Heimpel, and especially Percy Ernst Schramm, from whom Schwineköper received his doctorate in 1937 with the work Der Handschuh im Recht, Ämterwesen, Brauchtum und Volksglauben.

Schwineköper attended the Institut für Archivwissenschaft (institute for archival science) from 1939–41 and then was the archivist at the Prussian Privy State Archives in Berlin-Dahlem. In 1944 he became archival councillor at the state archive in Magdeburg. From February 1946 to June 1959, Schwineköper was scientific archivist at the provincial archive in Magdeburg. In 1958 he was named an honorary docent for diplomatics of the Middle Ages and for regional history at the Institut für Archivwissenschaft in Potsdam.

In June 1959 Schwineköper migrated from East Germany to West Germany to work at the city archive of Freiburg. He began teaching at the University of Freiburg in 1964 and was named an honorary professor in 1972. He was a participant of the Konstanzer Arbeitskreis concerning medieval history and an extraordinary member of the historical commission of the Bavarian Academy of Sciences. He was also a member of the East German historical commission for Saxony-Anhalt. Schwineköper died in Freiburg.
