= Johann Gerhard Reinhard Andreae =

German geologist (1724–1793)

Johann Gehard Reinhard Andreas
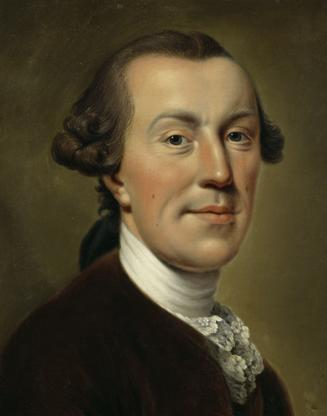
- Johann Gerhard Reinhard Andreae, portrait by Johann Georg Ziesenis ca. 1770
- Born: 17 December 1724; Hanover
- Died: 1 May 1793 (aged 68); Hanover
- Occupation: German natural scientist

Johann Gerhard Reinhard Andreae (ca. 17 December 1724 – 1 May 1793), often known as J.G.R. Andreae or I.G.R. Andreae, was a Hanoverian natural scientist, chemist, geologist, court pharmacist (Hofapotheker) and alchemist in the Age of Enlightenment. Internationally noted as a polymath, he was known throughout Europe particularly for his extensive natural history collections and for his pioneering and influential scientific work on soil and their uses for modern agriculture. He was a correspondent and collaborator of many of the great scientists of the day, such as Benjamin Franklin, Pieter van Musschenbroek and George Shaw. The genus Andreaea, the type genus of the family Andreaeaceae of mosses, was named in his honour by his friend, the botanist Jakob Friedrich Ehrhart. Andreae was also noted as one of the major benefactors in Hanover in his lifetime.

== Life and career ==
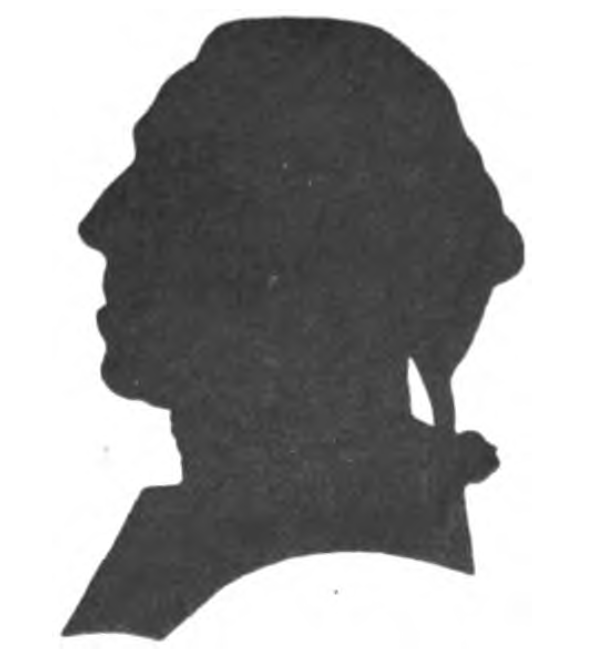
A silhouette of J.G.R. Andreae

He was born in Hanover, the son and one of two children of the wealthy court pharmacist Leopold Andreae (1686–1730), owner of the Andreae Pharmacy (Andreae & Co.), and Katharina Elisabeth Rosenhagen (died 1752). His grandfather was the pharmacist Ernst Leopold Andreae (born ca. 1640). The Andreae pharmacy had been founded in 1639 with a ducal privilege from Christian Louis, Duke of Brunswick-Lüneburg and taken over by his great-grandfather Johann Andreae in 1645. It quickly came to serve the ducal court and became the official court pharmacy.

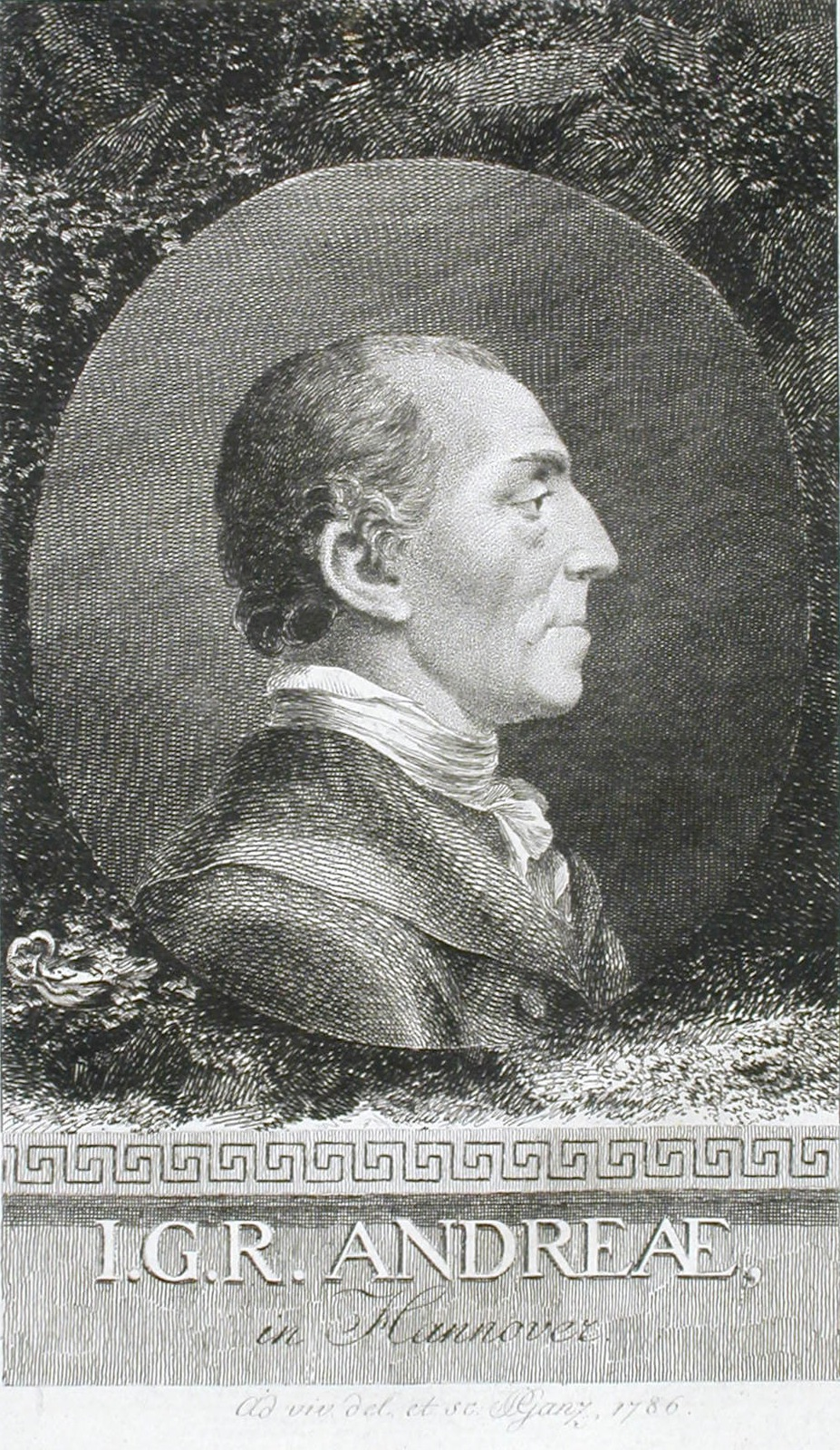
Engraving of J.G.R. Andreae

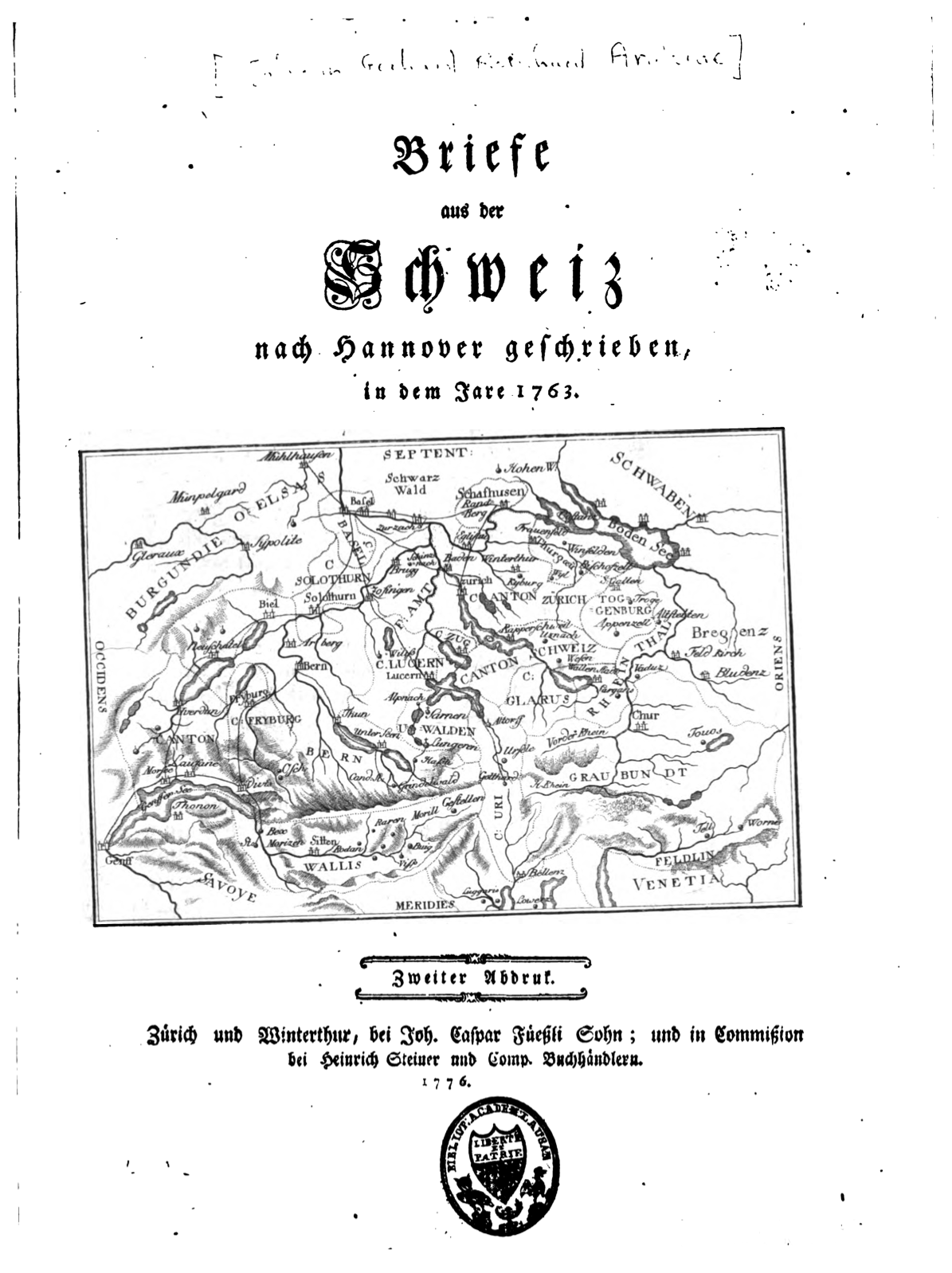
The book Briefe aus der Schweiz nach Hannover geschrieben

His father died early and he was raised by his mother, "a very active, intelligent and righteous woman," who arranged for him to receive an extraordinarily good education for his era. He studied all the sciences and learned all the important languages of 18th century Europe. Andreae learned the art of pharmacy in his family pharmacy, which at that time was managed by the court pharmacist Ruge from Celle. Urged by the court physician P.G. Werlhof (1699–1767) to study natural sciences, he studied geology and chemistry under Johann Heinrich Pott in Berlin, chemistry, mineralogy and metallurgy under Johann Andreas Cramer in Blankenburg, and chemistry under Hieronymus David Gaubius in Leyden. In 1747 he became head of his family's pharmacy in Hanover, at the time still owned by his mother. His mother formally ceded the ownership to him in 1751, shortly before her death. In November 1751, he married Ilse Sophie Müller (1728–1795). The marriage was a happy one, but they had no children of their own.

In 1763, he undertook a scientific expedition across Switzerland, to study herbaria, fossil and crystal collections, salt evaporation ponds, hot springs and glaciers. His letters from Switzerland were published 1764–65 in the Hannoversche Magazin, and were published as an elaborate book in Zurich in 1776. He was highly regarded by the Hanover government and often asked for advice. On behalf of the Prince Elector of Hanover, he studied a great number of types of soil and their uses for agriculture. In 1767, he published his Alchemistische Briefe, with many pharmaceutical insights. Between 1778 and 1781, he employed Jakob Friedrich Ehrhart (a pupil of Carl Linnaeus) to organise his natural history collections, including an herbarium and a collection of seeds. He also wrote poetry and was a music lover.

He was a friend of many famous contemporaries he had met on his travels—among them Pieter van Musschenbroek, Jean-André Deluc, Benjamin Franklin, George Shaw and Philipp Friedrich Gmelin—and corresponded regularly with them. His natural history collections were known throughout Europe. He was also a great admirer of Gottfried Wilhelm Leibniz.

His only sister Sophie Elisabeth Andreae (1730–1764) was married to the banker turned theatre director Abel Seyler, who became "the leading patron of German theatre" in his lifetime. Andreae viewed his brother-in-law with some scepticism. As his sister died in 1764 and her husband devoted himself completely to the theatre, their three children—Abel Seyler the Younger, Ludwig Erdwin Seyler and Sophie Seyler, later married to the poet Johann Anton Leisewitz—were raised by J.G.R. Andreae and his wife from 1764, and they were described as loving parents for his sister's children. When the Seyler theatrical company was on the verge of bankruptcy around 1770, Andreae also paid off its substantial debts to save the company, after the famous actor Konrad Ekhof had pleaded for help, but demanded that his brother-in-law should have no say in economic affairs from that point.

Andreae was related, although not closely, to his niece's husband Johann Anton Leisewitz.

"In his youth Leisewitz had been a frequent visitor in the Andreae home with its large library and he was later to purport that he had long held Andreae, whom he regarded as an uncle, in the highest esteem."

Andreae declined memberships of several scientific societies, as he regarded such honours as "learned charlatanry."

The Andreae family were one of the most highly regarded families in Hanover. Described as kind and generous to everyone, J.G.R. Andreae in particular was one of the city's major benefactors in his lifetime.

== Works ==
- Briefe aus der Schweiz nach Hannover geschrieben, in dem Jahre 1763 (Online)
- Alchemistische Briefe, 1767
- Abhandlung über eine beträchtliche Anzahl Erdorten, aus Sr. Majestät deutschen Landen etc. Und von derselben Gebrauch, für den Landwirth, 1769

== Literature ==
- Joachim Knoll, Die Schweizreise des hannoverschen Apothekers Johann Gerhard Reinhard Andreae im Jahr 1763. Niemeyer, 2006.
- Verzeichniss der Büchersammlung des Apothekers J.G.R. Andreae, 1794
