= Percy Ernst Schramm =

German historian

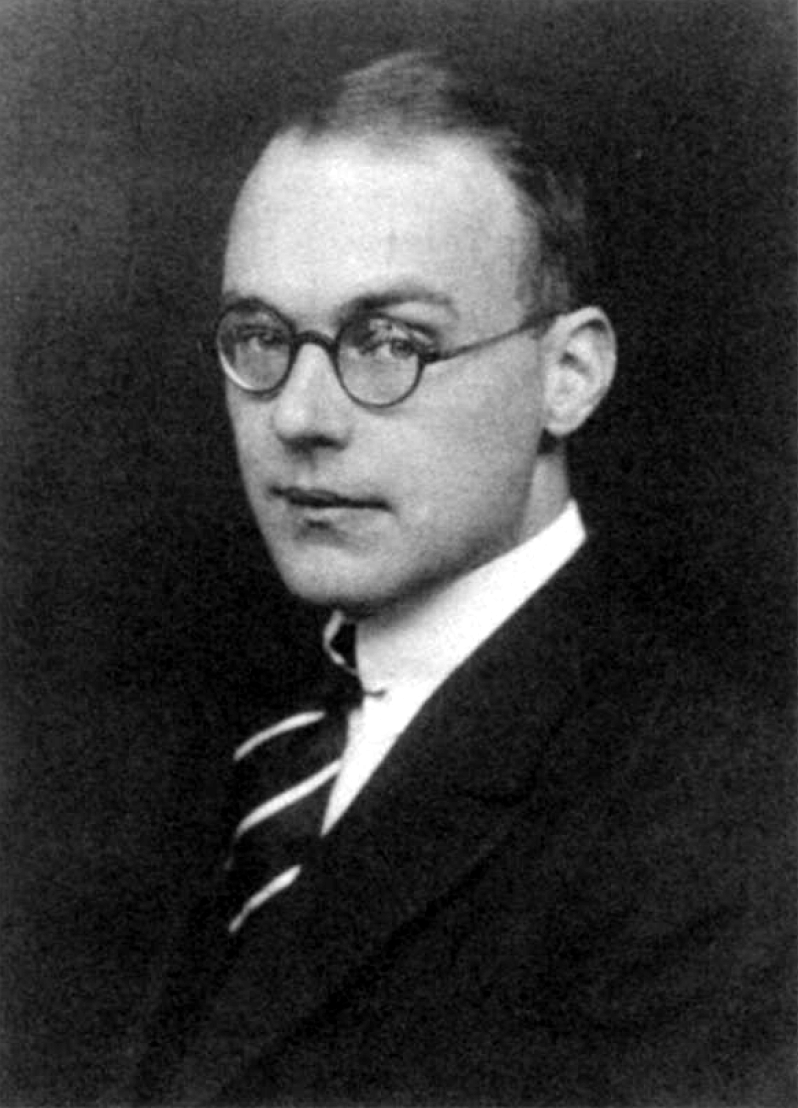
- Schramm in 1925
- Born: 14 October 1894; Hamburg, Germany
- Died: 12 November 1970 (aged 76); Göttingen, Germany
- Spouse: Ehrengard Schramm
- Awards: Pour le Mérite (1958)

Academic background
- Education: Heidelberg University (PhD, habil.)
- Academic advisor: Karl Hampe

Academic work
- Discipline: History
- Sub-discipline: Art history; Medieval history
- Institutions: University of Göttingen
- Notable students: Berent Schwineköper
- Notable works: Kaiser, Rom und Renovatio (1930); Herrschaftszeichen und Staatssymbolik (1954–1978)
- Influenced: Reinhard Wenskus

Percy Ernst Schramm (14 October 1894 – 12 November 1970) was a German historian who specialized in art history and medieval history. Schramm was a Chair and Professor of History at the University of Göttingen from 1929 to 1963.

== Early life and education ==
Schramm was born to a wealthy and cosmopolitan family in Hamburg, that belonged to the class of Hanseatic families. His father, Max Schramm, was a lawyer, senator and second mayor (i.e. deputy mayor) from 1925 to 1928. His grandfather Ernst Schramm (1812–1882) had been a major sugar merchant in Hamburg and Brazil. His mother Olga O'Swald, grandniece of William Henry O'Swald, also belonged to a prominent Hanseatic family.

The young Percy served in the German Army during World War I and went on to study history and art history at several of Germany's elite universities, including the University of Hamburg, the Ludwig-Maximilians-Universität München, and Heidelberg University. In 1922, he completed his doctoral studies at Heidelberg University under the medieval historian Karl Hampe. He remained at Heidelberg University for two more years to write his Habilitationsschrift on the topic of German imperial ideology in the tenth and eleventh centuries, and in particular, how the Holy Roman emperors of the medieval period appropriated the imagery and history of the ancient Roman Empire for their own rule. Published in 1929 as Kaiser, Rom und Renovatio: Studien und Texte zur Geschichte des römischen Erneuerungsgedankens vom Ende des karolingischen Reiches bis zum Investiturstreit ("Emperor, Rome and Renovatio: Studies and Texts on the History of Roman Ideologies of Renewal from the End of the Carolingian Empire to the Investiture Controversy"), Schramm's thesis was a landmark piece of highly original, interdisciplinary scholarship that transformed the way medieval historians approached the subject of political ideology. He demonstrated that art history, a field of study which at the time fell mostly to dilettantes and gentleman scholars, deserved a place in serious academic inquiry alongside history and philology. Schramm's work also emphasized the centrality of symbols and ritual in articulating and defining political ideologies.

In a rite of passage required of most German medievalists at the time, Schramm worked for two years at the Monumenta Germaniae Historica before being offered a professorship. In 1929, he was awarded a chair in history at the University of Göttingen, one of Germany's most prestigious universities. His students at the University of Göttingen included Berent Schwineköper; the American professor of German History, Donald Detwiler; and the Hungarian medievalist, János Bak. Schramm remained there until his retirement in 1963.

In Spring 1932, Schramm spoke publicly in Thalburg on behalf of the re-election of Paul von Hindenburg, who was running against Adolf Hitler for the Presidency of the Weimar Republic. Speaking fluent English, Schramm received an invitation to teach at Princeton University during the 1933 academic year; he returned to the University of Göttingen in that same year, after Hindenburg had appointed Hitler to be Chancellor of Germany.

== Second World War ==
During World War II, Schramm volunteered again for service in the Wehrmacht and, given the rank of major, served in various staff positions until he was selected as the official staff historian, or diarist, for the German High Command Operational Staff (Wehrmachtführungsstab), replacing Helmuth Greiner, whose removal was orchestrated by Martin Bormann, the head of the Nazi Party chancellery. Schramm's duties involved keeping detailed records about the day-to-day activities and decisions of the General Staff, which included the top military field commanders in the German Army. This allowed Schramm unprecedented access to the highest echelons of the German military and its inner workings.

In 1944, Schramm's sister-in-law was executed because of her active opposition to the Nazi regime, and accusations against Schramm himself, doubting his reliability, became known to Hitler's headquarters. However, these were ignored by General Alfred Jodl, Schramm's superior, and the historian was able to continue in his role as war diarist.

Because of his knowledge of the High Command, Schramm was called as a key witness at the Nuremberg Trials after the war, where he testified on behalf of Jodl. Schramm maintained that Jodl, while a loyal soldier, was not an ideological Nazi and did not participate in any war crimes. Nonetheless, Jodl was convicted and hanged in 1946. (Note: Jodl was posthumously acquitted in 1953 by a German denazification court.)

In the years after the war, Schramm authored a number of books on the history of the German military, as well as in-depth accounts of the desperate last days of the Third Reich as seen from inside the military command. Schramm's work in this field, particularly his multi-volume edition of the official diaries of the High Command, is still highly valued by military historians. Schramm was able, along with three of his former students, then professors themselves, (Note: Schramm's three ex-students were Professors Hans-Adolf Jacobsen, Andreas Hillgruber, and Walther Hubatsch. Detwiler, Donald S. (1978) "Introduction" to Schramm, Percy Ernst Hitler: The Man and the Military Leader. Malabar, Florida: Robert E. Kreiger Publishing Company. p.6 ISBN 0-89874-962-X) to re-assemble the diary from copies he had saved in defiance of Hitler's scorched earth orders, combined with copies of diaries of earlier years which had been saved by Greiner, his predecessor as war diarist.

In 1962, Schramm published to some controversy a study of Adolf Hitler as a military commander (Hitler als militärischer Führer). Schramm was able to observe Hitler during the course of his duties, and he contrasted the patriotism and professionalism of the generals he served under with Hitler's irrationality and growing paranoia as the war took a turn for the worse.

Schramm also published, in 1963, an introduction to Henry Picker's Hitlers Tischgespräche (Hitler's Table Talk) entitled "The Anatomy of a Dictator", which was later published in English together with the earlier essay on Hitler's as a military leader as Hitler: The Man and the Military Leader.

Whatever the merits of his other work, the essay on Hitler's personality provoked some criticism in the German press at the time, where Schramm was accused of being an apologist for National Socialism. In a series of lectures one year later at the Ludwig-Maximilians-Universität München, during the summer term of 1964, the political philosopher and philosopher of history Eric Voegelin dismissed these charges; the lectures were later translated and published under the title of Hitler and the Germans. Voegelin argued at length, based on a close reading of Schramm's text and comparing it unfavourably with Alan Bullock's analysis, that Schramm gave no insight into 'the problem of Hitler', and that this was in any case an 'alibi' for the real problem. The real problem, Voegelin stated, drawing on classical thinkers from Plato to Schelling, as well as from contemporary German writers such as Carl Amery Capitulation: The Lesson of German Catholicism and Robert Musil On Stupidity) was the way that German Anstand bourgeois morality had rendered many, but not all, of the German population spiritually blind and effectively stupid, a state of affairs that had been allowed to persist until the present day. Schramm himself, Voegelin argued quite carefully, was, in a similar sense, stupid.

== Post-war career ==
Because he had been a member of the Nazi Party and served in a relatively high position in the army during the war, Schramm was removed from his university post. As denazification waned in the late 1940s, however, he was rehabilitated and returned to his professorship in Göttingen. Between 1954 and 1956, he produced what was perhaps his second most significant work, after Kaiser Rom und Renovatio, titled Herrschaftszeichen und Staatssymbolik (Signs of Authority and the Symbolism of the State). Herrschaftszeichen was a major survey of the representative art of medieval rulers or symbols of their power, including their regalia, seals, coinage, armaments, clothing, and other objects. These objects and their history were catalogued in more detail in a book Schramm authored together with the eminent art historian Florentine Mütherich, Denkmale der deutschen Könige und Kaiser ("Monuments of the German Kings and Emperors", 1962).

The enduring legacy of Schramm's work in these and numerous other studies and articles, was to demonstrate the importance of symbols, liturgical ceremony, gestures and images as critical sources for political history. Along with his contemporaries, Ernst H. Kantorowicz and Carl Erdmann, Schramm introduced an important element of cultural history to a field which (especially in Germany) tended to focus largely on institutions and their texts.

In 1958, Schramm was inducted into the Order Pour le Mérite, an award recognizing his contributions to the arts and sciences in Germany. In 1964, a Festschrift devoted to Schramm was published.

== Personal life ==
Schramm married Ehrengard Schramm. He died in 1970 in Göttingen.

== Selected works ==
- 1928. Die zeitgenössischen Bildnisse Karls des Grossen. Leipzig.
- 1928. Die deutschen Kaiser und Könige in Bildern ihrer Zeit, 751–1190. Berlin.
- 1930. Kaiser, Rom und Renovatio. Leipzig.
- 1937. Geschichte des englischen Königtums im Lichte der Krönung. Weimar. Translated into English as:
- 1937. A History of the English Coronation, tr. Leopold G. Wickham Legg. Oxford.
- 1939. Der König von Frankreich: das Wesen der Monarchie vom 9. zum 16. Jahrhundert. Darmstadt.
- 1949. Kaufleute zu Haus und über See. Hamburgische Zeugnisse des 17., 18. und 19. Jahrhunderts. Hamburg, Hoffmann und Campe.
- 1954–1978. With others. Herrschaftszeichen und Staatssymbolik: Beiträge zu ihrer Geschichte vom dritten bis zum sechzehnten Jahrhundert. Stuttgart.
- 1962. Hitler als militärischer Führer. Erkenntnisse und Erfahrungen aus dem Kriegstagebuch des Oberkommandos der Wehrmacht. Frankfurt am Main / Bonn.
- 1962–1978. With Florentine Mütherich. Denkmale der deutschen Könige und Kaiser: ein Beitrag zur Herrschergeschichte. Munich.
- 1963/4. Neun Generationen: Dreihundert Jahre deutscher "Kulturgeschichte" im Lichte der Schicksale einer Hamburger Bürgerfamilie (1648–1948). Göttingen. Two volumes, 1148 pages.
- 1968–71. Kaiser, Könige und Päpste: Gesammelte Aufsätze zur Geschichte des Mittelalters. 4 vols. in 5. Stuttgart.

== Decorations and awards ==
- 1958: Pour le Mérite for Arts and Sciences, Chancellor of the Order from 1963 until his death
- Austrian Decoration of Honour for Science and Art
- 1964: Lappenberg Medal from the Association of Hamburg History – for his services to the Hamburg-Research
- 1965: Corresponding member of the Bavarian Academy of Sciences
