= Felix Hoppe-Seyler =

German physiologist and chemist (1825–1895)

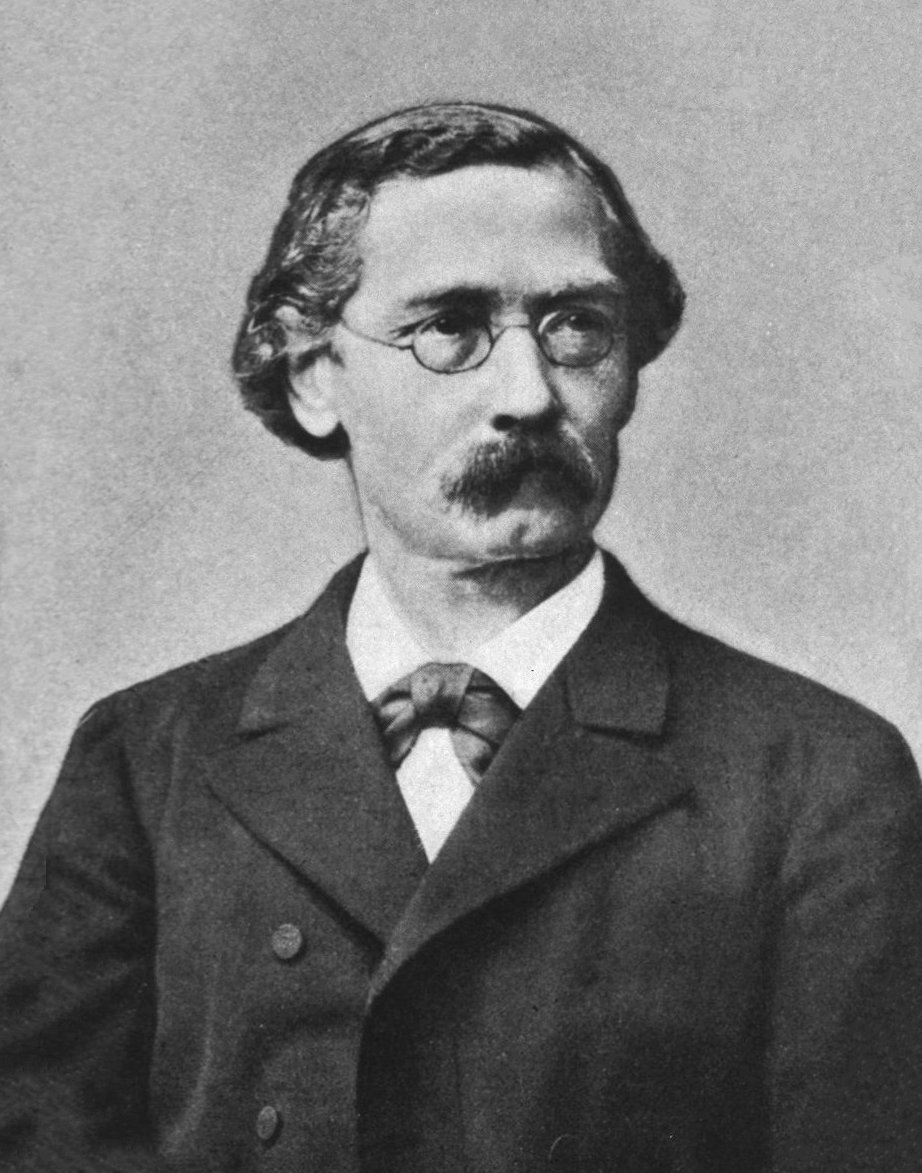
- Felix Hoppe-Seyler
- Born: Ernst Felix Immanuel Hoppe; 26 December 1825; Freyburg (Unstrut), Kreis Weißenfels, Province of Saxony, Kingdom of Prussia, German Confederation
- Died: 10 August 1895 (aged 69); Wasserburg am Bodensee, Bezirksamt Lindau, Kingdom of Bavaria, German Empire
- Education: Friedrich University of Halle; Leipzig University; Friedrich Wilhelm University; Charles Ferdinand University; University of Vienna
- Scientific career
- Fields: physiology chemistry
- Workplaces: Martin Luther University of Halle-Wittenberg; Leipzig University

Ernst Felix Immanuel Hoppe-Seyler (né Felix Hoppe; 26 December 1825 – 10 August 1895) was a German physiologist and chemist, and the principal founder of the disciplines of biochemistry and molecular biology. He had discovered Yeast nucleic acid which is now called RNA in his attempts to follow up and confirm Miescher's results by repeating parts of Miescher's experiments. He took the name Hoppe-Seyler when he was adopted by his brother-in-law, a grandson of the famous theatre principal Abel Seyler.

== Biography ==
Hoppe-Seyler was born in Freyburg an der Unstrut in the Province of Saxony. He originally trained to be a physician in Halle and Leipzig, and received his medical doctorate from Berlin in 1851. Afterwards, he was an assistant to Rudolf Virchow at the Pathological Institute in Berlin. Hoppe-Seyler preferred scientific research to medicine, and later held positions in anatomy, applied chemistry, and physiological chemistry in Greifswald, Tübingen and Strasbourg. At Strasbourg, he was head of the department of biochemistry, the only such institution in Germany at the time.

His work also led to advances in organic chemistry by his students and by immunologist Paul Ehrlich. Among his students and collaborators were Friedrich Miescher (1844–1895) and Nobel laureate Albrecht Kossel (1853–1927).

== Background ==
He was the son of the Freiburg superintendent (bishop) Ernst August Dankegott Hoppe. His mother died when he was six years old, and his father three years later. After he became an orphan, he lived for some time in the home of his older sister Klara and her husband, the Annaburg pastor Georg Seyler, a grandson of the famous theatre director Abel Seyler. He eventually entered the orphan asylum at Halle, where he attended the gymnasium. In 1864, he was formally adopted by Georg Seyler and added the Seyler name to his birth name.

In 1858, he married Agnes Franziska Maria Borstein, and they had one son, Georg Hoppe-Seyler, who became a professor of medicine in Kiel.

== Contributions ==
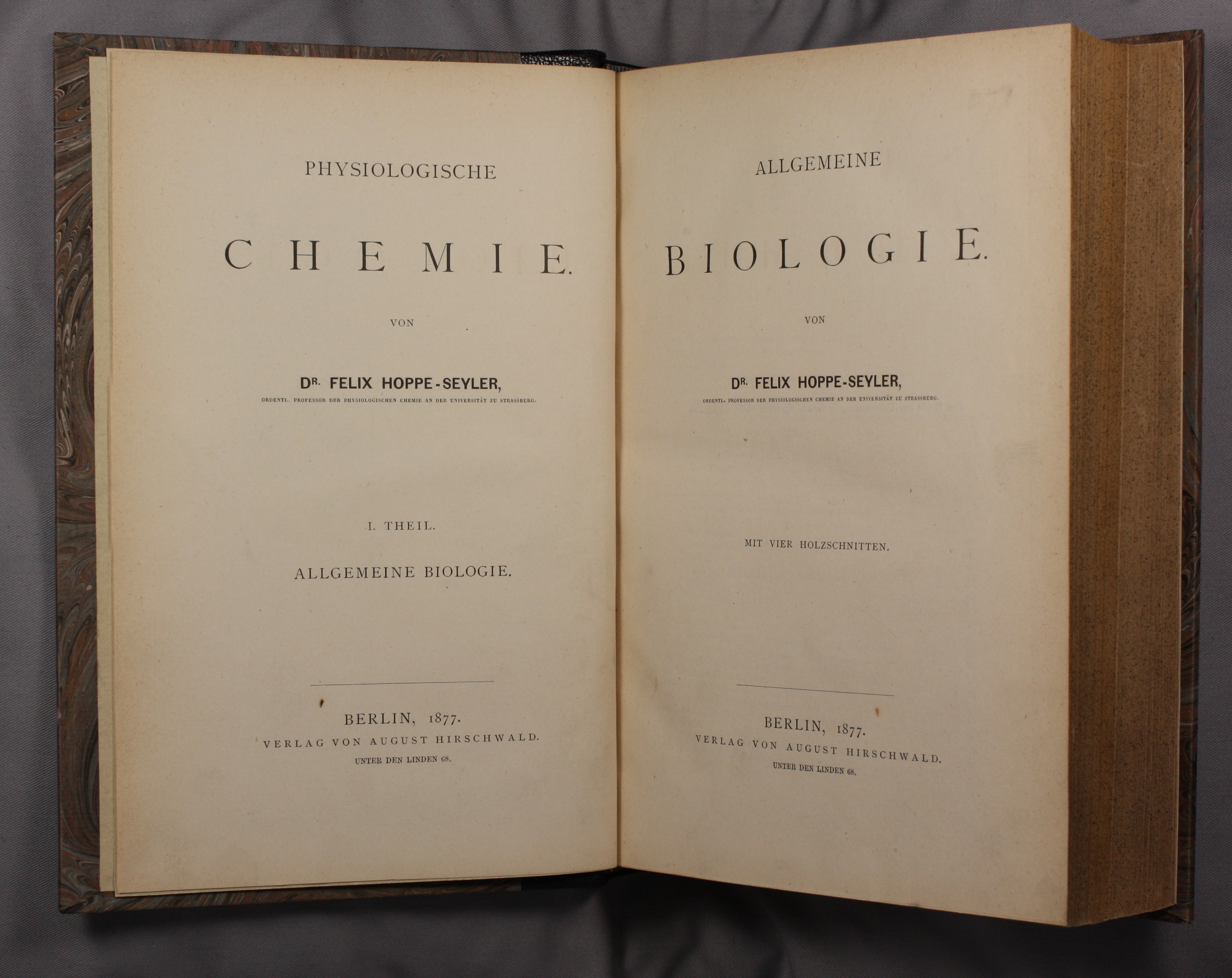
Physiologische Chemie, 1877

Felix Hoppe-Seyler, a physiologist and chemist, became the principal founder of biochemistry. His text Physiological Chemistry became the standard text for this new branch of applied chemistry.

His numerous investigations include studies of blood, hemoglobin, pus, bile, milk, and urine. Hoppe-Seyler was the first scientist to describe the optical absorption spectrum of the red blood pigment and its two distinctive absorption bands. He also recognized the binding of oxygen to erythrocytes as a function of hemoglobin, which in turn creates the compound oxyhemoglobin. Hoppe-Seyler was able to obtain hemoglobin in crystalline form, and confirmed that it contained iron.

He became an elected member of the French Academy of Sciences, despite the unfavorable political terms between France and Germany at that time, and this helped him gain an international reputation as the keen promoter of science.

Hoppe-Seyler performed important studies of chlorophyll. He is also credited with the isolation of several different proteins (which he referred to as "proteids"). In addition, he was the first scientist to purify lecithin and establish its composition. In 1877, he founded the Zeitschrift für Physiologische Chemie (Journal for Physiological Chemistry), and was its editor until his death in 1895. He died in Wasserburg am Bodensee in the Kingdom of Bavaria.

== Works ==
- Anleitung zur pathologisch-chemischen Analyse fur Aerzte und Studirende (in German). Berlin: Hirschwald. 1858.
- Allgemeine Biologie (in German). Berlin: Hirschwald. 1877.
- Specielle physiologische Chemie (in German). Berlin: Hirschwald. 1878.
- Specielle physiologische Chemie (in German). Berlin: Hirschwald. 1879.
- Specielle physiologische Chemie (in German). Berlin: Hirschwald. 1881.

=== Selected written works ===
- Handbuch der physiologisch und pathologisch-chemischen Analyse (1858). Digital 8th edition from 1909 by the University and State Library Düsseldorf
- Physiologische Chemie (4 volumes, 1877–81).
- Zeitschrift für Physiologische Chemie (1877–1921).
