= Julius of Taranto =

Julius of Taranto, also known as Julius of Tarent (German: Julius von Tarent), is a dramatic tragedy by Johann Anton Leisewitz, published in 1774. The play, with its theme of the conflict between two brothers and the woman loved by both, is one of the most characteristic of the Sturm und Drang era.

The play is strongly inspired by Shakespeare, was a favourite of Friedrich Schiller and much acted in Germany in the 1770s. Its central theme is the struggle between the two princes Julius and Guido of Taranto (Tarent in German) for the affections of commoner Blanca.

Like in Klinger's Die Zwillinge, "a dynamic but frustrated man of action," Guido, "is opposed to a more pacific, melancholy figure," Julius.

The Encyclopædia Britannica describes the play as the forerunner of Friedrich Schiller's famous Sturm und Drang masterpiece The Robbers (1781).

== Roles ==
- Constantin, the Prince of Tarent and father of Julius and Guido
- Julius, Hereditary Prince of the Principality of Tarent
- Guido, his younger brother
- Archbishop of Tarent, the brother of Constantin
- Cäcilia Nigretti, Countess and niece of Constantin
- Blanca, a commoner and Julius' sweetheart
- Count Aspermonte, friend and und confidant of Julius
- Abbess of monastery
- Doctor
- Supporting characters

== Literature ==
- Walther Kühlhorn: J. A. Leisewitzens Julius von Tarent. Erläuterung und literarhistorische Würdigung. Walluf 1973.
- Dramen des Sturm und Drang. Reclam 1997.
- Stefanie Wenzel: Das Motiv der feindlichen Brüder im Drama des Sturm und Drang. Frankfurt 1993.
- Ines Kolb: Herrscheramt und Affektkontrolle. Johann Anton Leisewitz’ „Julius von Tarent“ im Kontext von Staats- u. Moralphilosophie der Aufklärung. Frankfurt 1983
- Johann Anton Leisewitz: Julius von Tarent und die dramatischen Fragmente. Heilbronn 1889
- John W. Van Cleve: Julius of Taranto by J.A. Leisewitz and The Twins by F.M. Klinger: Two Tragedies of the German Sturm und Drang Theater. With Preface. 2020. ISBN 978-1-4955-0982-7.
