= Abel Socin =

Swiss merchant, politician, diplomat (1632–1695)

- Born: 1632; Basel, Switzerland
- Died: 1695 (aged 62–63); Basel, Switzerland
- Occupations: Merchant, politician, law lord (Gerichtsherr) and diplomat
- Spouse: 3

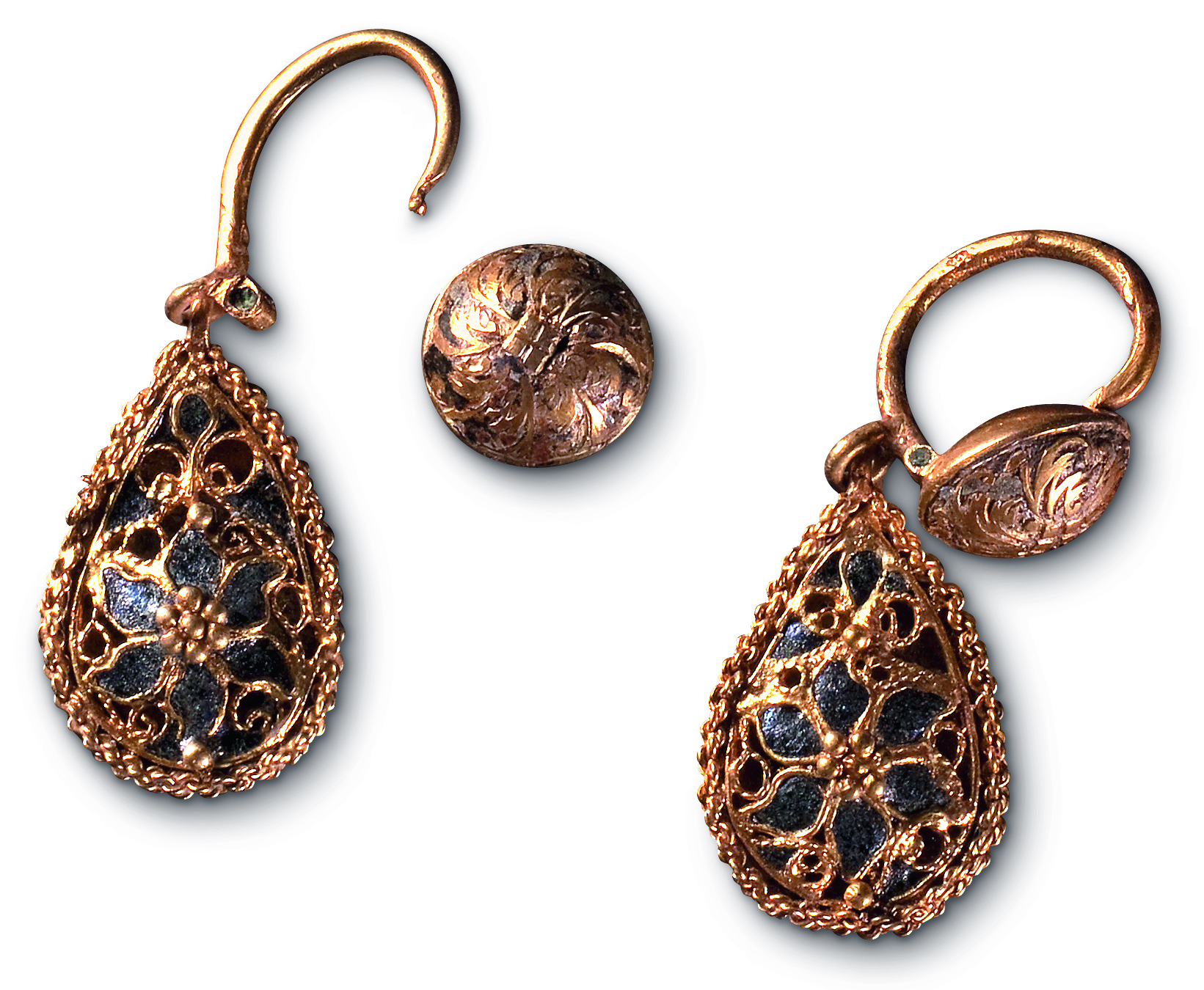
Earrings of Maria Hummel married Socin (1635–1681)

Abel Socin (born 1632 in Basel, died 1695 in Basel) was a Swiss merchant, politician, law lord (Gerichtsherr) and diplomat from Basel. He was a member of the Grand Council of Basel-Stadt and served as the envoy of the Swiss Confederation to the French court (Swiss ambassador to France) from 1679.

In the Basel Minster there is a Latin inscription in memory of Abel Socin; it recounts his life and praises him for his "innate eloquence and thoughtful wisdom."

== Life ==
He was a member of the noble Italian Socin family, one of Basel's leading families. The Socin (Sozini) family had arrived in Basel in the 16th century from the Italian-speaking Swiss city of Bellinzona, which had formerly been part of the Duchy of Milan, and established themselves as wealthy merchants in Italian goods. While resident in Bellinzona in 1551, the family received a confirmation of nobility from the Holy Roman Emperor. Abel Socin was a brother of burgomaster of Basel Emanuel Socin (1628–1717) and the great-grandfather of Abel Seyler, one of the preeminent theatre principals of 18th century Europe, who was named after him. He was married three times; the remains of his second wife Maria Hummel (1635–1681) were discovered in front of the Basel Minster in 2009, in what was Abel Socin's family grave, along with elaborate jewelry described by archaeologists as masterpieces from the era.
