= Sozzini family =

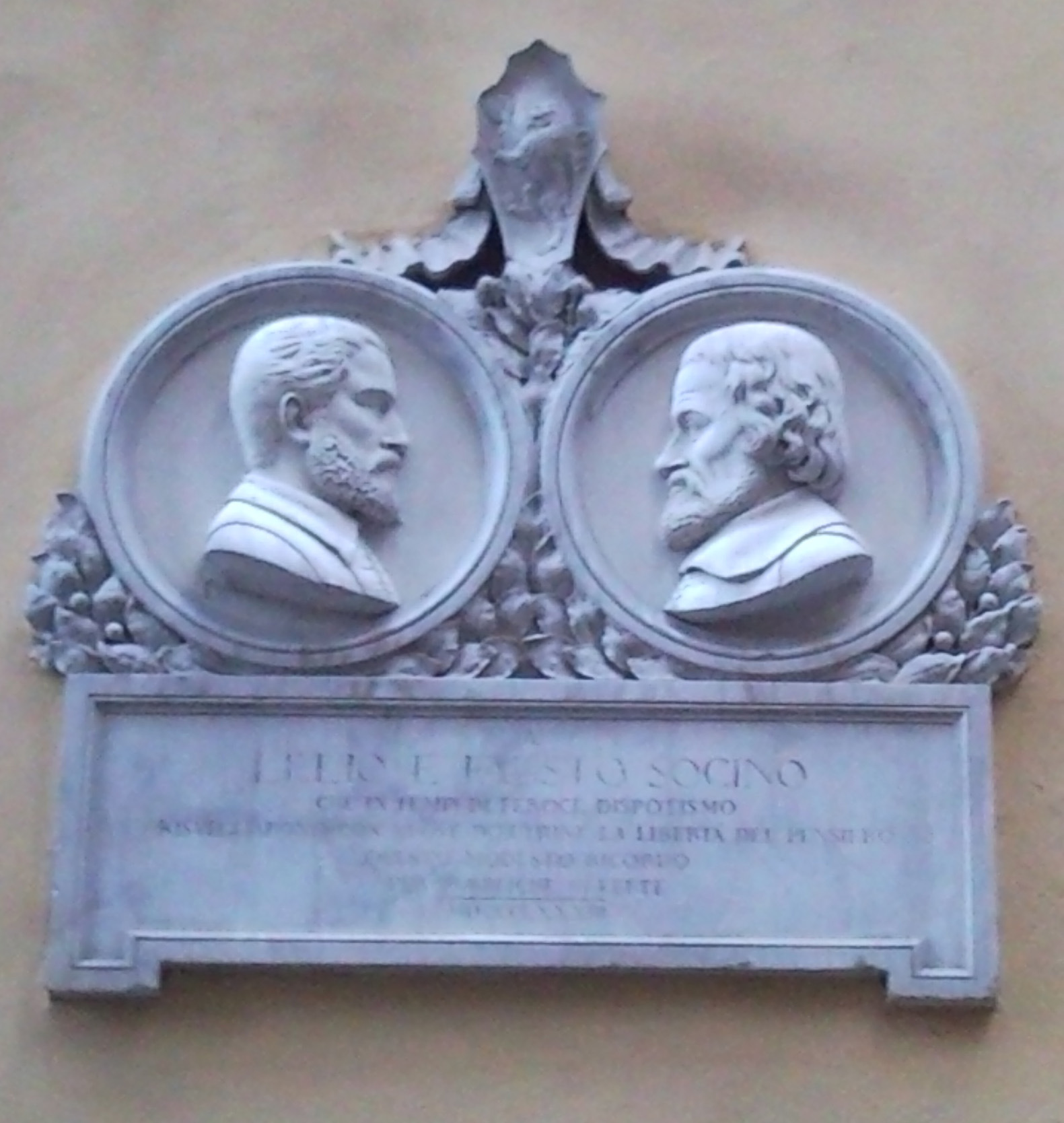
Memorial for Lelio Sozini and Fausto Sozzini in the Sozini Palace in Siena.

Sozzini, Sozini, Socini or Socin is an Italian noble family originally from Siena in Tuscany, where the family were noted as bankers and merchants, jurists and humanist scholars. The family has been described as "the most famous legal dynasty of the Italian Renaissance."

A noble family from Bellinzona that later settled in Basel is believed to be descended from the family from Siena; this family became part of the Basel patriciate from the 16th century.

== Mariano Sozzini ==
The family in Italy includes the jurist Mariano Sozzini, his sons including Celso, Cornelio, Camillo and the theologian Lelio Sozzini and his nephew Fausto Sozzini, for whom Socinianism is named.

== Socin (Sozini) family of Bellinzona and Basel ==
The Socin family of Basel is one of the city's most prominent patrician families, belonging to the so-called Daig. Italian in origin, the family's name was formerly spelled Socini, Sozini or Sozzini. The family is first documented in Bellinzona, then part of the Duchy of Milan, now part of Italian-speaking Switzerland, in 1433. While resident in Bellinzona in 1551, the family received a confirmation of nobility from the Holy Roman Emperor. Pietro Sozini of Bellinzona was doing business in Basel in the 1530s. His two sons Giovanni Antonio Sozini and Benedetto Sozini moved to Basel for religious and economic reasons and established themselves as merchants in Italian goods. They received the burghership of Basel in 1560 and 1565, respectively.

Antonio Socini's descendants formed the so-called older line of the Basel family, which is extinct in the male line, whereas Benedetto's descendants formed the surviving younger Basel line. Benedetto's descendants rose to great prominence as wealthy merchants in Basel. Family members also served as members of the Grand Council, as diplomats, judges and other officials. Among them were Burgomaster and envoy to the French court Emanuel Socin (1628–1717) and envoy to the French court Abel Socin (1632–1695). The latter was a grand-grandfather of Abel Seyler, one of the preeminent theatre principals of 18th century Europe.

The Socin/Socini/Sozini family of Bellinzona and Basel is believed to be descended from the Sozzini family from Siena; it is said the family left Siena in the 15th century during the Guelphs and Ghibellines disputes.

Coat of arms

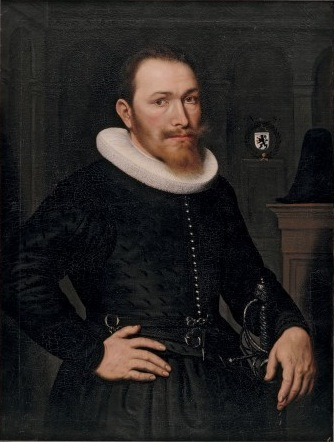
Abel Socin (1581–1638), cloth merchant and judge in Basel

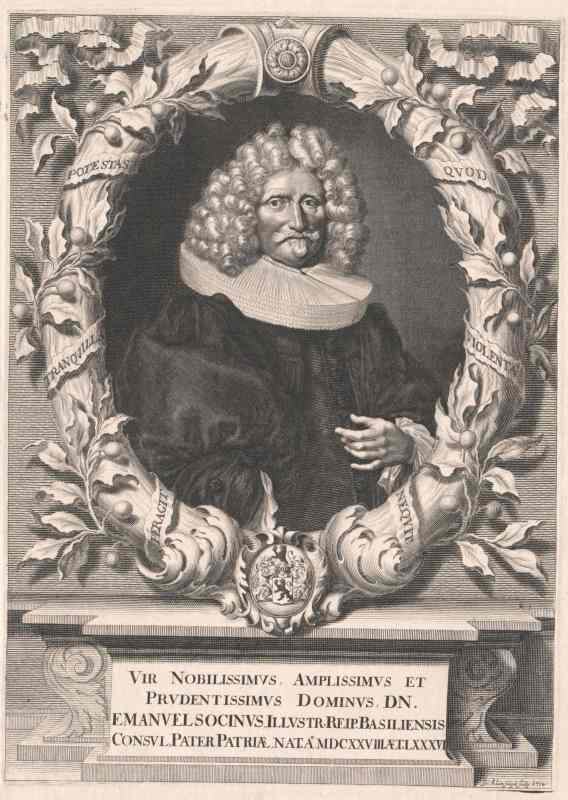
Emanuel Socin (1628–1717), burgomaster of Basel

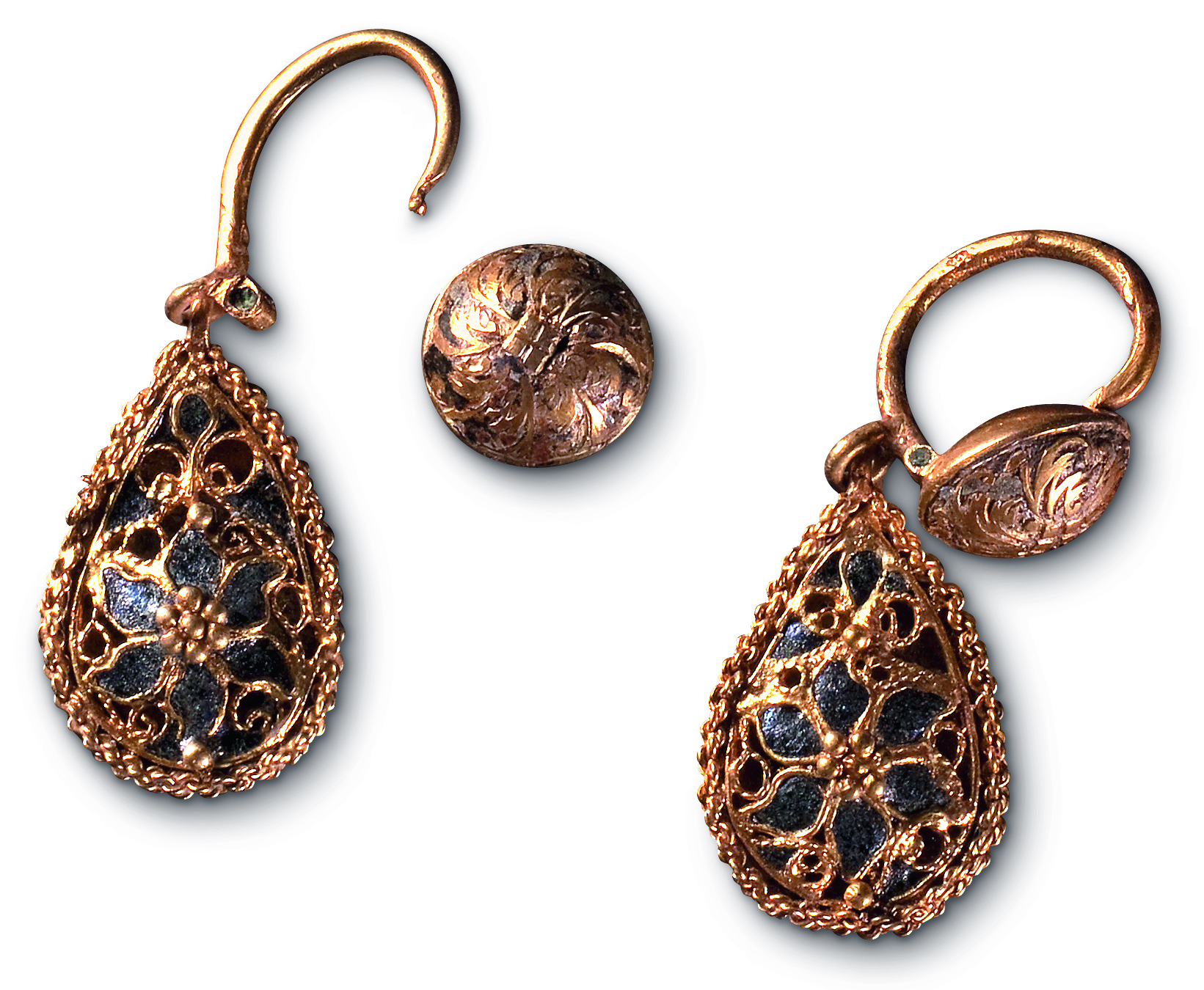
Earrings belonging to Maria Hummel (1635–1681), married to Basel judge, grand councillor and envoy to the French court Abel Socin (1632–1695)

== Coat of arms ==
The coat of arms, a black lion ramping in a white field, with a red ball close to the uplifted claw, is known since the early 14th century when it was used by the notary Ser Mino Sozzi (died 1340).
