= Georg Simon Klügel =

German mathematician and physicist

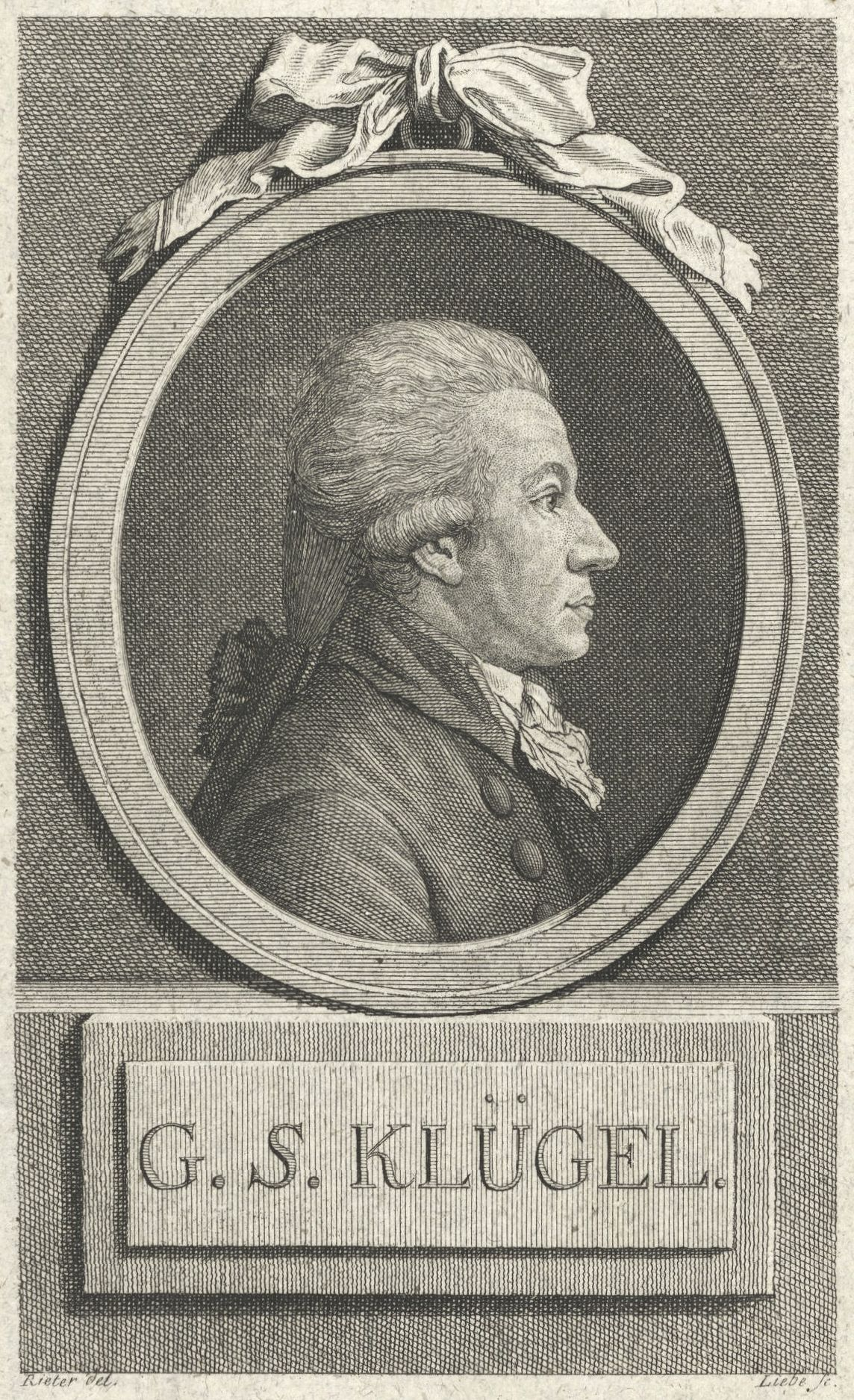
Georg Simon Klügel

Georg Simon Klügel (August 19, 1739 – August 4, 1812) was a German mathematician and physicist.

He was born in Hamburg, and in 1760 went to the University of Göttingen where he initially studied theology before switching to mathematics. Georg Christoph Lichtenberg was a fellow student. His doctoral thesis Conatuum praecipuorum theoriam parallelarum demonstrandi recensio, published in 1763 with Abraham Gotthelf Kästner as doctoral advisor, was a study of 30 attempted proofs of the parallel postulate. It was influential at the time and much cited.

Klügel edited the Hannöversche Magazin for 2 years from 1766, before becoming professor of mathematics at the University of Helmstedt. In 1788 he succeeded Wenzeslaus Johann Gustav Karsten to the chair of mathematics and physics at the University of Halle. He died in Halle in 1812.

He remained in correspondence with Lichtenberg throughout his career.

Klügel made an exceptional contribution to trigonometry, unifying formulae and introducing the concept of trigonometric function, (including coining the term) in his Analytische Trigonometrie 1770.

== Publications ==
- Conatuum praecipuorum theoriam parallelarum demonstrandi recensio, Dissertation, 1760;
- Encyklopädie der gemeinnützigsten Kenntnisse ("Encyclopedia of Common Knowledge") (Berlin 1782-1806, 3 volumes);
- Anfangsgründe der Arithmetik (Berlin 1793, 6th edition 1819);
- Die gemeinnützigsten Vernunftkenntnisse (2nd edition Leipzig 1791).
