= Johann Anton Leisewitz =

German lawyer and dramatic poet

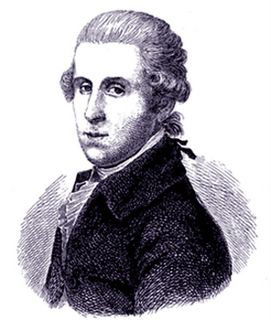
- Born: 9 May 1752 Hanover, Holy Roman Empire
- Died: 7 September 1806 (aged 54) Braunschweig

Johann Anton Leisewitz (9 May 1752 – 10 September 1806) was a German lawyer and dramatic poet, and a central figure of the Sturm und Drang era. He is best known for his only play Julius of Taranto (1774). The play, with its theme of the conflict between two brothers and the woman loved by both, is one of the most characteristic of the Sturm und Drang era. It was a major inspiration on Friedrich Schiller and especially his quintessential Sturm und Drang work The Robbers (1781).

== Biography ==
He went to Göttingen in 1770, and became a member of the circle of poets called Der Hainbund, which included Stolberg and Voss, and contributed two poems to the Göttinger Musenalmanach for 1775, both essentially dramatic and democratic in tone. In 1775, at Brunswick, and later at Berlin and Weimar, he met and soon counted among his friends Eschenburg, Moses Mendelssohn, Lessing, Nicolai, Herder, and Goethe. His single complete play was, Julius of Taranto (1774), was written in his friend Lessing's style and with much of the latter's dramatic technique. The play was a favorite of Friedrich Schiller, and was frequently acted in Germany. It also inspired Friedrich Maximilian Klinger, who was employed as playwright by Leisewitz' father-in-law Abel Seyler.

In 1780, Leisewitz visited Goethe in Weimar, the city where his father-in-law, Abel Seyler, had also worked at the court of Anna Amalia, the "Court of the Muses" as it came to be called. Probably on Goethe's recommendation, Leisewitz became a tutor in 1786 to Prince Ferdinand of Brunswick-Lüneburg. Four years later, Leisewitz became a member of the government in Brunswick. In 1806, Leisewitz died at the age of 54, holding the title of Privy Judicial Councillor in Brunswick. In his will, he had ordered that his literary works be destroyed. He is still remembered for his only play, Julius of Taranto.

== Personal life ==
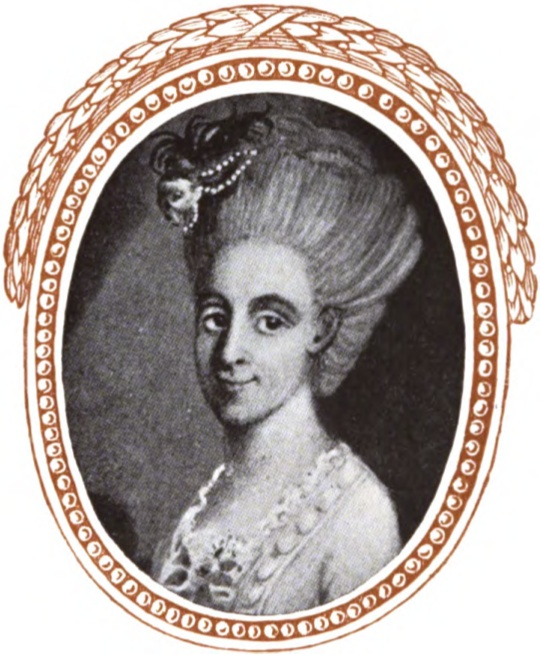
His wife Sophie Seyler

He married Sophie Marie Katharina Seyler (1762–1833) in Hamburg in 1781. She was the daughter of famed Swiss-born theatre director Abel Seyler and stepdaughter of actress Friederike Sophie Seyler, and grew up with her uncle J.G.R. Andreae in Hanover. Her brother was banker Ludwig Erdwin Seyler, who became by marriage a member of the Berenberg-Gossler banking dynasty. Leisewitz was a distant relative of his wife on the Andreae side, and had been a frequent visitor in the Andreae home, with its large library, in his youth. He would later refer to J.G.R. Andreae as his uncle. His diaries and his letters to his wife have been published. The letters sent between Johann Anton Leisewitz and Sophie Seyler have been described as some of the most beautiful love letters of the late 18th century.
