= Ackermann (surname) =

Ackermann is a surname. "Acker" comes from German or Old English, meaning "field", and is related to the word "acre". Ackermann means "farmer" (literally: "fieldman"). Notable people with the surname, also spelled Akkermann. include:

== Academics ==
- Else Ackermann (1933–2019), German physician and pharmacologist
- Jacob Fidelis Ackermann (1765–1815), a German doctor
- Johann Christian Gottlieb Ackermann (1756–1801), a German doctor
- Leopold Ackermann (Petrus Fouresius, 1771–1831), a biblical archaeologist
- Liliane Ackermann (1938–2007), French scientist and author
- Silke Ackermann, German museum curator, and historian of science
- Theodor Ackermann (1825–1896), German pathologist
- Wilhelm Ackermann (1896–1962), German mathematician

== Artists ==
- Christian Ackermann (died 1710), Estonian sculptor
- Franz Ackermann (born 1963), German abstract artist
- Haider Ackermann (born 1971), French fashion designer
- Johann Adam Ackermann (1780–1853), German landscape painter
- Max Ackermann (1887–1975), German artist
- Rita Ackermann (born 1968), Hungarian-American artist
- Theo Akkermann (1907–1982), German sculptor

== Jurists ==
- Gustav Adolph Ackermann (1791–1872), a German lawyer
- Lourens Ackermann (1934–2024), South African judge

== Performers ==
- Anna Maria Ackermann (1932–2025), Italian actress
- Dorothea Ackermann (1752–1821), German actress
- Kathrin Ackermann (born 1938), German actress
- Konrad Ernst Ackermann (1710–1771), German actor
- Marie Magdalene Charlotte Ackermann (1757–1775), German actress
- Oliver Ackermann, American musician
- Sophie Charlotte Ackermann (1714–1792), German actress
- Stefan Ackermann, German singer

== Politicians ==
- Annely Akkermann (born 1972) Estonian politician
- Annemarie Ackermann (1913–1994), German politician
- Anton Ackermann (1905–1973), German foreign minister
- Barbara Ackermann (1925–2020), American politician
- Ernst Christian Wilhelm Ackermann (1761–1835), Bohemian public servant
- Friedrich Ackermann (1866–1931), German politician
- Jens Ackermann (born 1975), German politician
- Karl Gustav Ackermann (1820–1901), German politician
- Manfred Ackermann (1898–1991), Austrian politician and trade union official

== Sportspeople ==
- Colin Ackermann (born 1991), South African cricketer
- Henri Ackermann (1922–2014), Luxembourgish racing cyclist
- Johan Ackermann (born 1970), South African rugby union player
- Julia Ackermann (born 2007), German swimmer
- Klaus Ackermann (born 1946), German footballer
- Pascal Ackermann, German cyclist
- Ronny Ackermann (born 1977), German skier
- Rosemarie Ackermann (born 1952), German high jumper
- Stephanus Ackermann (born 1985), Namibian cricketer
- Uwe Ackermann (born 1960), East German hurdler

== Others ==
- Georg Ackermann (disambiguation)
- Hans Ackermann (16th century), German dramatist
- Jessie Ackermann (1857–1951), social reformer, feminist, writer, traveller
- Johan Christian Ackermann (1740–1795), Swedish landscape gardener
- Josef Ackermann (disambiguation), several people with this name, including:
  - Josef Ackermann (born 1948), a Swiss banker and former chief executive officer of Deutsche Bank
- Kirk von Ackermann (died 2003), American contractor and murder victim
- Lea Ackermann (1937–2023), German nun and activist against forced prostitution and sex tourism
- Louise-Victorine Ackermann (1813–1890), French poet
- Otto Ackermann (disambiguation)
- Rudolph Ackermann (1764–1834), German-born English publisher, printer, and inventor
- Stephan Ackermann (born 1963), German bishop
- Wilhelm Heinrich Ackermann (1789–1848), German teacher
