= Wanderbühne =

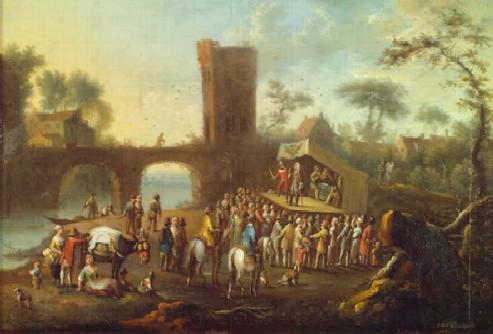
Johann Chr. Vollert: Wandertheater am Flussufer um 1750

Deutsche Wanderbühne (German Travelling Theatres) is the term for roving German-speaking, theatrical troupes or travelling operas, consisting of professional actors and musicians. They were financially independent but did not have their own fixed stage.

Such travelling troupes in Germany had, since the 17th century, developed themselves in opposition to the German Princely Court Theatres (Hoftheatern). They entertained the people with farces, theatrical travesties and parodies of the courtly tragedies and operas. Their productions followed a particular structure known as Haupt- und Staatsaktion, which featured one larger ‘main’ production alongside several smaller skits and more improvised acts – the content often included political content, relating to affairs of state. With the rise of the first national theatres in Germany, these forms of drama gradually became less significant in the 18th century – even though Wanderbühne were visiting German towns until well into the 19th century.

== The organisation of a Wanderbühne ==
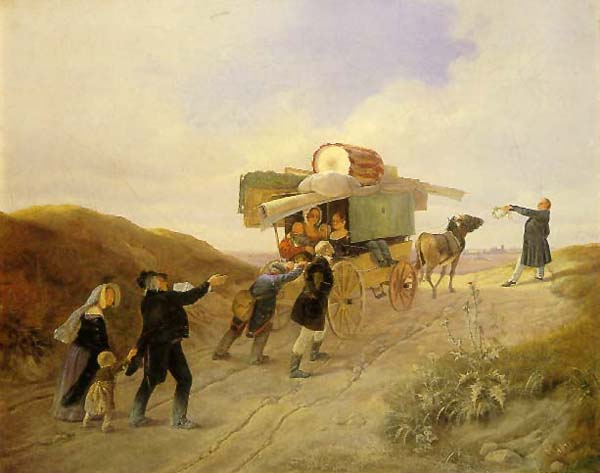
Spitzweg: Reisende Komödianten um 1838

The organisation of Deutsche Wanderbühne remained roughly the same from the 17th to the 19th century. The travelling actors came together within the structures of so-called dramatic or acting societies – in essence, these were mostly family businesses under the leadership of a Prinzipal. This theatrical business was the organisational and artistic driver of these privately led troupes. They also usually provided the necessary licences, financial backing, props and costumes.

The Prinzipal made decisions on the engagement of new or additional actors. Furthermore, he took care of discipline; managed the financial income and outgoings; chose and edited the new plays; and devised the programme and staging locations. In certain circumstances, Deutsche Wanderbühne had a ‘Theatre Master’ for special areas of expertise, such as set-design, special effects or the organisation of the technical processes. When this was not the case, the Prinzipal would take responsibility for these matters in addition to his usual tasks such as: assigning roles, leading rehearsals and overseeing the theatrical business. For required orchestral elements of performances, an ensemble local to the performance location would normally be contracted in. At that time, there was not yet a director in the modern sense of the word. However, a ballet master was required for tableaux vivants.

Actors learned their trade predominantly within dance training. Friedrich Ludwig Schröder started his career as a ‘Tumbler’. Joseph Anton Christ also proudly reported that he had performed ballet. Furthermore, a training in singing was also part of the actor’s skill-set, as they were required to perform a form of German musical theatre known as Singspiele (comparable to early opera).

The Prinzipal was also the one who possessed the requisite performance licences from the respective provincial Lords; at that time, without such permissions, travelling theatre troupes were not allowed to perform within Germanic territories. Princes would bestow these privileges upon their favoured acting groups. It was customary that they made appearances at court theatres and that they were also given the title of a court’s official acting troupe.

The theatrical troupe would normally make guest appearances as part of tournaments taking place at localities within their allocated performance territories. In small towns, performances were mostly carried out as open-air theatre on wooden stages at marketplaces or squares. Whilst in bigger areas it was possible to perform in purpose-built showing booths – known as Schaubuden – at guest-houses, barns and other similar locations. If the troupe performed in one fixed building, the Prinzipal held a lease at his own risk. There were only ever artistic directors at the larger court theatres, and directors appointed by civic authorities or organisations only became customary for the first time in the 19th century.

Because only a small number of troupes were given performance rights within a territory, there was hard-fought competition between theatrical groups. This led to the poaching of the opposition's popular and well-known acting talents. Troupes that did not receive performance rights had to spread out to new areas, which led to the Wanderbühne reaching far into Russia and into Baltic regions where parts of the population spoke German.

== The production programme of a Wanderbühne ==
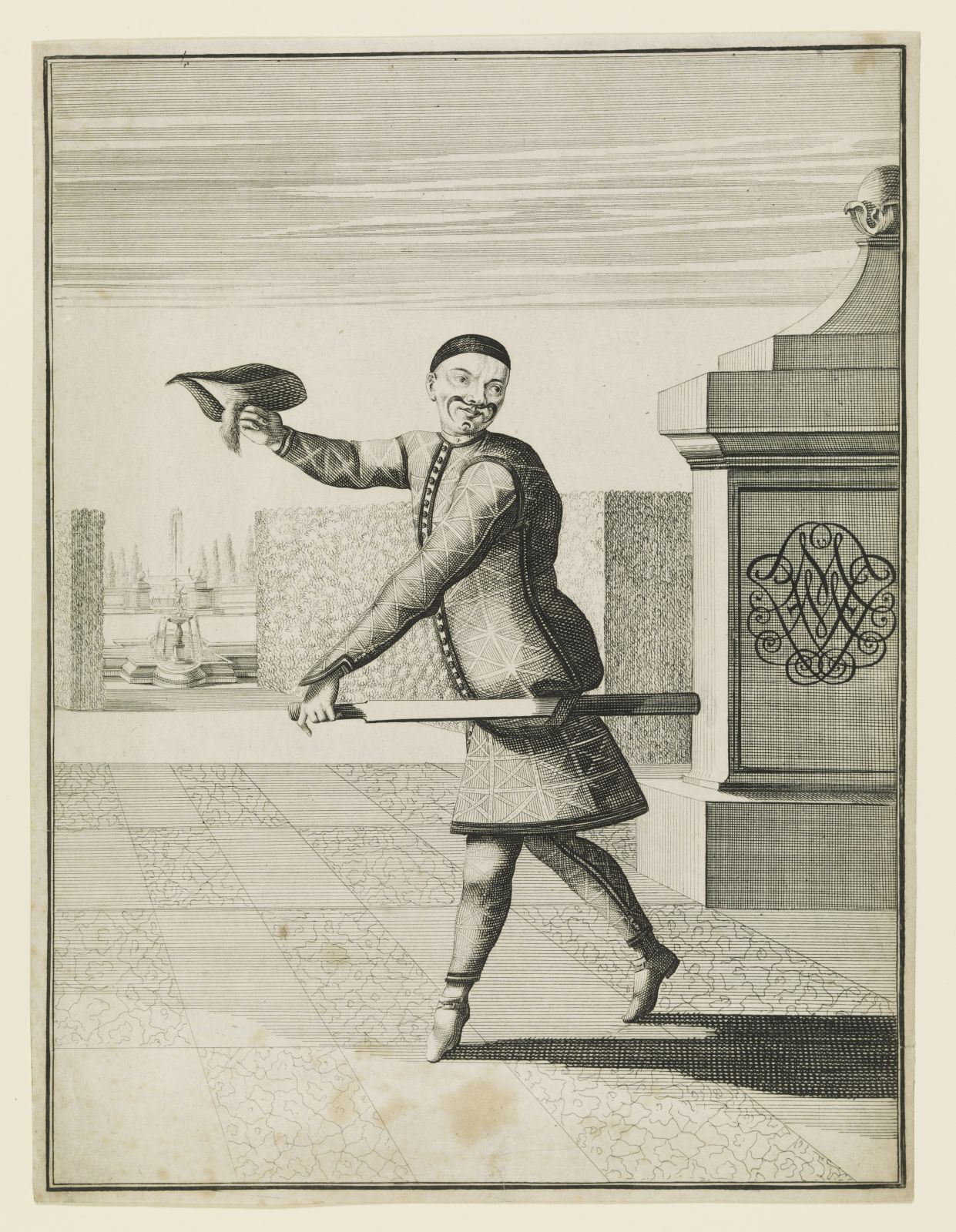
Harlequin

The private travelling theatrical troupes oriented their programme of productions almost exclusively towards an often uneducated public who were seeking humorous entertainment; these Wanderbühne were dependent upon the donations and entrance fees paid by such audiences. In order to ensure that they did not lose the public's interest, theatre troupes had to regularly perform new plays. This meant that poetic patterning was only roughly adhered to – or in some cases it was completely left out and the actors improvised. This was because there was not sufficient time to constantly study new plays in depth.

Theatre in the Wanderbühne was primarily concerned with pure entertainment and amusement. The programme was dominated by the aforementioned Haupt- und Staatsaktion forms. They centred around innuendos, bawdy jokes and farcical interludes involving Harlequin or Hanswurst characters. The performances consisted of a sequence of action-packed individual acts, which sometimes involved aspects of situational comedy. These acts were made into a spectacle in which the visual effects of lavish costumes, grandiose sets and attention-grabbing special-effects were considered to be more important than the quality of the acting. This was partly because, during that period, a completely different understanding of art was dominant and the role of acting tended to be seen as the work of a tradesman or craftsman.

It was customary that actors were proficient in the puppet-show, because restricted space often didn’t allow for them to perform on a bigger stage. Therefore, puppet-shows were part of the ‘bad-weather programme’.

In keeping with the English and Italian models of travelling theatre, the Wanderbühne practised a form of improvised drama, in which the style of delivery was shaped improvisations, type-cast roles and realistic clarity. The actors specialised in playing particular types of role or even fixed roles – parts that would appear again and again, which fitted best with the actors’ gender, age and appearance. Those that were able to provide the clearest embodiment of characters by over-acting, were often considered to be the best actors.

Interaction between individual players did not exist in the modern sense, due to the fact that the actors took over studying for the part, the often over-the-top costumes (the Prinzipal provided them with what was known as ‘costume money’) and competed to win the approval of the public. In this way the directorial duties of the Prinzipal were limited to allocating the actors with roles, and ensuring that they were positioned on-stage in the correct relation to one another.

== The unique form of Wanderoper or ‘Travelling Opera’ ==
One unique form of theatre performed during the 18th century was the ‘Travelling Opera’ or Wanderoper. It was performed in the German court theatres as well as on the travelling stages of the Wanderbühne. In addition to the singers, the Wanderoper had additional instrumentalists, whose instruments, music and music-stands had to be carried by the troupe – unless musicians local to the particular destinations were used instead. This theatre-form also required intensive preparation and a musical director. Improvisation did not always exist as it did in the theatrical acts. In the intervals, however, entertainers, such as rope dancers, also made appearances. As from the middle of the century, the emphasis on Italian opera reverted to the German courts, a bourgeois interest in ‘singing and light operas’ arose. Following the style of the famous Italian wanderers such as those of the Girolamo Bon, German operatic groups arose, working as entrepreneurial businesses. These include the troupes of Johann Friedrich Schönemann (1704–1782), Abel Seyler (1730–1800) with the Seyler Theatre Company (founded 1769) and Emanuel Schikaneder (1751–1812). These theatrical ensembles had both musical and spoken theatre in their repertoires.

== Historical development ==
=== Middle Ages and Renaissance ===
The theatrical landscape of the German-speaking regions in the middle-ages and the Renaissance period was characterised by religiously motivated spiritual performances, which were originally directed or led by clergy, and later also used as representations of civic service in the Middle Ages. The purpose of Mystery and Passion Play, Fastnachtspiele, or the Jesuit and the Protestant school of scholarship lay above all in the conversion, the instruction and the moral education of society. These performances were often assisted by many citizens who were highly regarded as amateur actors. The German amateur-theatres enjoyed great popularity and remained long after the end of their prominence, even though they lost importance with the emergence of the first foreign travelling theatrical groups.

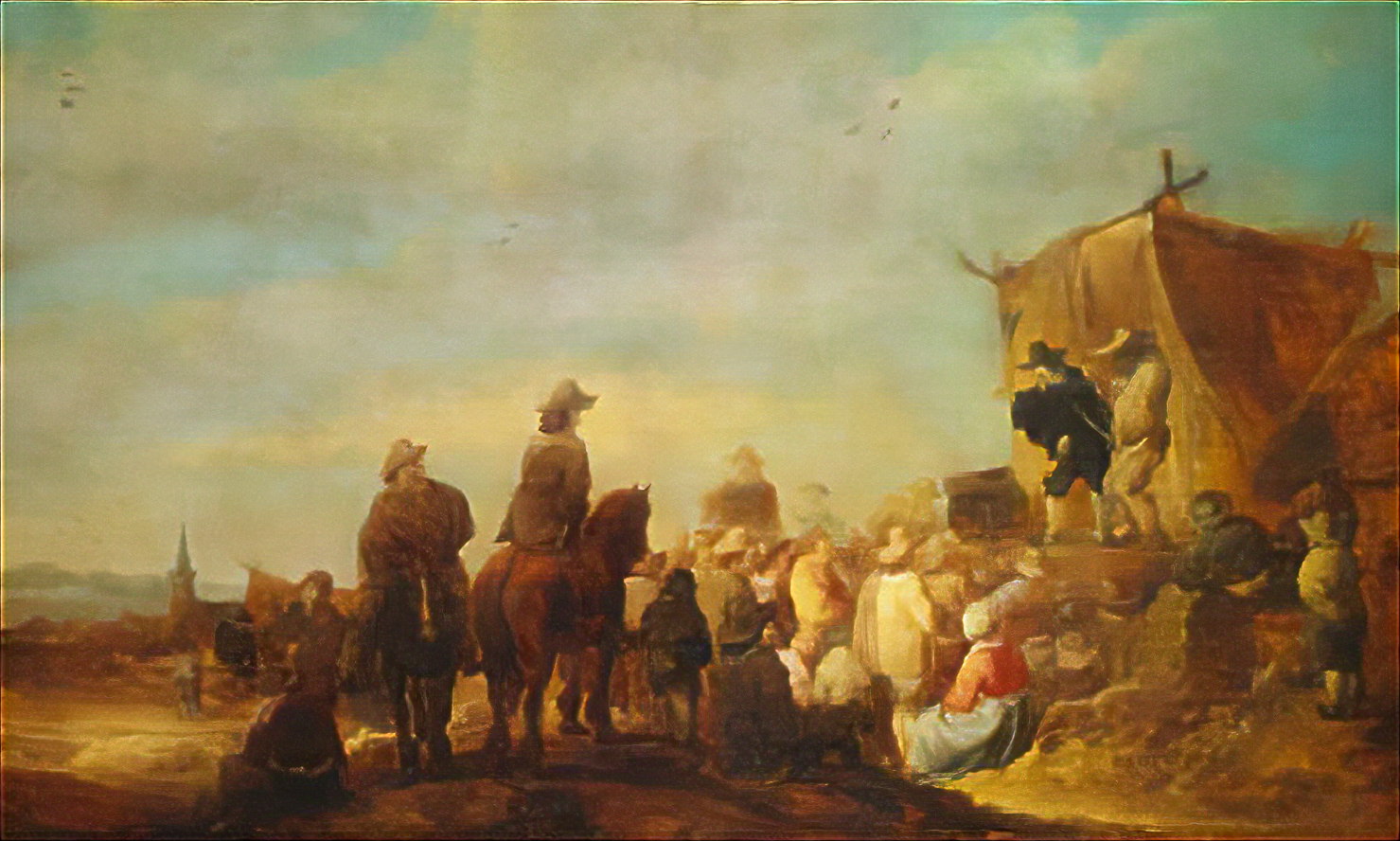
Benjamin Cuyp: Wanderschausteller around 1645, Niederlande

The first Italian acting troupes moved across the Alps at the end of the fifteenth century, but played primarily in aristocratic circles, in which the Italian was powerful. With the development of Italian opera as the most popular form of theatre at the European courts after 1600, many of the Italian comedy groups in the German region saw themselves forced to open up to new audiences because they could not compete with this new form of musical theatre. Thus, they turned to the German middle class, which, however, did not understand Italian. The Commedia dell'arte performances of the Italian theatre groups developed into a sort of pantomime whose comic action was mediated by masks and exaggerated gestures and movement.

By the end of the sixteenth and seventeenth centuries, the English comedians of the Elizabethan Theatre moved across Denmark and the Netherlands into the German-speaking areas. As a result, there was a struggle between these and the Italian theatre groups for the attention of the German public, which was complicated by the arrival of French troupes in the 18th century.

=== The beginnings of independence ===
In the 17th century, in the German-speaking world, a German professional theatre was formed in response to the foreign theatrical groups. This development began with the inclusion of German actors in the ensembles of English troupes, which gradually led to purely German-speaking travelling theatrical groups.

From the English models, the texts were taken as the basis for performances, in which elements of the Commedia dell'arte were also added. Thus, at Wanderbühne, a unique form of comedy appeared. The German-speaking counterpart to Pickelhering or Arlecchino was the comic figure of the Viennese Hanswurst, created by Stranitzky, who appeared as an added servant figure in transposed and strongly coarsened versions of French or Italian tragedies, which served as a template for his jokes.

In addition to the troupes that offered stories and tales of adventure to the general public, theatre groups were also formed that played at the princely courts and before the educated public. One example of this was the Hochdeutsche Hofcomödianten and their successor groups, which brought important innovations in the landscape of the Wanderbühne: longer, more literarily elaborate plays, dramas and female actors for women's roles. In addition to adaptations of English, Italian and French materials (such as Shakespeare and Molière), German materials for plays were also used.

=== Enlightenment ===
At the beginning of the eighteenth century, the literary enlightenment and the Leipzig circle (surrounding the literary theorist Johann Christoph Gottsched) led to a reform of the German theatre, modelled on French classical music. As a result, the German Wanderbühne, especially the Neubauer group run by the Prinzipal and stage reformer Caroline Neuber, began to stick more closely to the poetical models of the mostly French theatrical texts. They also implement them by means of the French-pathetic theatrical style.

This demanded a greater skill from the actors and helped the German theatre to reach a higher artistic standard. However, this led to criticism in France, as well as in Germany, at a time which had already set itself free from the classical models. The French representation, with its courtly costumes and gestures, designed for typification and representation, was not understood by the less educated German public, and therefore remained unsuccessful.

Abel Seyler, the de facto leader of the Hamburg National Theatre and principal of the Seyler Theatre Company

It was only with Conrad Ekhof and other well-known traveling actors of the time that a certain, self-developed, realism and a beginning of ensemble performance gradually developed in the middle and at the end of the 18th century. In addition, during the same period, the first national theatres were established with fixed theatrical ensembles, in which most of the German travelling troupes rose to prominence over time. By "national" one meant a cultural, linguistic commonality in the German-speaking area, which was still fragmented by parochialism. The privately financed Hamburgische Entreprise, where Gotthold Ephraim Lessing worked as dramaturge, was only able to survive between 1767 and 1769, but by the end of the 1820s, there were already over 65 regularly-recorded theatres in the German-speaking area.

=== 19th century ===
The distinction between drama, opera and ballet groups was still fluid in the 19th century. The composer Albert Lortzing began, for example, as an actor and singer in the Josef Derossi group. The theatre composer Adolf Müller (senior) also began his career as a travelling actor. Richard Wagner did not seem to be an actor like his siblings (though he was obliged to take part in the ballet in his first contract as a chordirigent in Würzburg), but he was still engaged with a travelling troupe in the 1830s in Bad Lauchstädt.

Due to the expansion of the cities in the 19th century, the need for entertainment increased, but the Wanderbühne were pushed back. Fixed theatres, modeled on the Parisian Boulevard theaters, were founded like the Königsstädtisches Theater Berlin. In this transitional period, the poet and actor Karl von Holtei describes the decline of the wandering troops in his novel Der letzte Komödiant (1863). When, in the German-speaking area, audiences were being entertained by the comedy Raub der Sabinerinnen in 1884, the Wanderbühne had already disappeared.

=== 20th century ===
As a result of the theatrical low-brow in music halls or singing halls, and with the spread of the boulevard piece and operetta, a new kind of mostly individual, but often multi-disciplinary, actor has emerged since the end of the 19th century. Helmut Qualtinger portrayed this type of performer with his cabaret Der Menschheit Würde ist in eure Hand gegeben (based on Friedrich Schiller's poem ‘The Artists’) – in which two small-scale actors discuss their stage roles during the period of National Socialism in the German-speaking theatres of Czechoslovakia and Eastern Europe.

== Social standing ==
=== Professionalisation ===
Jede schauspielerische Leistung ist eine künstlerische Selbstpreisgabe […].
Selbstpreisgabe aus Spieltrieb oder aus weltanschaulicher, gar aus religiöser
oder aus pädagogischer Berufung schien erlaubt und sogar in vieler Hinsicht
erwünscht. Selbstpreisgabe als Beruf hingegen, Selbstpreisgabe gegen Entgelt
– um der Belustigung oder um tragischer Sensationswirkungen vor täglich
anderen Zuschauern willen – erschien zunächst als so fragwürdig, als so
jenseits allerseelisch-sittlichen Normen, daß man die Angehörigen dieses
frühen Schauspielerstandes vielfach weder zu den wesentlichsten Sakramenten
zuließ noch ihnen ein christliches Begräbnis gönnte.

[Every performance is an artistic self-promotion [...]. Self-promotion from the instinct of play or from ideological, even from religious or educational vocations, seemed allowed and even in many respects it seemed to be desired. Self-promotion as a profession, on the other hand, daily self-surrender against payment - for amusement or for a tragic sensation for the sake of other spectators - appeared at first to be questionable and beyond all moral norms. So much so that the members of early actor-class were often denied the essential sacraments and refused a proper Christian burial.]

In addition, the traveller’s existence stood in contradiction to the bourgeois ideal of sedentariness, which is why actors enjoyed a bad reputation. Thus, actors were generally regarded as tricksters and as failures with hedonistic lifestyles. As a rule, they had to be buried outside the cemetery walls.

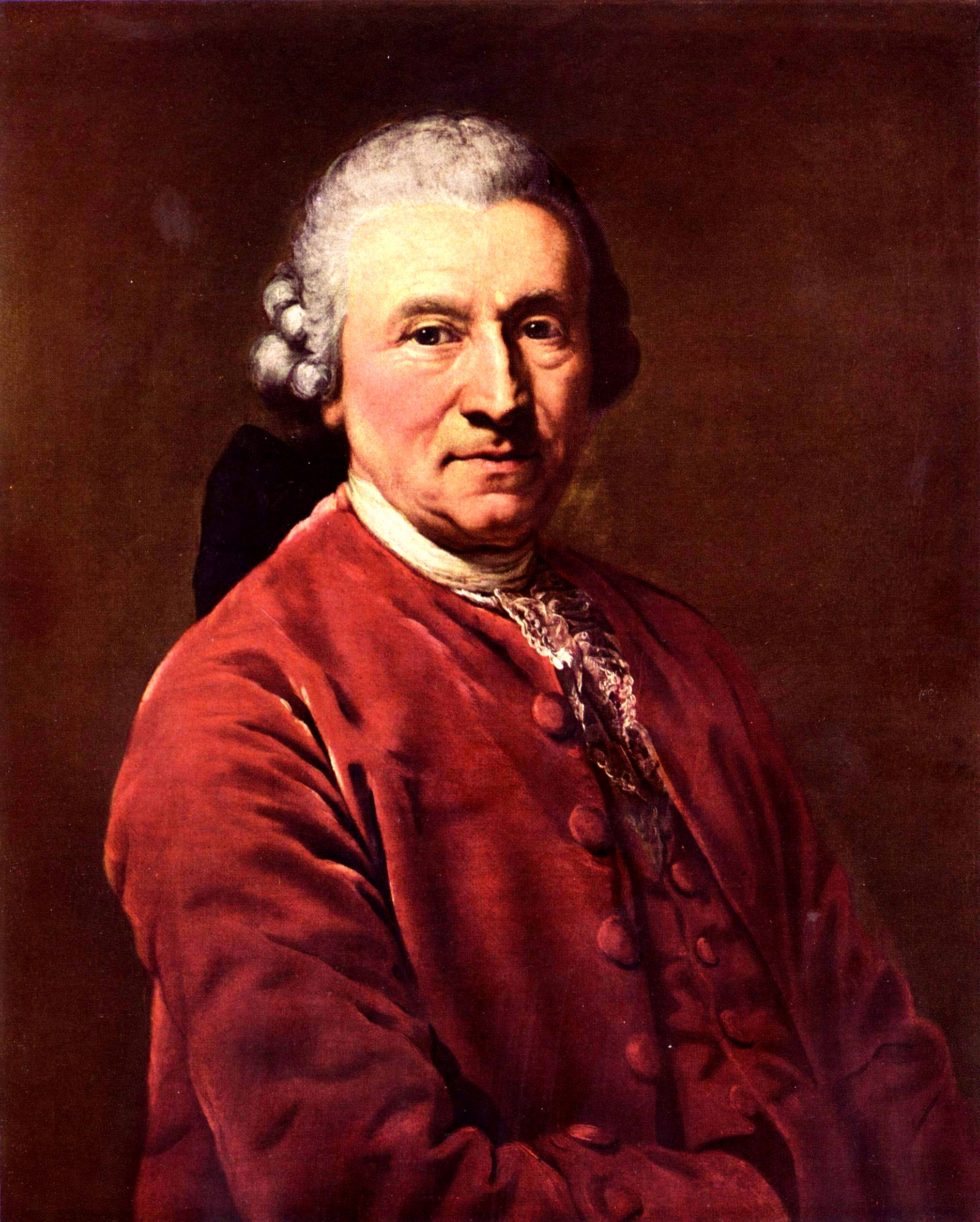
Conrad Ekhof (1720–1778)

This changed only with the theatre reforms in the first half of the 18th century. They sought to respect the theatrical actors as artists and thus to raise the demands on the educational level of the actor-class. The actors came to a large extent from acting families, but also increasingly from circles with some education; for example, students – since reading was an important basic requirement of the profession. In addition, efforts were made to counteract the bad reputation of actors by way of leading more decent and more moral lives. The actors were only successful in improving their standing as valued artists much later than musicians. .

It was also the travelling actors themselves who sought to improve the artistic and social prestige of the drama and of its standing. They thus decisively contributed to the development of German theatre and a "German" culture, which, after the wars of liberation, led to an increase in urban and national theatres.

The acting troupes were also the first commissioners to employ the young German dramaturges (such as Gotthold Ephraim Lessing) and thus helped the German-language drama to have its breakthrough. Finally, the first professional actors emerged from the travelling troupes, which laid the foundations for today's theatre culture in Germany.

=== Female actors ===
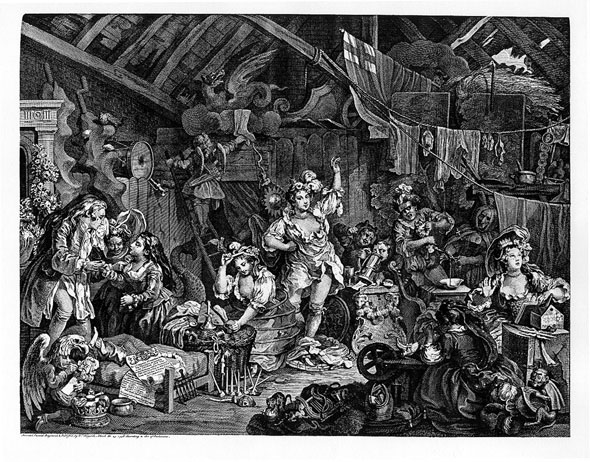
William Hoarth: Strolling Actresses Dressing in a Barn

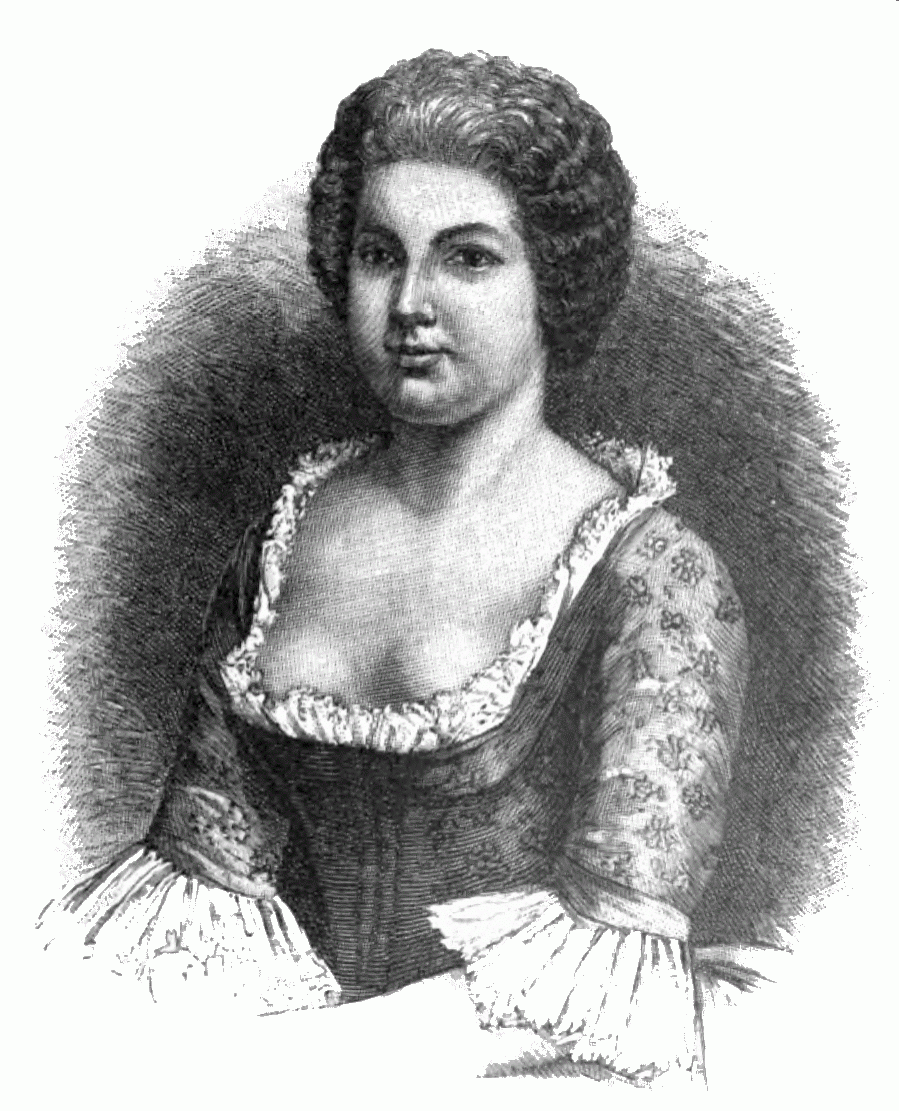
Die Neuberin (Neuer Theater-Almanach, 1898)

In the early 17th century, women's roles were still played by men and the theater companies in Germany appear to have been made up entirely of male actors. In the mid 17th century however women started to appear onstage, and in September 1655, "female players" are noted to have been performed in Frankfurt for the first time. Under Magister Velthen and his father-in-law, the first actresses were employed in Germany. Velthens wife Catharina Elisabeth Velten (1646–1712) acted with her mother and sister on stage in first in her father's and then in her husband's theater, and after her husband's death, she managed his theater and continued his policy of employing women. To show that they were suited to being an actor, the women also appeared in male roles. The costumes of the ladies were the most expensive, of those needed by a travelling troupe. Therefore, some actresses were engaged because of the wardrobe that they were able to provide.

In the 18th and 19th centuries, individual actresses successfully managed a remarkable social rise, whether that involved marrying admirers from upper-classes, or becoming Prinzipals and dramatists themselves. The first woman to become Prinzipal was Catharina Elisabeth Velten after the death of her husband. Prinzipal Friederike Caroline Neuber has the reputation of having banished Hanswurst from the German stage (although she only managed to suppress him partially because, for economic reasons, she could not do without the character in her own group). In 1753, she founded the first German actors' academy and was involved in the beginnings of the Hamburg National Theater (1767-1769).

As an actress, director, Prinzipal and dramatist, Charlotte Birch-Pfeiffer also had a significant influence on the German-speaking theatre scene in the first half of the 19th century.

== Prinzipals and their acting groups in the 17th and 18th centuries ==
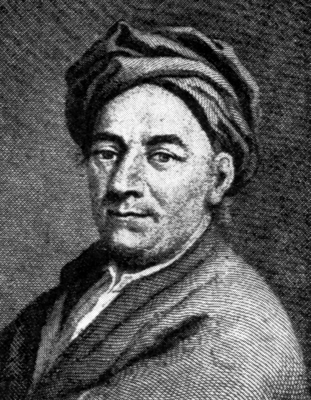
Heinrich Gottfried Koch (1703–1775)

- Konrad Ernst Ackermann (1712–1771), founded the Ackermann company in 1751; after his death his widow Sophie Charlotte Schröder and his son-in-law Friedrich Ludwig Schröder continued the company
- Johann Heinrich Böhm (1740–1792)
- Pasquale Bondini († 1789), führte die Bondinische Gesellschaft in Leipzig, Dresden und Prag
- Abel Seyler (1730–1800) founded the Seyler Theatre Company in 1769
- Josef Derossi: (1768–1841), Leiter der Düsseldorfer Theatergesellschaft
- Karl Theophil Döbbelin (1727–1793)
- Eberweinische Truppe Gotha
- Conrad Ekhof (1720–1778), zwischen 1775 und 1778 Co-Direktor am Gothaer Hoftheater
- Andreas Elenson (um 1645–um 1706), Gründer der Elenson-Haake-Hofmannschen Truppe
- Simon Friedrich Koberwein (1733–nach 1803),
- Heinrich Gottfried Koch (1703–1775), gründete 1749 die Kochsche Truppe
- Johann Joseph Felix von Kurz (1717–1784)
- Langesche Gesellschaft Naumburg
- Theobald Marchand (1741–1800), Gründer der Marchandschen Theatergesellschaft (Mainz/Mannheim)
- Friedrich Wilhelm Bossann (1756–1813), führte ab 1786 die Neuhausische Theatergesellschaft und gab ihr seinen Namen (Mainz/Rheinland; Engagement der Truppe nach Anhalt 1794 begründete das heutige Anhaltische Theater)
- Friederike Caroline Neuber, die „Neuberin“ (1697–1760), Leiterin der Neuberschen Komödiantengesellschaft (1725–1750)
- Filippo Nicolini († um 1775), Leiter einer Pantomimengruppe
- Carl Andreas Paulsen (1620–1679), founded the Hochdeutsche Hofcomödianten in cirka 1650; his son-in-law Johannes Velten (1640–1692) and then his daughter Catharina Elisabeth Velten (1646–1712) continued the company
- Johann Friedrich Schönemann (1704–1782), Schönemannsche Gesellschaft (1740–1757)
- Johann Carl Tilly, Gründer der Tillyschen Truppe (Mecklenburg/Vorpommern)
- Johann August Ulich (died 1710), founder of the Hochteutsche Comoedianten; after his death his widow Eleonora Constantia Ulich continued the company
- Johannes Velten auch „Magister Velthen“ (1640–1691/91), gründete um 1670 die erste deutsche Schauspielgesellschaft von Bedeutung.
- Johann Christian Wäser, Maria Barbara Wäser, Leiter der Wäserschen Gesellschaft in Schlesien und Preußen

== Literature ==
- Carl Heine: Das Schauspiel der deutschen Wanderbühne vor Gottsched. Halle, S. 1889.
- Hermann Maas: Äussere Geschichte der englischen Theatertruppen in dem Zeitraum von 1559 bis 1642. Louvain, Leipzig 1907.
- Rudolf Schirmer (ed.): Schauspielerleben im 18. Jahrhundert. Erinnerungen von Joseph Anton Christ. Langewiesche-Brandt, München und Leipzig 1912.
- Konrad Schiffmann (ed.): Jakob Neukäufler (1754–1835). Aus dem Leben eines Wanderschauspielers. Feichtingers Erben, Linz 1930.
- Herbert Junkers: Niederländische Schauspieler und niederländisches Schauspiel im 17. und 18. Jahrhundert in Deutschland. Nijhoff, Haag 1938.
- Haide Marie Brandt: Die Holtorf-Truppe – Wesen und Wirken einer Wanderbühne. Berlin 1960.
- Bärbel Rudin (ed.): Wanderbühne – Theaterkunst als fahrendes Gewerbe. Berlin 1988.
- Peter Schmitt: Schauspieler und Theaterbetrieb – Studien zur Sozialgeschichte des Schauspielerstandes 1700–1900. Tübingen 1990.
- Wolfgang Bender (ed.): Schauspielkunst im 18. Jahrhundert. Stuttgart 1992, ISBN 3-515-05990-3.
- Simon Williams: German Actors of the Eighteenth and Nineteenth Centuries. Idealism, Romanticism and Realism. Greenwood, Westport 1985. ISBN 0-313-24365-4.
- Roland Dreßler: Von der Schaubühne zur Sittenschule – Das Theaterpublikum vor der vierten Wand. Berlin 1993, ISBN 3-894-87181-4.
- Michael Rueppel: Nur zwei Jahre Theater, und alles ist zerruettet – Bremer Theatergeschichte von den Anfängen bis zum Ende des 18. Jahrhunderts. Winter, Heidelberg 1996, Online.
- Wilhelm Herrmann: Hoftheater – Volkstheater – Nationaltheater – die Wanderbühnen im Mannheim des 18. Jahrhunderts und ihr Beitrag zur Gründung des Nationaltheaters. Frankfurt a.M. 1999, ISBN 3-631-34645-X.
- Renate Möhrmann [ed.]: Die Schauspielerin – eine Kulturgeschichte. Frankfurt a. M. 2000, ISBN 3-458-34365-2.
- Claudia Puschmann: Fahrende Frauenzimmer – Zur Geschichte der Frauen an deutschen Wanderbühnen (1670–1760). Herbolzheim 2000, ISBN 3-8255-0272-4.
- Eduard Devrient: Geschichte der Deutschen Schauspielkunst. Henschelverlag Kunst und Gesellschaft (Lizenz Verlag Langen Müller), Berlin 1967, Band 1, Abschnitt Die regelmäßige Schauspielkunst unter Prinzipalschaft: S. 279–476.
- Eike Pies, Prinzipale - zur Genealogie d. deutschsprachigen Berufstheaters vom 17. bis 19. Jahrhundert, A. Henn Verlag Düsseldorf, 1973, ISBN 3-450-01061-1.
- Albrecht: Die Sterne dürfet ihr verschwenden – Schauspielererinnerungen des 18. und 19. Jahrhunderts. Buchverlag Der Morgen Berlin, 1980.
- Ludwig Wollrabe: Der Franzosen-Müller. (Biographie des Schauspielers Carl Theodor Müller) Druck und Commissions-Verlag von J. B. Klein, Crefeld 1842. (online).
- Petra Oelker: Die Neuberin, Rowohlt Verlag Reinbek bei Hamburg 2004, ISBN 978-3-499-23740-9, Leseprobe.
- Alexander Martin: From the Holy Roman Empire to the Land of the Tsars: One Family’s Odyssey, 1768-1870 (microhistorical study of a German actor). Oxford UP, Oxford, 2022.

== See also ==
- History of theatre
