= History of theatre in Cologne =

History of the Cologne Theatre

The history of the theatre in Cologne, Germany, has its roots in the Middle Ages. Although there are references to the existence of a Late antiquity Cologne theatre in the Roman Colonia Claudia Ara Agrippinensium, as has also been proven for other Roman cities (e.g. Mainz, Trier or Xanten). Despite this culture of theatrical play cultivated in the Roman past, a direct link to this time and form does not take place until centuries later. Although Cologne was one of the most important cities in Europe in the Middle Ages, the city had no significance in the theatre sector. The indecisiveness of the mayors over the centuries marked Cologne as an exception among major German cities in the field of theatre. After the revival of this art, theatre in Cologne also underwent a change to modern history.

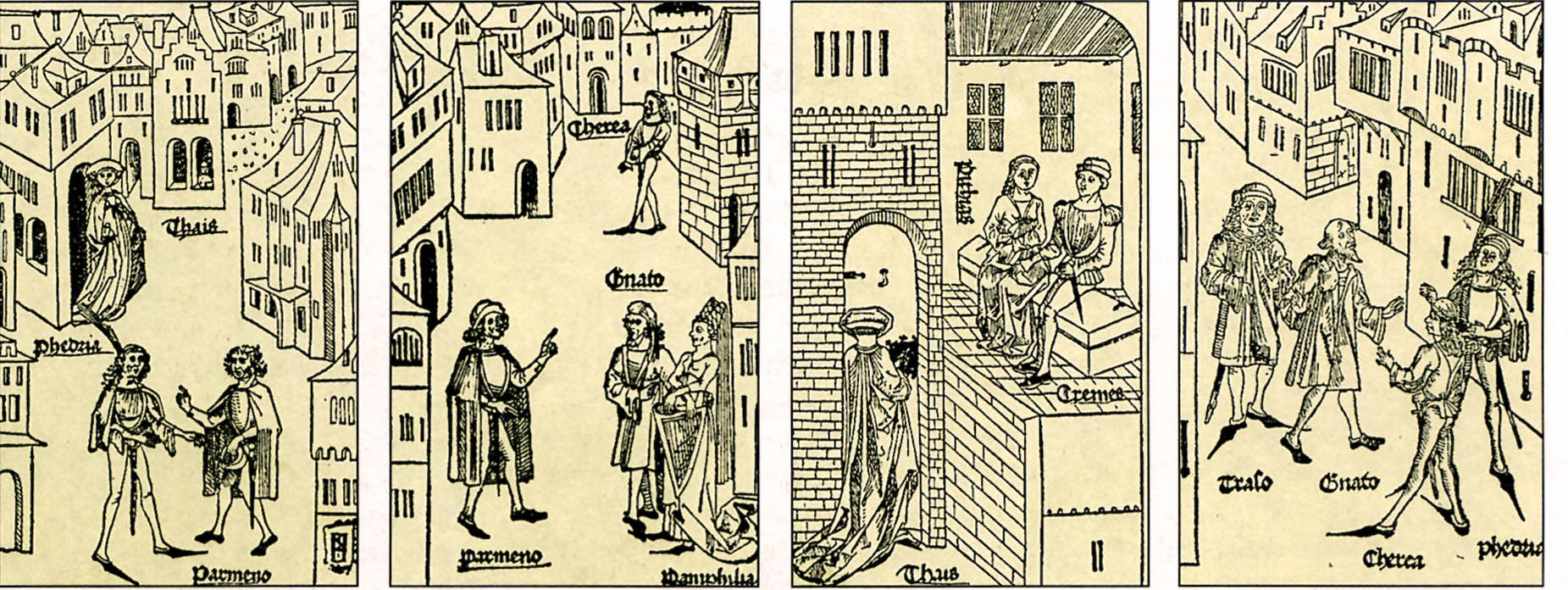
Terenzbühne ca 1496, from a Terence edition

== Forerunner of the Cologne Theatre ==
While in the Middle Ages "drama" was primarily an ecclesiastical affair (mystery and passion plays), in that the faithful were usually offered staged performances of the saints' stories were offered to the faithful mostly on feast days, so the citizens of Cologne experienced, in addition to improvised burlesques and emerging carnival plays, the performance of a plays as a performance of a bourgeois ensemble for the first time in 1539.

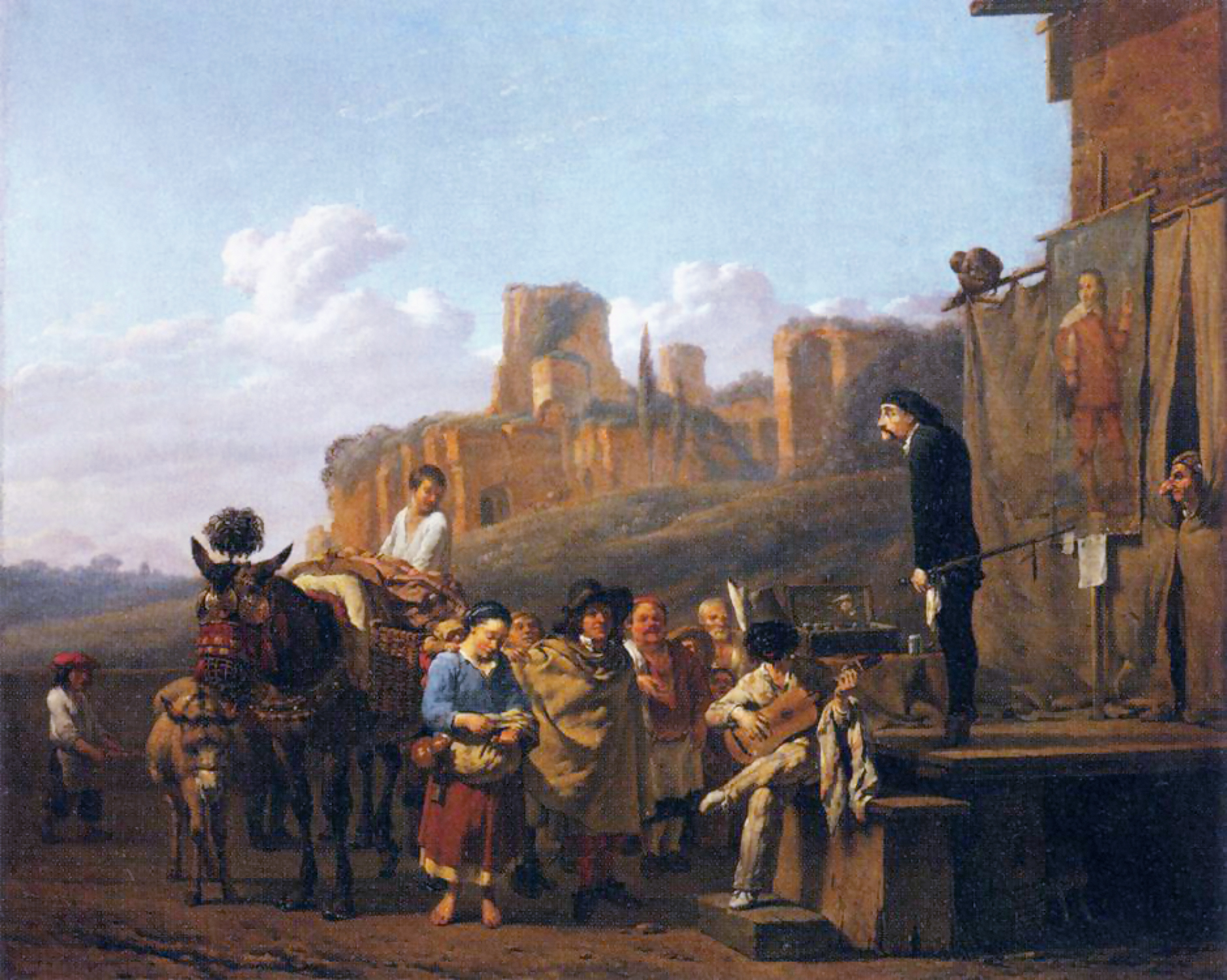
Commedia dell'arte performance on an improvised play scaffold, painting by Karel Dujardin, 1657

The play Homolus oder der Sünden loin ist der Toid by the printer Jaspar von Gennep (c. 1500–1564) was shown. Its stage success showed the progressive secularisation of thought, in which the bourgeoisie also gradually took this culture into its own hands. Since the ecclesiastical plays of the Middle Ages did not focus on the performers' own pleasure in artistic activity, nor did they have the incentive of a [fees, they were emotion-less cults or rituals procedures. Thus the Homulus actors were all laymen from Cologne's bourgeoisie, who followed an artfully designed plots with zeal and talent.

As Hermann von Weinsberg reports, the dramas performed by An der Rechtschule enjoyed great popularity. For example, the tragedy of Saint Lawrence was first performed in 1581 by the scholars of the Gymnasium Laurentianum Köln and repeated for years on St. Laurence's Day (10 August) in front of numerous spectators.

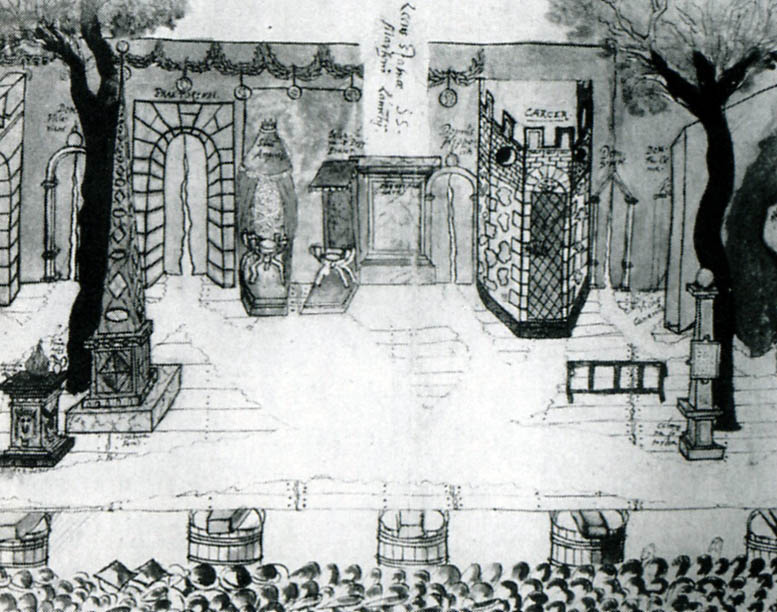
Theatre of the Kölner Laurentianer Burse ca 1581

The first printed document that has come down to us from "Bertram von Hilden" from the year 1620 is a leaflet of a student performance at the Montaner Gymnasium, in which a programme of the drama about the king Assuerus Xerxes was described.

It was not until the 17th century that amateur actors became professional actors, following the example of English pickelherings, which travelled the country with Wanderbühnen. In this way, they combined the pleasant with the useful and earned their living with acting talent. The performances usually took place in the afternoons and initially in the open air. Later, a podium made of planks was erected especially for the performances at the edge of busy alleys or in squares, such as the Heumarkt. Cologne's first theatre buildings were not princely buildings, but private theatres or municipal properties. Among the latter was the "Ballhaus auf der Apostelstraße", a hall of the Bruloff House on the Quatermarkt (opposite the Gürzenich) - very often used for theatre performances - with a capacity for 800 people. This house belonged to the Quatermarkt family (previously Hartmann dem Wisen) in the early 14th century, to the Hardevust von Vaitalmershoven family until 1417, and passed to the city in 1561. It began as a "Katzbahn" in 1595 and is attested as a ballroom from 1648; its tenant was Niclas Kisselstein. It was demolished in 1827 due to dilapidation. The "Gebuirhaus" of the parish of St. Brigiden at the Alter Markt also functioned as a theatre. At that time, all performances were subject to the supervision of the Cologne Council. In addition, since the 17th century, there have been performances at irregular intervals in several Zunfthäusern.

== A wooden house on the Neumarkt ==
For a long time, the Cologne Council had always been opposed to attempts to establish a permanent stage in the city. Franz Joseph Sebastiani, headmaster of a travelling theatre group, arrived at the Heumarkt with his travelling stage on 27 May 1763 and proposed a "Bretterhaus zur Opera" there, which, however, could not be realised due to citizen protests. Further construction was stopped by the city on 11 June 1763. On 14 June 1763, it was assigned a place on the Neumarkt, "on the Maur against St. Aposteln". On 8 July 1763, he invited the Council of the City of Cologne to a performance there. Sebastiani finally asked the city again in a letter dated 7 June 1765 for permission to erect a "comedy house" - again on Neumarkt. Only the theatre director Joseph Felix von Kurz, called Bernardon, was able to convince the city. He dismantled his Frankfurt theatre in May 1768 and had it transported by ship across the Rhine to Cologne. The first stationary theatre Deutsche Schaubühne opened on 19 May 1768 in a wooden house on Neumarkt. It was a simple four-storey half-timbered house, where it was draughty in winter and too hot in summer, which also served as a straw and hay store. For the opening there was the opera La serva padrona by Giovanni Battista Pergolesi. A note prepared for the opening announced "that the German theatre of Mr. Joseph von Kurtz would open with the sound of timpani and trumpets ... in the singspiel La serva padrona', translated into German by himself (Kurtz), also with 11 arias and an amusing chorus ...". This building was already dilapidated in 1779, but performances continued until 1783.

== The first permanent house ==
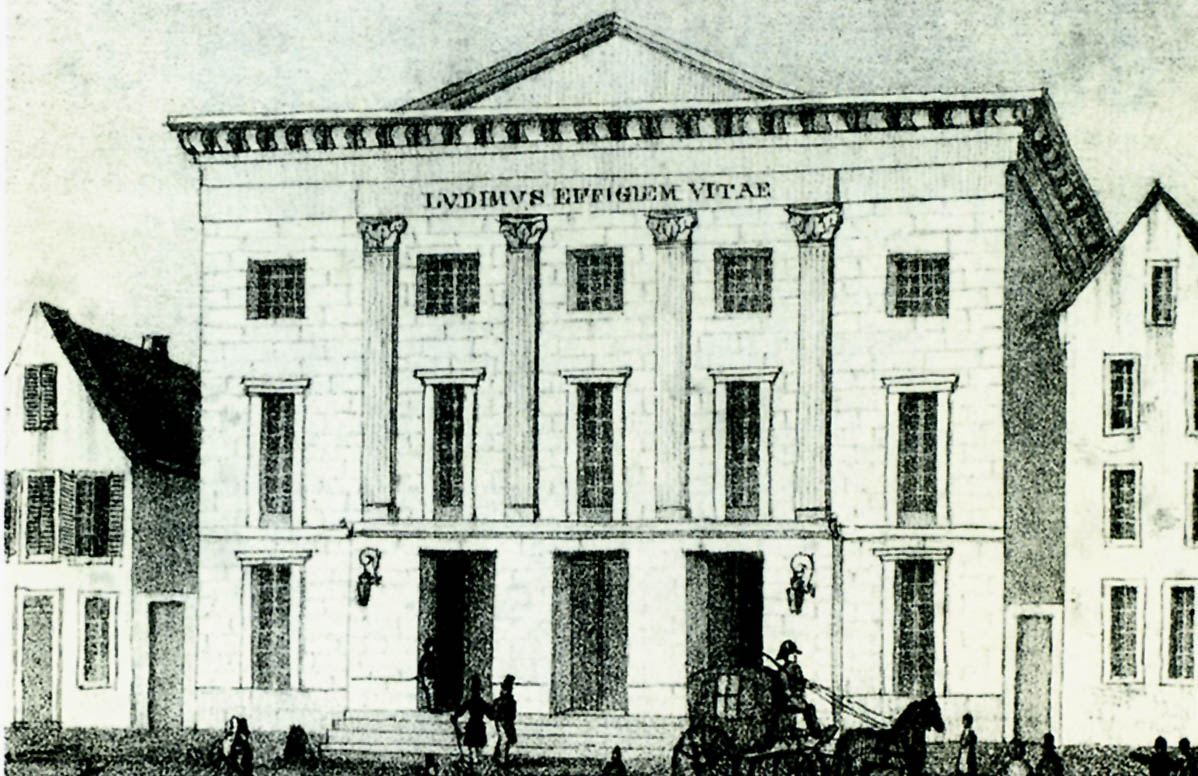
Theatre on Schmierstraße around 1869

Based on a council resolution of 6 March 1782, the burgher captain and dance hall owner Franz Caspar Rhodius was granted a 24-year licence to have a brick comedy house built on Schmierstraße next to his redoubt by city architect Johann Caspar Dechen. Schmierstraße was named after a grease and oil merchant who lived here in the Middle Ages. On 10 March 1486, the city decided to remove the strumpets from the street. Construction of the first stone theatre building began on 21 February 1782, and all important entertainments organised for a fee had to take place in the new comedy house with a capacity of 800 seats. The "new privileged comedy house" was opened at Easter 1783, with the premiere of Shakespeare's Richard II under the direction of Johann Heinrich Böhm.

The 35-metre-long, 16.90-metre-wide and 10-metre-high building bore the inscription: MUSIS GRATISQUE DECENTIBUS 1783 ("Muses are always free 1783"), and the sandstone vases attached to its façade were replicated for the Church of the Apostles in 1790. The 12.50 metre × 15 metre stage was criticised by contemporaries as being too small. The auditorium formed an amphitheatre in the shape of a pointed oval with three storeys. In 1805–1806, it received a new décor designed by Matthias Joseph de Noël and executed by Maximilian Fuchs, rich in allegories and pictorial work, with the new Empire style in "Egyptian taste" replacing the Rococo ambience. In order not to disturb spectators with carriage rattles, the Schmierstraße was cordoned off every evening. In the course of the reformation of street names during the French period, Schmierstraße was renamed Komödienstraße on 16 December 1812; the theatre was located at the height of Komödienstraße No. 40/42. The occupiers during the French period took the Komödienhaus standing on Schmierstraße as an opportunity to give the street the name "Rue de la Comédie". The Cologne collector and patron of the arts Ferdinand Franz Wallraf later successfully campaigned for the name to be changed. The theatre had to be demolished in 1827 due to dilapidation.

== Second theatre ==
In 1826, the "Stadtkölnische Theater-Actien-Verein" was founded to finance a new theatre building, financed by wealthy citizens. After a conflict over the building site, they stuck to the Komödienstraße. The Cologne architect Jakob Ignaz Hittorff, who lived in Paris, produced a design, but its execution was ultimately rejected as too expensive. The new building was finally constructed by the Cologne royal building inspector Matthias Biercher. The foundation stone for the Cologne "Comödienhaus" at Komödienstraße 42-44 was laid on 8 November 1827, and construction began in April 1828. After only 9 months of construction and building costs of 75,000 talers, the theatre offered a capacity of 1540 seats. Above its entrance was the inscription LUDIMUS EFFIGIEM VITAE ("We play an image of life"), its auditorium had good acoustics and was designed as a logentheatre with three tiers and a gallery. At 21.20 metres × 27.90 metres, the stage was one of the largest in Germany. The opening took place on 19 January 1829 with Ludwig Spohr's opera Jessonda. On 22 July 1859, it was destroyed by fire except for the surrounding walls. After reopening on 1 September 1862, another fire destroyed it on 16 February 1869, leaving 7 dead. The alternative venue, the "Actien-Theater", also burned down completely on 9 May 1869. It was located in Frohngasse between the Cologne Zoological Garden and the Flora Botanical Garden and opened on 21 April 1867 as a summer theatre. For financial reasons, it was decided to build a new theatre in Glockengasse.

The population of Cologne rose steadily during this period. Around 1867, about 125,000 citizens lived in the city, in 1871 already about 130,000 and after the incorporation of several suburbs already over 280,000. These figures, together with the economic upswing of the city, can be seen as an explanation for the construction of another theatre.

== Stadttheater Glockengasse ==
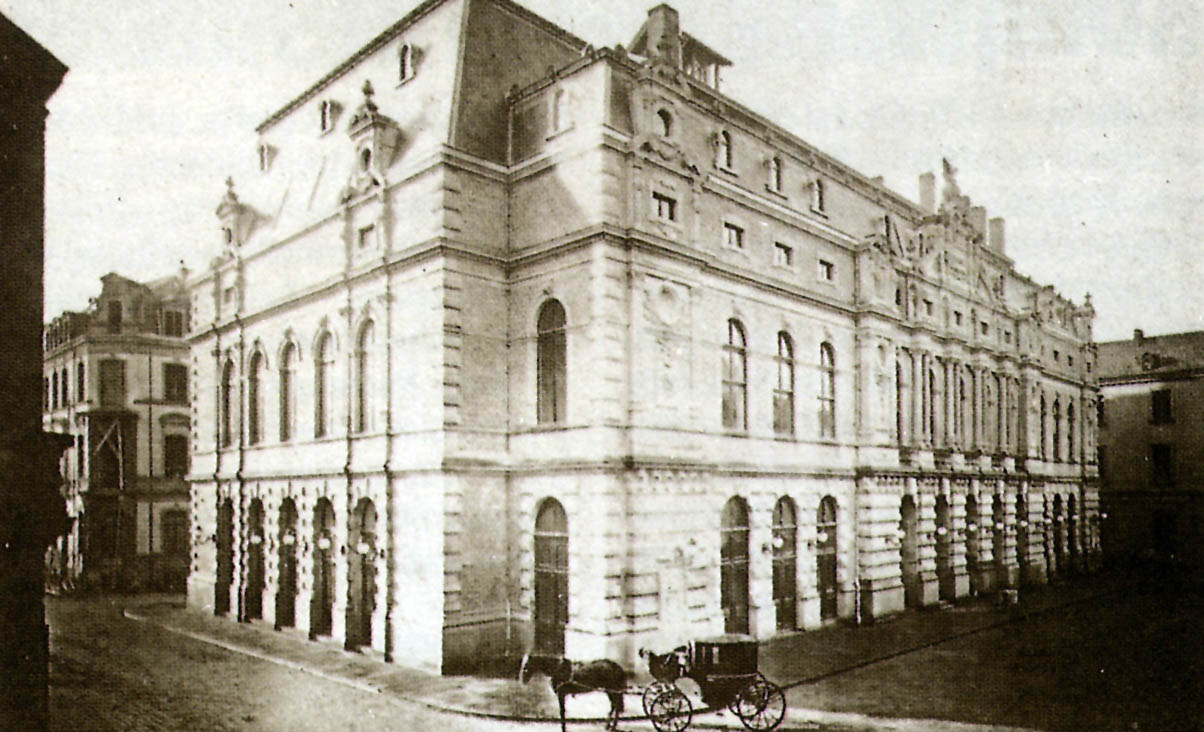
Theater at the Glockengasse ca. 1872

After laying the foundation stone on 15 June 1870 at Glockengasse No. 17-23, the municipal theatre designed by the Cologne city architect Julius Carl Raschdorff opened its doors on 1 September 1872 with Weber's Der Freischütz on a built-up area of 1633 m^{2} with over 1800 seats. The construction costs of the 53.35 metre long, 30.76 metre wide and 15.70 metre high building in the style of the German Renaissance amounted to 700000 marks. The northern long side, facing Glockengasse, was divided into a central building and two side porches extending to the east and west. Johannes Böhm received the concession to operate the theatre on 10 February 1873, which marked the beginning of a new era in Cologne theatre. Here opera, operetta, drama and ballet were now to find their place. Heinrich Behr, the theatre's first director and himself an opera singer, had Lessing's play Minna von Barnhelm performed at the opening. The director in 1905 was Max Martersteig. The house lasted until its destruction by bombing in the Second World War on 29 June 1943. The city appropriated the rubble site in 1943.

== Smaller theatres ==
After the trade regulations in Prussia in June 1869 also brought about a liberalisation of the theatre business, several smaller theatres opened in Cologne, specialising in certain theatre genres alongside the large theatres. Franz Stollwerck built a "concert theatre and cafe house" in 1844 that could seat 3,000 people, but it burned down as early as March 1849. He had already unknowingly arranged for a successor building at Schildergasse 49 in December 1847, whose ballroom was first called "Vaudeville Theatre", then "Thalia Theatre", and from 1882 "Wilhelm Theatre". His "Königshalle", built in 1856 in the outlying Bayenstraße 29/31, with 2400 seats, functioned as a theatre, concert hall and ballroom. On 24 September 1863, the city of Cologne rejected an offer to purchase the building, which was then converted into a candy factory.

The Gertrudenhof (nickname Geistersterz) had belonged to circus director Oscar Carré since November 1859 and was a varieté acquired in 1875 by the Lese, a society of national liberal sentiment. It burned down on 25 August 1878. After Carré was able to acquire further neighbouring properties, he still had a permanent circus built in 1878 by master builder Heinrich Nagelschmidt under the name "Circus Carré". In 1886, it became the "Reichshallen und Operetten Theater" at Getrudenstraße 10; it was the third largest theatre in Cologne after the opera house and the theatre. Peter Wilhelm Millowitsch moved his puppet theatre to the Reichshallen Theatre and launched today's Volkstheater with a grand opening event on 10 May 1895 with "Journey Around the Earth in 80 Days" by Jules Verne in Colognian. The Getrudenhof on Neumarkt opened in September 1869, owned by Manuel Mosler. The "Victoria-Theater" at Riehler Türmchen 1 was a summer theatre until 1867, after its demolition the "Actien-Theater" opened on 21 April 1867 between Flora Botanical Garden and the Cologne Zoological Garden (Frohngasse) as a summer theatre. It served as an alternative theatre for the burnt-down Schauspielhaus, but burnt down completely three months later on 9 May 1869. The "Tivoli Theatre", built in 1870, met the same fate on 22 June 1874. In order to keep the theatre going, performances continued in the "Thalia-Theater" and the Gertrudenhof, but this too burned down on 25. August 1878. In May 1868, the "Flora Summer Theatre" opened with 1200 seats (until 1908). The Actien- und Flora-Theater hosted world premieres of Jacques Offenbach's works. As one of the last large private theatres, the "Wilhelmtheater" was demolished on Schildergasse in 1888. For Cologne's citizens, going to the theatre was one of the most popular leisure pursuits in the late 19th century. The Varieté Theatre Groß-Köln opened in 1912 in Friesenstraße 44–46, it had a séparée with the "Bonbonniere". After the destruction of the war, the Sartory-Säle were built here in 1948.

== Cologne's first opera on the Habsburg Ring ==
After the large-scale incorporations, there was no doubt in the city council about the need for another stage house. In May 1898, it was decided to build a new building on the Habsburger Ring on the site between Aachener Straße and Richard-Wagner-Straße. The architectural competition was won by Carl Moritz, who worked in Cologne as a city building inspector at the municipal structural engineering office. His design resulted in a building with a restaurant and garden terrace in the Neo-Baroque style. Completed in 1902, the building had 1800 seats and cost 3.9 million German gold marks to build. Cologne now had two large theatres, which were first known as the "Vereinigte Stadttheater", and from the season 1906/1907 as the opera house and the playhouse, but were run jointly. The new theatre now mainly performed opera and drama, the "old" house in Glockengasse plays and operettas. Julius Hofmann, the director of the Schauspielhaus, took over the running of both houses. Since theatres were now considered lucrative enterprises, Hofmann initially took over the management as a tenant on his own account. However, as both theatres soon became less popular due to the emergence of new entertainment venues such as vaudeville theatres and cinemas, the municipal theatres were subsidised from 1905 onwards.

On 27 November 1926, one of the most important works of the first half of the 20th century, Béla Bartók's ballet pantomime The Miraculous Mandarin, was premiered at the Habsburg Ring Opera House. The piece caused a theatre scandal and the then Lord Mayor Konrad Adenauer banned further performances.

The opera house was heavily damaged by bombing during the Second World War, on 22 November 1943 and 14 May 1944 respectively. and was demolished in 1958. The provisional venue was then the auditorium of the municipal University.

== Present situation ==
The Schauspielhaus and the Opera were not rebuilt. In the meantime, the number of municipal theatres has continued to grow. The Bühnen der Stadt Köln (Stages of the City of Cologne) combine all the municipal performance venues for drama, ballet and theatre, etc. In addition, the interested visitor will find a large number of private cabaret theatres with a wide-ranging and also sophisticated repertoire.
