= Ondřej Kyas =

Czech composer and musician

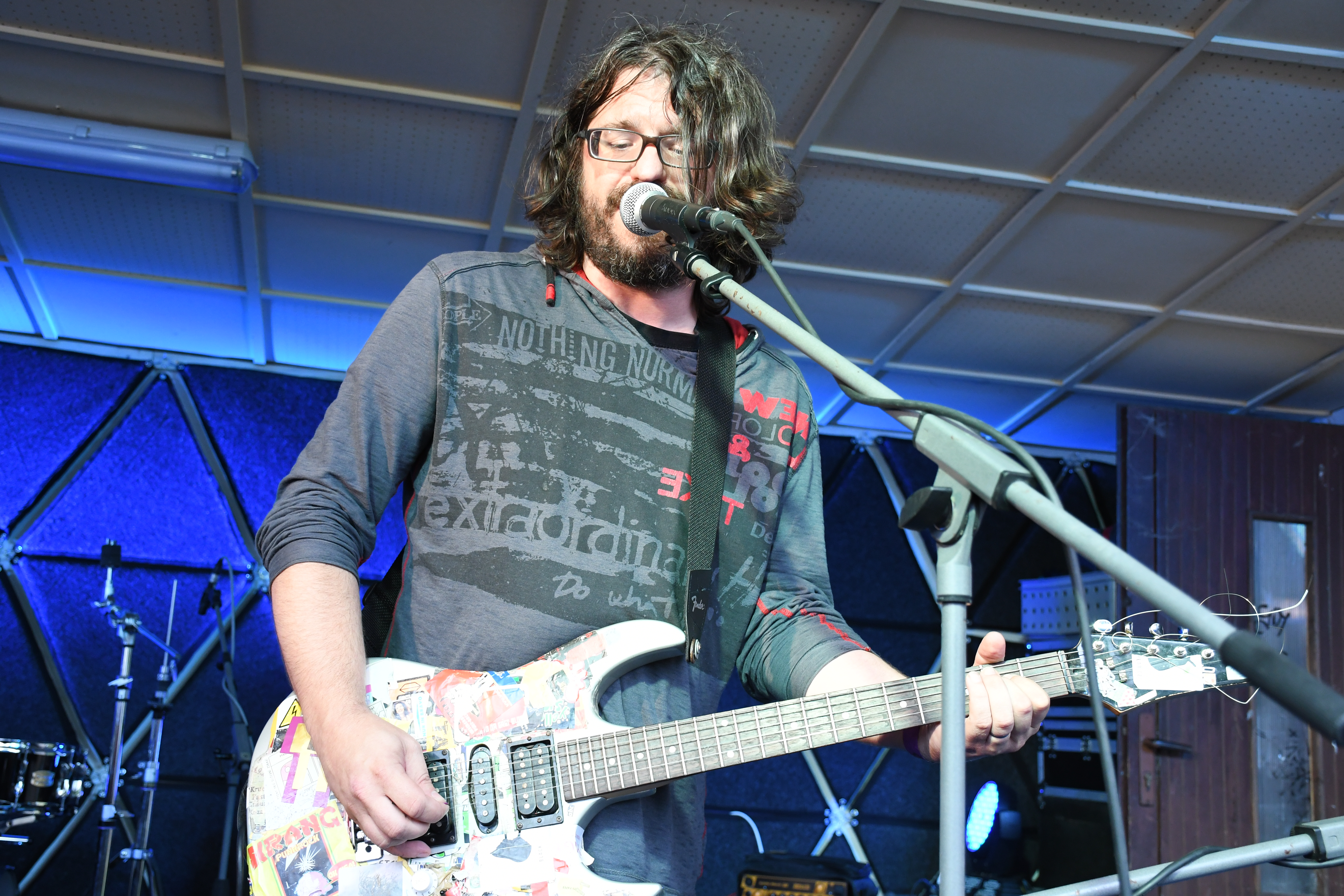
Ondřej Kyas

Ondřej Kyas (born 14 April 1979 Boskovice) is a Czech composer and musician.

== Musical activities ==
Kyas majored in Czech and Musicology at Masaryk University, Brno, Czech Republic. He is a co-founder and composer of the Ensemble Opera Diversa. Kyas has written five full-length operas in Czech, Pickelhering 1607 aneb Nový Orfeus z Bohemie (lit. 'Pickelhering 1607 or The New Orpheus of Bohemia', 2007), Společná smrt milenců v Šinagawě (lit. 'The Strange Suicide of Two Lovers in Shinagawa', 2009), Dýňový démon ve vegetariánské restauraci (lit. 'The Pumpkin Demon in a Vegetarian Restaurant', 2010), Ponava (Zmizelé řeky) (lit. 'Ponava: The Lost Rivers', 2013) and Čaroděj a jeho sluha (lit. 'The Conjuror and His Slave', 2016), as well as numerous shorter pieces.

== Major works ==
=== Operas for the Ensemble Opera Diversa on Pavel Drábek's librettos ===
- Pickelhering 1607 aneb Nový Orfeus z Bohemie (lit. 'Pickelhering 1607 or The New Orpheus of Bohemia', 2007), a comic chamber opera (100') for nine singers and an eighteen-piece orchestra.
- Společná smrt milenců v Šinagawě (lit. 'The Strange Suicide of Two Lovers in Shinagawa', 2009), a half-evening poetic opera (65') for 5 singers and a 10-piece orchestra
- Dýňový démon ve vegetariánské restauraci (lit. 'The Pumpkin Demon in a Vegetarian Restaurant', 2010), a gastronomical Gesamtkunstwerk for 4 solos, a Lucifer, a small kitchen chorus and a chamber orchestra (of 7)
- Ponava (Zmizelé řeky) (lit. 'Ponava: The Lost Rivers', 2013), a poetic opera about the mysterious rivers under our feet
- Čaroděj a jeho sluha (lit. 'The Conjuror and His Slave', 2016), a horror fairytale opera about serving in hell

=== A Musical ===
- Na dno (lit. 'To the Very Bottom', 2015), a chamber musical for a graduating year at the JAMU (Janáček Academy of Music and Performing Arts)

=== Plays with Songs and Other Collaborations with Pavel Drábek ===
- Everyman čili Kdokoli (2013), a radio play by Pavel Drábek with Ondřej Kyas's songs, an adaptation of the late medieval morality play Everyman, commissioned and produced by the Czech Radio 3 Vltava (premiere broadcast on 23 April 2013; directed Hana Mikulášková, dramaturgy Hana Hložková). It also has an adapted stage version play for the Ensemble Opera Diversa, directed by Tomáš Studený (premiere in August 2013)
- Leviatan (lit. 'Leviathan', 2014), a play by Pavel Drábek, Lizzy Steel (McEllan) and Mark McLaughlin (McEllan) with Ondřej Kyas's songs, inspired by the short stories of Joseph Roth, produced by the Ensemble Opera Diversa, directed by Tomáš Studený (premiere in December 2014)
- Nissenův korál (lit. 'Nissen's Jewel', 2016), a radio play by Pavel Drábek with songs by Kyas, based on the stage play Leviatan, commissioned and produced by the Czech Radio 3 Vltava (premiere broadcast in September 2016; directed Hana Mikulášková, dramaturgy Hana Hložková)
- Princ Mucedorus a princezna Amadina (lit. 'Prince Mucedorus and Princess Amadina', 2017), an original radio play by Pavel Drábek with Kyas' music, based on the anonymous Elizabethan play Mucedorus (1598); commissioned and produced by the Czech Radio 2 Dvojka (premiere broadcast on 22 October 2017; directed by Lukáš Kopecký, dramaturgy Hana Hložková)

=== Instrumental compositions ===
- 3 string quartets
- 2 masses: 1. "rhythmic" (for mixed chorus, solos, organ, electric guitar, bass guitar and drums), 2. "sine Gloria" (for mixed chorus and organ)
- Magnificat (I) for pro solos, mixed chorus and string trio
- Magnificat (II, 2012) for mixed chorus and string orchestra; premiere recording available on YouTube
- Visions for 2 string quartets
- A triple concerto for flute, clarinet, bassoon and string orchestra (2006)
- Prázdné ulice (Empty Streets, 2008), a fantasy for string orchestra, inspired by Michal Ajvaz's eponymous novel
- Melodie (2009) for string orchestra
- Stabat mater (2010) for solos, two choruses and a chamber orchestra
- " Chamber Symphony No. 1" (2011) for string orchestra and three solo musicians
- Strange Kind of Happiness (2012) for piano quintet, commissioned by the Ensemble 10/10 (premiered by the Ensemble 10/10 on 15 June 2012 in Liverpool)

== Orchestrations ==
- Pavel Haas, Suite for Oboe and Piano, arranged for oboe and string orchestra (2015)
- Leoš Janáček, Šárka (1887 version) in a full instrumentation for chamber orchestra (2018)
- Pavel Haas, Šarlatán (The Charlatan, 1937, an opera), an instrumentation for chamber orchestra (2019)

== Discography ==
- Syntezátor ve dnech kdy spím (2016)
