= Georg Ackermann =

Georg Ackermann may refer to:

- Georg Ackermann (athlete) (born 1972), retired German long jumper
- Georg Ackermann (pilot) (1918–2007), German Luftwaffe bomber pilot
- Georg Christian Benedict Ackermann (1763–1833), German theologian
- Georg Friedrich Ackermann (1780–1853), German landscape painter

== See also ==
- George W. Ackerman (1884–1962), American government photographer
- Ackermann (surname)
