= Adam Christoph Schüler =

Adam Christoph Schüler (born August 8, 1640 in Weißenfels; died after 1693; also Schüller and Schiller, sometimes read as Schaber, Stüber, and Schider) was a German actor, playwright, and theater writer.

Adam Christoph Schüler was the son of Heinrich Schüler, a Stadtrichter (city judge) in Weißenfels. In 1660 he began his studies in Leipzig. He likely soon joined a traveling troupe that performed at the Leipzig Fair. Adam worked as an actor and playwright with several important theater directors, such as Jakob Kuhlmann, Andreas Elenson, and Johannes Velten. His theatrical manuscripts, Ein verliebter Verdruß (an adaptation of Molière's Le Dépit amoureux), and Der durchlauchtige Kohlenbrenner, are included in Codex Ia 38589 (Wienbibliothek). Der durchlauchtige Kohlenbrenner may have been based on an English or Spanish source and was also performed by the theater troupe of Michael Daniel Treu.
