= Touring theatre =

Theatre ensemble not resident in a certain building

A touring theatre company travels to different locations to perform plays and musicals. Touring theater refers to a dynamic form of theatrical performance by its presentation in various location instead of a fixed playhouse.

== History ==
The concept of touring theaters, which means performing a show regardless to a fixed location, has roots to very origin of dramas. In the ancient times and before the establishment of playhouses, performers usually travel around to share their arts with different communities.

Touring theaters plays a critical role in developing of artistic landscapes by reaching audiences that lack access to live performances and dramatic arts.

=== Origin and Early forms ===
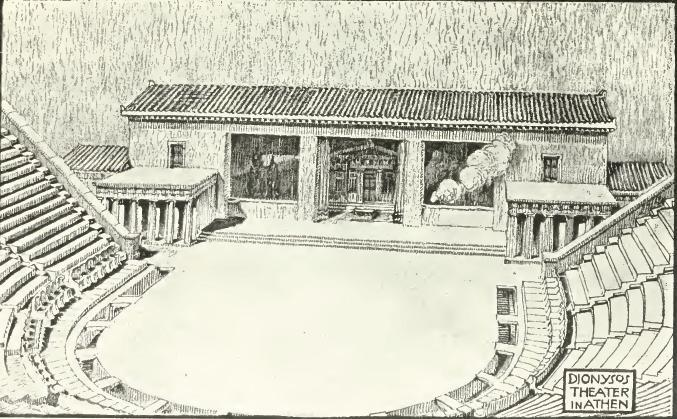
Reconstruction of the Theatre of Dionysus, Athens

Evidences suggests the presence of travelling performers and theatrical performances in ancient Greece. For example the vibrant theatrical culture of Athens, specially its festivals honoring Dionysus, have significant relationship with travelling performers and theatrical performances. Various town held these festivals in various days, which this allowed travelling companies to travel and perform in different cities.

==== Roman Mimes ====
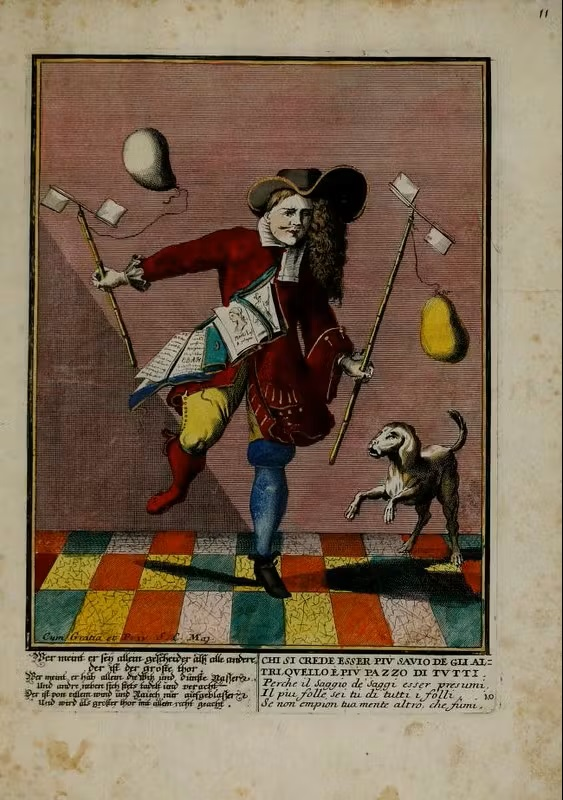
A roman mime from an Italian book of proverbs made by the engraver and painter Giuseppe Maria Mitelli (1634–1718).

A clearer picture of travelling performers emerges from roman mimes. Mimes was very popular in roman society and they featuring both male and female actors who performed in variety of settings. Greek tragedy and comedies was much formal and text-based traditions but, roman mimes unlike the Greeks, focused on everyday life and used music and songs along the gestures and movement which they performed.

=== Commedia dell'arte ===
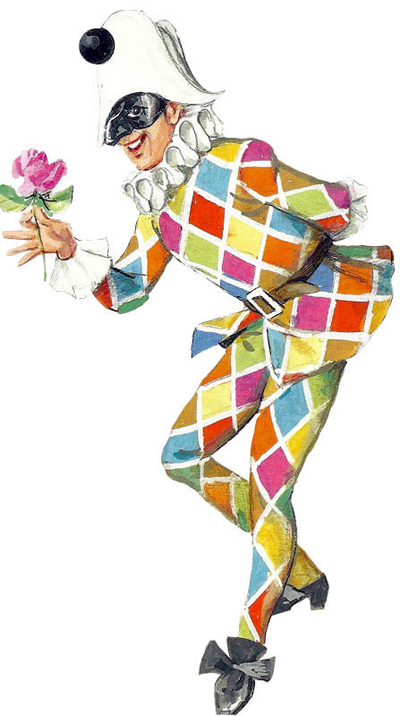
Harlequin in a 19th-century Italian print.

Commedia dell'arte translates to "play of professional artists". Origin of commedia dell'arte is from Italy. Commedia dell'arte play and important role in formalization of theatrical practice in Europe from the 16th through the 18th century. This theatrical form distinguished itself from amateur dramatics through its organized structure. Commedia dell'arte usually contained around 10 performers of men and women and was a family business. In their businesses, they traveled town to town and performed variety of spaces ranging from public squares to royal courts.

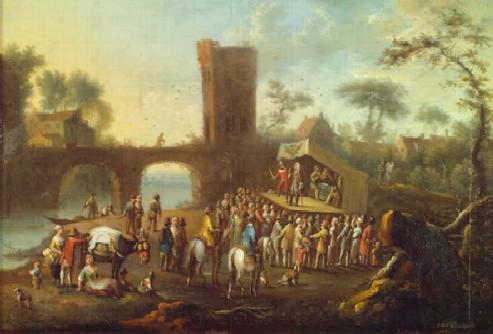
German Wanderbühne, which is another significant form of touring theater from the 17th to the 19th century.

This form of performance had a huge impact on European theater. Commedia dell'arte by introducing professional actors to the stage, done a revolutionary development on its time. The new techniques and professional characteristics of commedia dell'arte heavily influenced great playwrights such as William Shakespeare in England and Moliere in France, who used elements of commedia into their works. The professional organization of these touring companies and their innovative performance style established a significant tool for the development of theater as a profession and a popular form of entertainment across the Europe.

=== Federal Theater Project ===
In the United States, a significant example of organized touring theater with a historical impact is the Federal Theater Project (FTP), which operates from 1935 to 1939. This project was a part of President Franklin Delano Roosevelt's New Deal during the Great Depression. The primary goal of the Federal Theater Project was to provide employment opportunities for thousands of unemployed theater professionals at the time of the Great Depression. However, under the leadership of national director Hallie Flanagan, the Federal Theater Project also aimed to create a national theater, foster regional theater development, and make live theater accessible to millions of Americans. Because of economical hardship of Americans at the time of the Great Depression and the lack of established play houses in many parts of the United States, touring became a crucial component of the Federal Theater Project's mission to reach a nationwide audience.

The Federal Theater Project provide a diverse range of performances. This diverse range of performances included classical dramas by playwrights like Shakespeare, modern plays, children's theater, vaudeville acts, musical comedies, and innovative forms like the "Living Newspaper," which addressed contemporary social and political issues.

==== Real-Time Examples ====
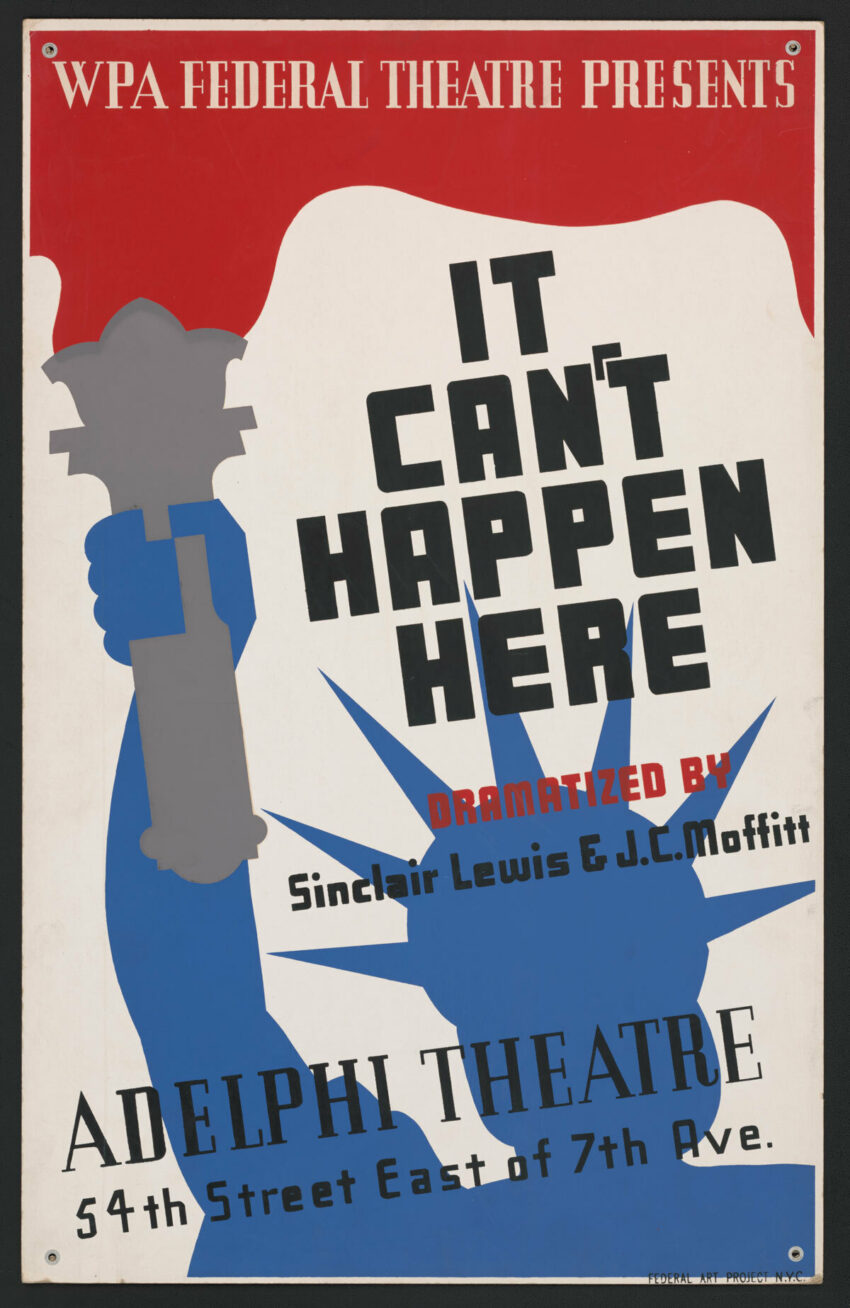
The Federal Theatre’s adaptation of Sinclair Lewis’s It Can’t Happen Here was seen by nearly 400,000 Americans. Library of Congress, Prints & Photographs Division, WPA Poster Collection

To serve a wide geographical area, the Federal Theater Project organized touring circuits that reached rural areas and communities where dramatic productions were infrequently seen. For instance, companies from Chicago and Peoria toured Wisconsin and Illinois, a Detroit-based unit performed in other parts of Michigan, and the Cincinnati unit covered Ohio, Kentucky, and West Virginia. The scale of the Federal Theater Project's touring efforts was huge. The Federal Theater Project staged over a thousand production, between 1935 and 1939 in 29 to 40 states, reaching an estimated audience of 20 to 30 million people, which many of them was experiencing live theater for the first time. The Harlem Macbeth, a groundbreaking all-Black production, toured nationally, even reaching the Jim Crow South and being seen by approximately 120,000 people.

The Federal Theater Project's impact on American theater was significant. It democratized access to the arts, provided invaluable opportunities for thousands of theater artists, and fostered experimentation with new theatrical forms and techniques. Despite its relatively short existence, the Federal Theater Project left a lasting legacy, demonstrating the potential for government support of the arts and the power of theater to engage with social and political issues on a national scale.

=== Contemporary Examples ===
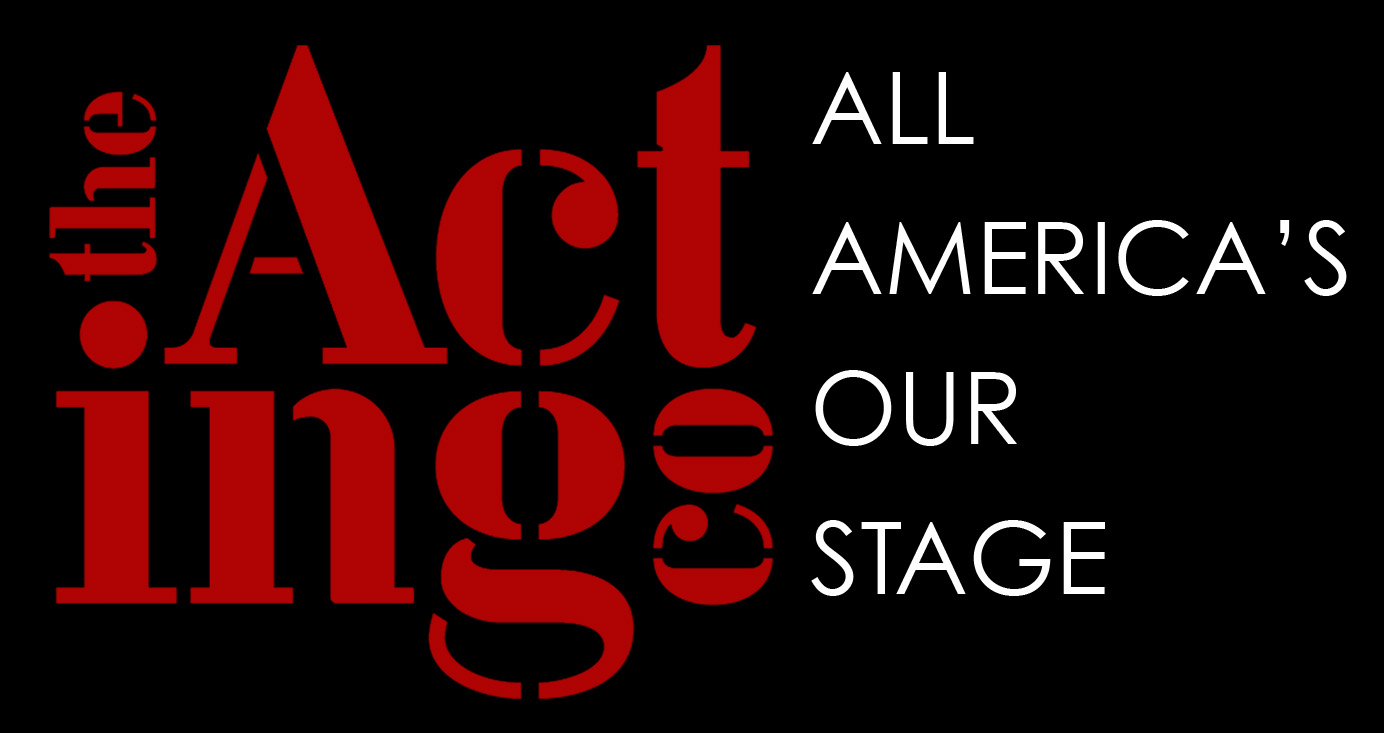
The Acting Company (TAC) logo with tagline.

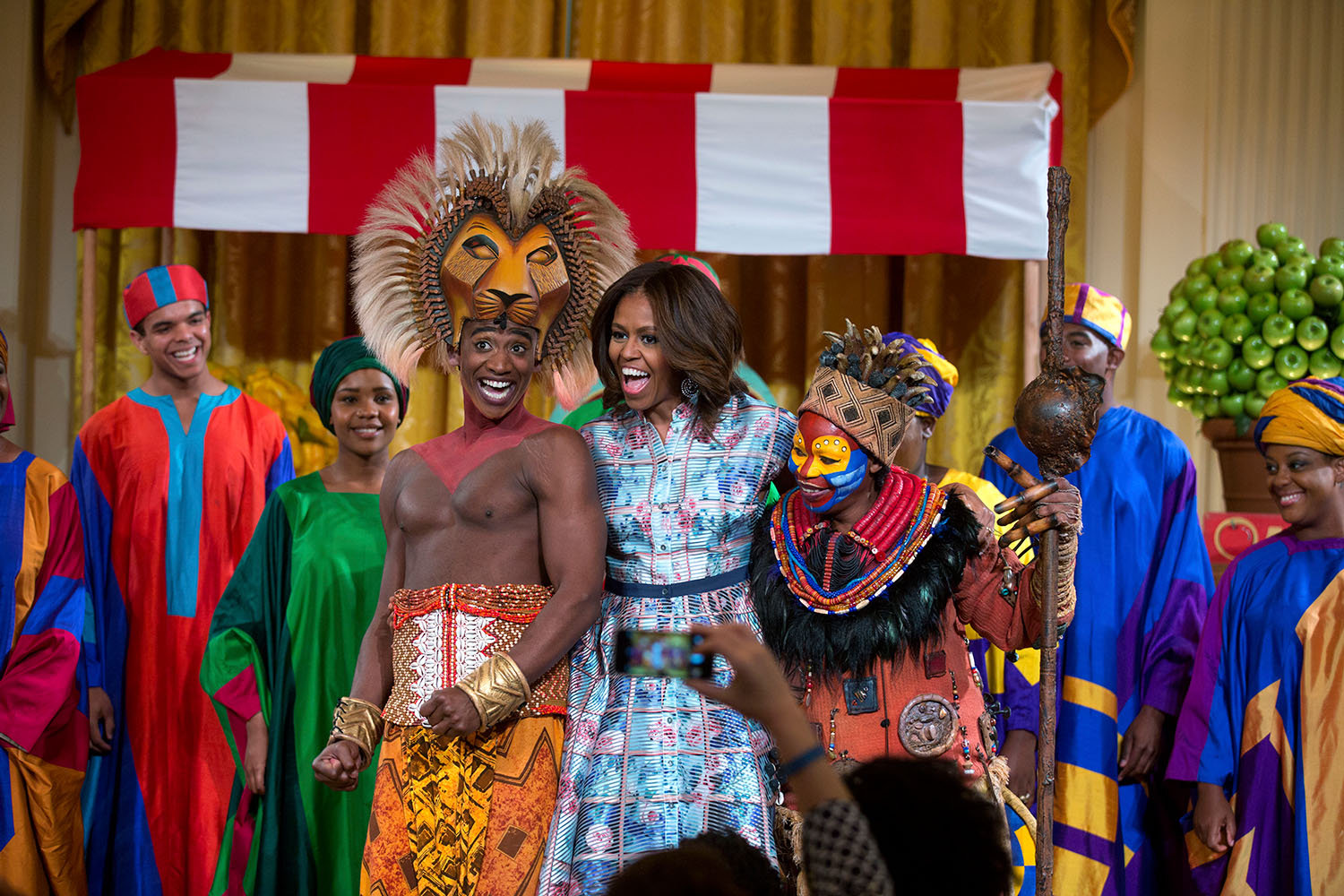
First Lady Michelle Obama joins the cast of the U.S. touring company onstage after their performance at the Kids' State Dinner in the East Room of the White House.

In the United States, numerous companies specialize in touring productions. For example, the Acting Company, is a renowned touring repertory company that has been bringing high-quality classical performances to audiences nationally and internationally since 1972. Other companies, such as Birmingham Children's Theatre and Theatreworks USA, focus on theater for young audiences, reaching millions of students each year. The Nebraska Theatre Caravan is best known for its annual tour of A Christmas Carol, which has reached hundreds of cities across the US and Canada. Additionally, major Broadway and West End productions frequently embark on extensive national and international tours, bringing popular musicals like Pretty Woman: The Musical, Hamilton, The Lion King, and Wicked to audiences worldwide.

== Finance ==
A touring theatre is produced by a theater company, called the producing entity, often based in one location, and sold, as a show, by a booking agent to presenters. The presenters are responsible for arranging the venue, local crew, and any other considerations needed and specified in the rider. The presenter pays a set amount of money to the producing entity, and the producing entity then pays the traveling crew by check or direct deposit. The show could be in for one performance on one day, or for a "sit" of a week or longer. Extended engagements can last six weeks or more.

Touring theatre companies can provide steady work for performers. However, it can also mean that they are away from home for an extended period of time. While touring allowances may be available, performers may find that they are not enough to cover expenses for accommodations and eating out.

== Operation ==
The Arts League of Service traveling (touring) theater group 1919-1937 with their touring vehicle from 1922.

The contract between the presenter and the producing entity often includes stipulations on force majeure, labor actions, and schedule of compensations and when each payment is due. It can be split between a pre-performance fee, and a fee paid on the day of the performance, once complete. The contract will often stipulate the venue, venue contact information, and technical contacts. Also, the contract may state a minimum stage size, in order to ensure that the production will occur as envisioned. As with any contract, negotiations are possible, and can mean modifications to the set, staging, or responsibilities to the Presenter.

== Legalities ==
Riders proscribe the needed support the touring company requires. They include, but are not limited to, local crew staffing, dressing room access, equipment to be provided by the presenter, minimum turn around time between shows, meals, lodging, parking, and loading dock requirements. The rider is a legal document that is part of the agreement with the presenter and is treated as part of the contract. Hotel accommodation is typically a room per person, although some companies operate on double occupancy, though union or contractual agreements with performers may prohibit this.
