= Elisabet Spiegelberg =

German actress and theater director

Elisabet Spiegelberg, also called Denner-Spiegelberg, née Denner (Nuremberg 1681 – Hamburg, 1757), was a German actress and theater director. She was one of the first actresses to become famous in Scandinavia, and later became the leader of one of the most known theater companies touring in Scandinavia prior to the establishment of a local theater there.

== Life ==
Elisabet Spiegelberg was the daughter of the German actor known as Denner the Elder and sister of the Harlequin actor known as Denner the Younger. The whole family was engaged at the famous Velthen Company, who often toured Scandinavia in Denmark, Sweden and Norway from at least the late 1690s onward. The company were pioneers in these countries were there was yet no local theaters: the Velthen Company became famous in Scandinavia, and Elisabet Denner became the perhaps first actress famous among the Scandinavian public, known particularly for her role as Eve in Der Gefallene Mensch, and she is described as the leading lady of the company.

In 1710, she married her colleague Johann Christian Spiegelberg, who formed his own company and where she continued as its leading lady. The Speigelberg Company succeeded the Velthens company as the perhaps most famed in Denmark, Norway and Sweden: they are known to have toured Denmark 1718-19 and Norway 1732-33. After the death of her spouse in 1732 Elisabet Spiegelberg took over the leadership of the company, and are known to have toured the Swedish cities: she is mentioned in Norrköping in 1735 and Gothenburg in 1737.

In 1740, she dissolved her company and returned to Germany, where she was engaged at the Schöneman Company in Lüneburg until her death.
