= Otto Ackermann =

Otto Ackermann may refer to:

- Otto Ackermann (painter) (1872–1953), German painter
- Otto Ackermann (conductor) (1909–1960), Romanian conductor

== See also ==
- Ackermann (surname)
