= Dorothea Ackermann =

German actress (1752–1821)

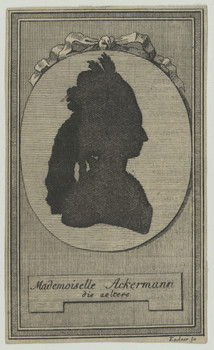
- Born: February 12, 1752; Danzig
- Died: October 21, 1821 (aged 69); Rellingen
- Occupation: Actor

Caroline Dorothea Elisabeth Ackermann (12 February 1752 – 21 October 1821) was a German actress and eldest daughter of Konrad Ackermann and Sophie Charlotte Bierreichel. She had one sister, Charlotte Ackermann, and one stepbrother Friedrich Ludwig Schröder via her mother.

Born in Gdańsk (Danzig), Royal Prussia, she entered the stage at the age of four in the role of Annabella in Lessing's Miss Sara Sampson. She was most active between 1769 and 1778 with roles include Orsina, Minna von Barnhelm, and Marie in Götz von Berlichingen, as well as Ophelia in Hamlet which was very well received.

She left the stage in 1778 and married Johann Christoph Unzer, who was a noted doctor and poet in Altona. After her marriage, she stopped appearing on the stage and chose instead to take part in upper-class urban life, which she could only now do as the wife of a renowned doctor. The marriage ended in 1796 with an ugly divorce. Her stepbrother acquired and destroyed all of the court documents that Unzer had allowed to be created.

From 1797 until her death in 1821, Ackermann lived with her stepbrother at his home in Rellingen.
