= Johann Michael Böck =

German actor (1743–1793)

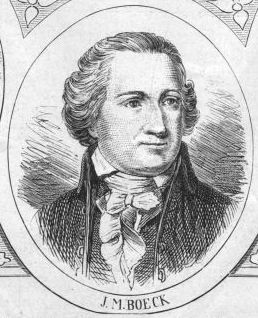
Johann Michael Boeck

Johann Michael Böck or Boeck (1743 – July 18, 1793) was a German actor.

Böck first worked as a barber. In 1762 he moved to Mainz, where he joined Konrad Ernst Ackermann's theatre company (the Ackermannschen Gesellschaft) and traveled with them to Hamburg. He then joined Abel Seyler's company (the Seylerschen Gesellschaft), until 1775 when he found steady employment at the court theatre (Hoftheater) in Gotha, then under the direction of Konrad Ekhof. In 1777 he made a tour of appearances around Germany, and in 1778 after the death of Ekhof, led the Gotha Hoftheater for a year, until its dissolution in 1779. That year he moved to the newly opened Nationaltheater Mannheim, where he was the lead actor, playing Karl Moor in the controversial 1782 premiere of Friedrich Schiller's Die Räuber, as well as the eponymous character in Schiller's Fiesco. He died in Mannheim on July 18, 1793.
