= Friederike von Alvensleben =

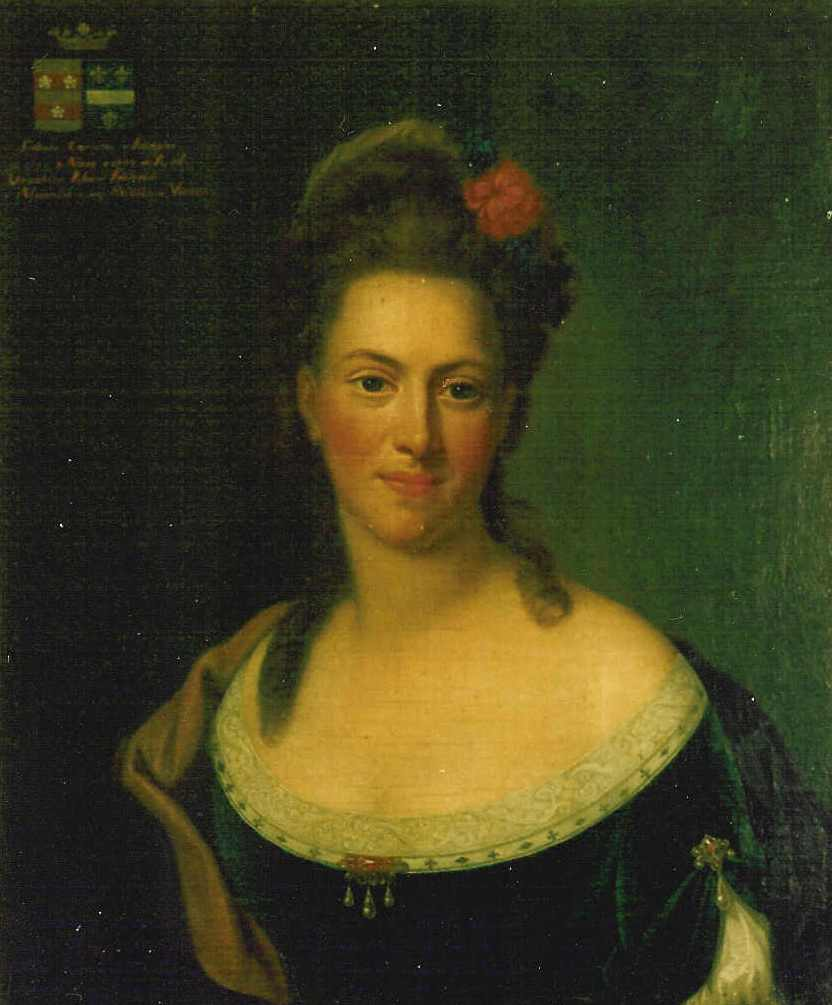
Friederike von Alvensleben

Friederike von Alvensleben (1749-1799), was a German actress and theater director. She was the managing director of a notable theater company, which was famous in Northern Germany during the second half of the 18th century. She was first married to Karl Theophil Döbbelin and then to Johann Friedrich von Alvensleben (1736-1819).
