= Karl Theophil Döbbelin =

German theatre director and actor (1727–1793)

Karl Gottlieb Döbbelin (Karl Theophilus Döbbelin, also Carl Theophil Döbbelin as well as Doebelin or Döbelin (27 February 1727 – 10 December 1793) was a German theatre director and actor.

== Life ==
Born in Königsberg in der Neumark, Döbbelin studied law at the Martin Luther University of Halle-Wittenberg, where he had to flee early without a degree because of involvement in a tumult, and joined the society of Friederike Caroline Neuber in 1750. After years with wandering troupes of actors, he founded his own troupe, and had to give it up after a short time. Also a second society, which he formed in 1757 and with which he played in the Rhine area, disbanded after one year.

After that, Döbbelin was a member of the Ackermannsche Gesellschaft until 1766 and then went to Berlin to the director Franz Schuch der Ältere, whom he helped to abolish the Stegreiftheater comedy. Döbbelin separated from him in 1767 and founded a third company, with which he travelled through several Prussian provinces and brought Lessing's Minna von Barnhelm to success in Berlin in 1768. At the Opernhaus am Hagenmarkt in Braunschweig Lessing's Emilia Galotti was premiered under his direction in 1772.

After the death of Heinrich Gottfried Koch, he was granted the privilege for Berlin. In 1775, he opened his own Döbbelinsches Theater in the Behrenstraße, which became a permanent stage from that time on. In the autumn of 1777, Johann André followed a call from Döbbelin to become music director of the Döbbelinisches Orchester. He developed an extensive activity as a composer of Singspiele and conducted his own and foreign works. His successor in 1784 became Johann Christian Frischmuth until his death in 1790 - from 1788 with Karl Bernhard Wessely.

The Döbbelin's stage was the venue for many theatre-historically significant performances. The guest performance of the Hamburg actor Johann Franz Brockmann in December 1777 deserves special mention: Brockmann played Hamlet in Shakespeare's play of the same name on 12 evenings in front of a sold-out audience. Shakespeare's Othello was first performed in Berlin on 29 April 1775 in a translation by Johann Joachim Eschenburg. Döbbelin himself appeared in the title role. Döbbelin's passion for Shakespeare was inspired by Lessing of which Daniel Chodowiecki produced a series of pictures. In 1783, the first performance of Lessing's Nathan the Wise took place here, in which Döbbelin also embodied the first Nathan. On 8 March 1784, there was also the Berlin premiere of Schiller's Die Verschwörung des Fiesco zu Genua, edited by Karl Martin Plümicke. Döbbelin himself appeared in the role of Andrea Doria, Duke of Genoa, while Leonore, the wife of the Fiesco, was played by his daughter Caroline.

After the closure of the Döbbelin's Theatre on 3 December 1786, the German actors were assigned by order of the King to the vacant French Comedy House on the Gendarmenmarkt, which the King Frederick William II of Prussia elevated to the status of "Royal National Theatre". It was opened on 5 December 1787 with a speech "composed and spoken" by Döbbelin. On 2 January 1787 the Fiesko was performed again under the direction of Döbbelin, but after a dispute with him, the theatre was placed under royal administration. It was closed on 31 December 1801 and a new building was constructed.

As a theatre director, Döbbelin strove for a purified stage and knew how to attract the best forces such as Ferdinand Fleck, Joseph Anton Christ, Margarete Schick and others. As an actor, he was especially liked in typical roles, but his main merit is seen in the assertion of the German drama at a time when almost exclusively works by French and Italian authors were performed in the original language.

His first wife was Maximiliana Christiana Döbbelin (?-1759), Friederike von Alvensleben's second daughter (1739–1793), who played the female leading roles in his companies with great success. When Döbbelin was arrested in Leipzig 1774 because of gambling debts, she did not release him, but went into business for herself with some actors and went to Dresden, where she also met the courtly society. After his release, she went with him to Berlin and Potsdam, where she gave Minna and Emilia. in addition, Goethe's Clavigo and Die Lügner by Carlo Goldoni were also performed. In 1775, Friederike Caroline gave birth to a son August by her lover, the chamberlain Johann Friedrich von Alvensleben, whom she married after her divorce in September 1776. Döbbelin then married Regine Elenson in third marriage

Among his children were the actors:

- Caroline Maximiliane Döbbelin (1758–1828)
- Conrad Carl Casimir Döbbelin (1763–1821)
- Conrad Carl Theodor Ernst Döbbelin (1799–1856)
- Auguste Döbbelin (1803–1842), Ziehtochter Friederike Carolines und Ehefrau von Conrad Carl Theodor Ernst Döbbelin

Döbbelin died at the age of 66.
