= Eleonora Constantia Ulich =

Actor and theater manager

Eleonora Constantia Ulich (fl. 1737), was a German stage actress and theater actor-manager director. She was married to the German actor-manager Johann August Ulich and engaged as an actor in his theater company, the Hochteutsche Comoedianten. She acted as the manager and director of the Hochteutsche Comoedianten after the death of her spouse in 1710.

== Life and career ==
Eleonora Constantia Ulich was married to the German actor-manager Johann August Ulich (died 1710). Her husband was the manager of the German theater company Hochteutsche Comoedianten. It was an internationally successful theater of its time and known for the role it played in Scandinavian theater history. Aside from its activity in the Holy Roman Empire, the Hochteutsche Comoedianten often toured the Nordic countries, which did not yet have an indigenous theater at this time period, and it visited Sweden in 1696–1697, Gothenburg and Copenhagen in 1705.

Eleonora Constantia Ulich was engaged in the theater of her husband as actress. When her husband died in 1710, she took over the managing role of the theater. During her successful tenure as managing director, the Hochteutsche Comoedianten maintained a leading role in Scandinavian theater, where it was a leading force alongside its rival, the Velthen Company. She led the theater to Trelleborg in 1716, to Bergen in 1733 and Oslo 1736–1737.

== See also ==
- Catharina Elisabeth Velten
