= Josef Ackermann (disambiguation) =

Josef Ackermann (born 1948) is a Swiss banker and former chief executive officer of Deutsche Bank.

Josef Ackermann may also refer to:

- Josef Ackermann (journalist) (1896–1959), German journalist
- Josef Ackermann (politician) (1905–1997), German politician and a representative of the Reichstag for the Nazi Party (NSDAP)
