= Marie Magdalene Charlotte Ackermann =

Marie Ackermann
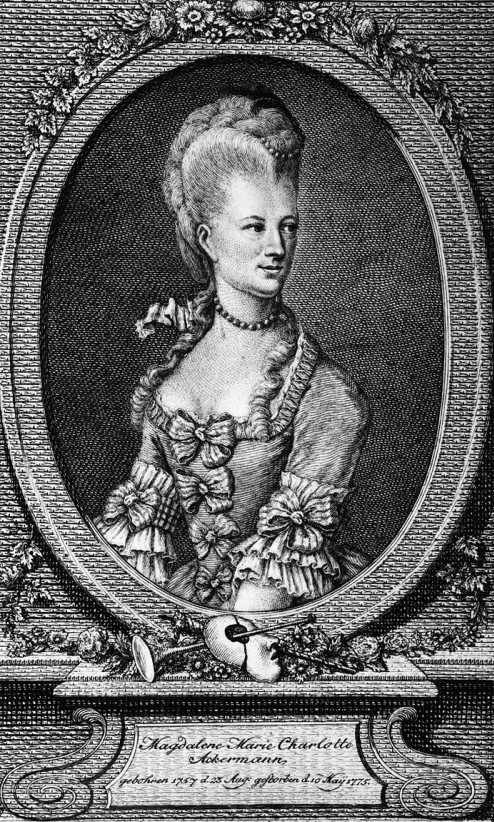
- Born: 23 August 1757
- Died: 10 May 1775 (aged 17)
- Parents: Konrad Ackermann; Sophie Bierreichel

Marie Magdalene Charlotte Ackermann (23 August 1757 – 10 May 1775) was a German actress. She was the daughter of the actors Konrad Ernst Ackermann and Sophie Charlotte Ackermann.

== Biography ==
Marie Magdalene Charlotte Ackermann made her the stage debut on 16 October 1761 as Louise in Molière's Malade Imaginaire. She toured in Northern Germany. She was also initially active as a dancer, but concentrated more on her acting career. From 1765, she performed in Hamburg, where she became very popular. She died at the age of 17 in 1775. Her body were kept at lite-de-parade to give people the opportunity to say goodbye. Four thousand admirers followed her coffin at her funeral, and the theatre was draped in black morning. She was the sister of Dorothea Ackermann.

== In literature ==
She became the heroine of the novel Charlotte Ackermann by Otto Müller.
