= Lea Ackermann =

German Roman Catholic nun and activist (1937–2023)

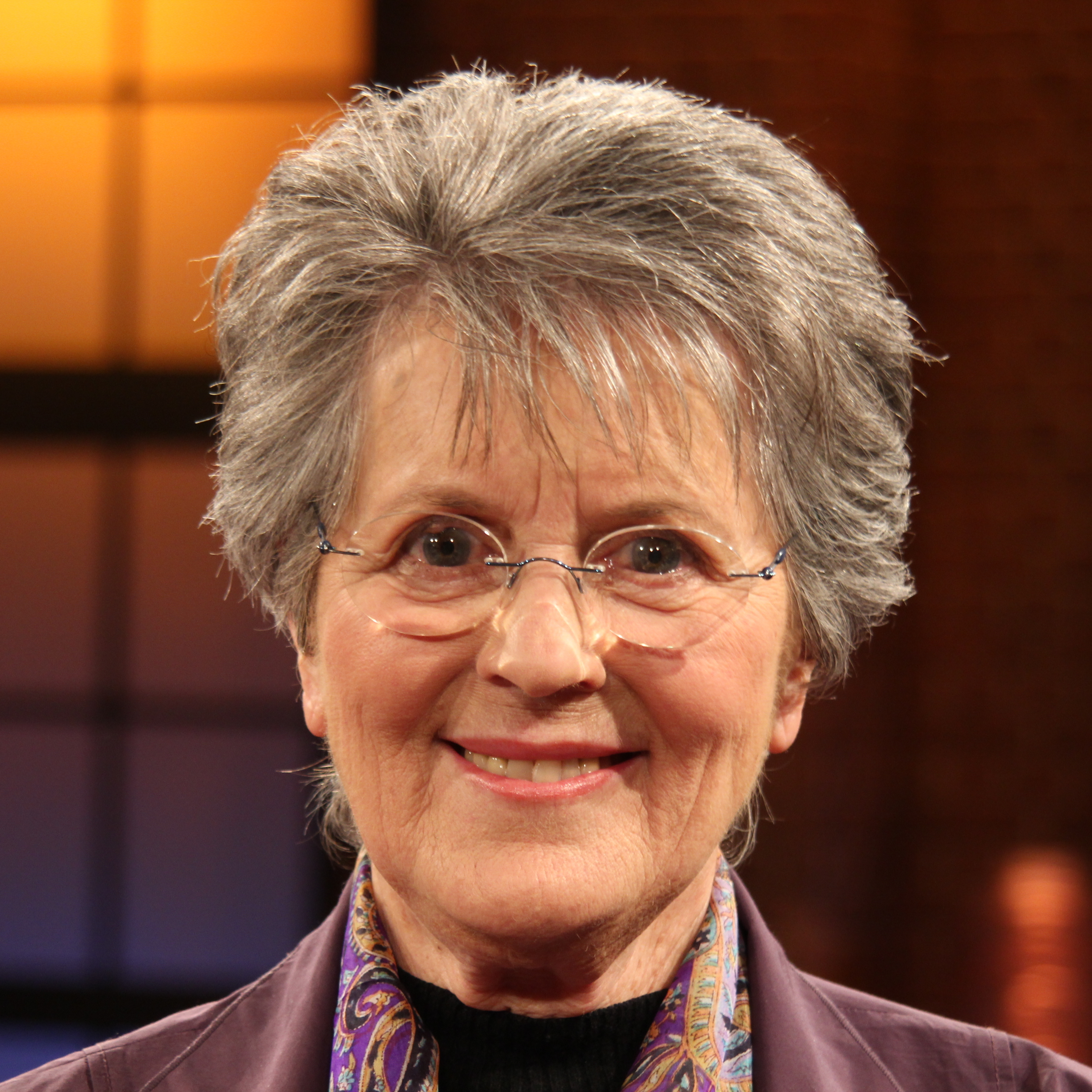
- Ackermann in 2012
- Born: 2 February 1937; Völklingen, Germany
- Died: 31 October 2023 (aged 86); Trier, Rhineland-Palatinate, Germany
- Education: LMU Munich
- Occupations: Nun; teacher; activist
- Organizations: Missionary Sisters of Our Lady of Africa; Solwodi
- Awards: Order of Merit of the Federal Republic of Germany

Lea Ackermann (2 February 1937 – 31 October 2023) was a German Catholic nun of the Missionary Sisters of Our Lady of Africa, an activist fighting sex tourism and forced prostitution, first in Africa where she founded the Solwodi organisation. Beginning in 1987, she worked in the same field in Germany. She received the Order of Merit of the Federal Republic of Germany and other awards.

== Life ==
Ackermann was born in Völklingen on 2 February 1937, and grew up in Saarbrücken. After finishing school, she was a banking apprentice, and then worked for a bank, including for one year in Paris.

In 1960, Ackermann decided to join the order of the Missionary Sisters of Our Lady of Africa, also known as the White Sisters. She studied languages, theology, pedagogy, and psychology. In 1977, she earned a PhD in pedagogy at LMU Munich with a dissertation about education in Rwanda.

She worked as a teacher in Rwanda and Kenya, where she came into contact with women who were victims of sexual exploitation, human trafficking, sex tourism, and forced prostitution. In 1985, together with Fritz Köster SAC, she founded the Solwodi organisation in Mombasa, living a life of "solidarity with women in distress". The project offers counseling and education to help women get back on their feet. Ackermann later founded with Agnes Mailu a subproject to help girls, Solgidi (Solidarity with girls in distress).

After her return to Germany in 1987, she founded Solwodi Deutschland, which developed into an organisation operating in 18 locations, with state associations in North Rhine-Westphalia, Lower Saxony, Rhineland-Palatine, Bavaria, Baden-Württemberg, and Berlin. They take care of women who came to Germany as refugees or immigrants, who have experienced sexual exploitation, forced prostitution, and forced marriage. The women receive social and psychological care, medical and legal support, and help in finding jobs and homes. She was heard as an expert in the Bundestag parliament in 2013, where she demanded the right of residence for all victims of forced prostitution from non-EU countries. She held lectures and directed Solwodi until the age of 85.

Ackermann appeared without a nun's habit, wearing only a cross as a necklace. She was a resident of Hirzenach, where she lived in a former priest's house among vineyards. Due to health reasons, she moved to a senior citizens' home in Trier a few weeks before she died.

Ackermann died in a hospital in Trier on 31 October 2023, at age 86.

== Awards ==
Ackermann received the Order of Merit of the Federal Republic of Germany in 1996, the Order of Merit of Rhineland of Merit of the Federal Republic of Germany on 29 February 2012 for her work for women's rights. She was awarded the Augsburger Friedenspreis in 2014, and the Eine-Welt-Medaille (One World Medal) in Gold for her life's achievements in 2019 by Minister Gerd Müller from the Federal Ministry for Economic Cooperation and Development. She was nominated for Sakharov prize in 2021.

== Publications ==
- Ackermann, Lea; Fritz Köster (2007). Über Gott und die Welt Gespräche am Küchentisch (in German). München: Kösel. ISBN 978-3-466-36737-5. OCLC 706980569.
- Ackermann, Lea; Cornelia Filter (2009). Um Gottes Willen, Lea! mein Einsatz für Frauen in Not (in German). Freiburg, Br: Herder. ISBN 978-3-451-06029-8. OCLC 319862237.
- Ackermann, Lea; Mary Kreutzer; Alicia Allgäuer (2010). In Freiheit leben, das war lange nur ein Traum mutige Frauen erzählen von ihrer Flucht aus Gewalt und moderner Sklaverei (in German). München: Kösel. ISBN 978-3-466-30878-1. OCLC 763851859.
