= Leopold Ackermann =

Leopold Ackermann (17 November 1771, Vienna – 9 September 1831), known by his cloistral name as Petrus Fourerius, was a professor of exegesis.

He entered on 10 October 1790 in the choral order (canon's regular of St Augustine) of Klosterneuburg and studied from 1791-1795 in Vienna. In the following, he became priest and professor for oriental languages at the Stiftshof in Vienna, in 1800 also librarian. He earned his doctorate in theology in 1802, and in 1806 a professorship in exegesis, continuing for 25 years.

== Publications ==
- Introductio in libros Veteris Foederis usibus academicis accomodata (Vienna, 1825,3 editions)
- Archeologia biblica, 1826
- "Prophetae Minores perpetua annotatione illustrata" (Vienna, 1830) philological observations on previous works.

== Sources ==
- Allgemeine Deutsche Biographie - online version at Wikisource
