= Catharina Elisabeth Velten =

German stage actress and theatre manager

Catharina Elisabeth Velten née Paulsen (1646–1712) was a German stage actress and theatre manager. She was engaged as an actor in the theater of her father Carl Andreas Paulsen and then her spouse Johannes Velten, and finally became the manager of the famous Hochdeutsche Hofcomödianten in 1692–1712.

== Life and career ==
She was the daughter of the actor-manager Carl Andreas Paulsen (1620–1679) and the actress Catharina Lydia Paulsen (d. 1675). In 1671, she married the actor-manager Johannes Velten (1640–1692). Her husband took over her father's theatre company in 1678.

In the mid 17th century, women started to appear onstage in Germany, and in September 1655, "female players" are noted to have been performed in Frankfurt for the first time. Under Magister Velthen and his father-in-law, the first actresses were employed in Germany. Velthens wife Catharina Elisabeth Velten (1646–1712) acted with her mother and sister on stage in first in her father's and then in her husband's theater.

The theater of her father was a family company, and both Catharina Elisabeth, her sister and her mother acted in it alongside her father and later her husband and brother-in-law. She debuted on the stage as a child, and acted in her father's and then in her husband's theater company. After the death of her husband in 1692, she took over the theater herself as manager and director. Her company was famous in Germany and the Nordic countries.

She is described as an educated woman, and are known to have participated in a debate with the theatre-hostile deacon Johann Joseph Winckler of Magdeburg, when she refused his Biblical arguments in Latin and Greek.

== See also ==
- Eleonora Constantia Ulich
