= Johan Christian Ackermann =

Swedish architect (1740–1795)

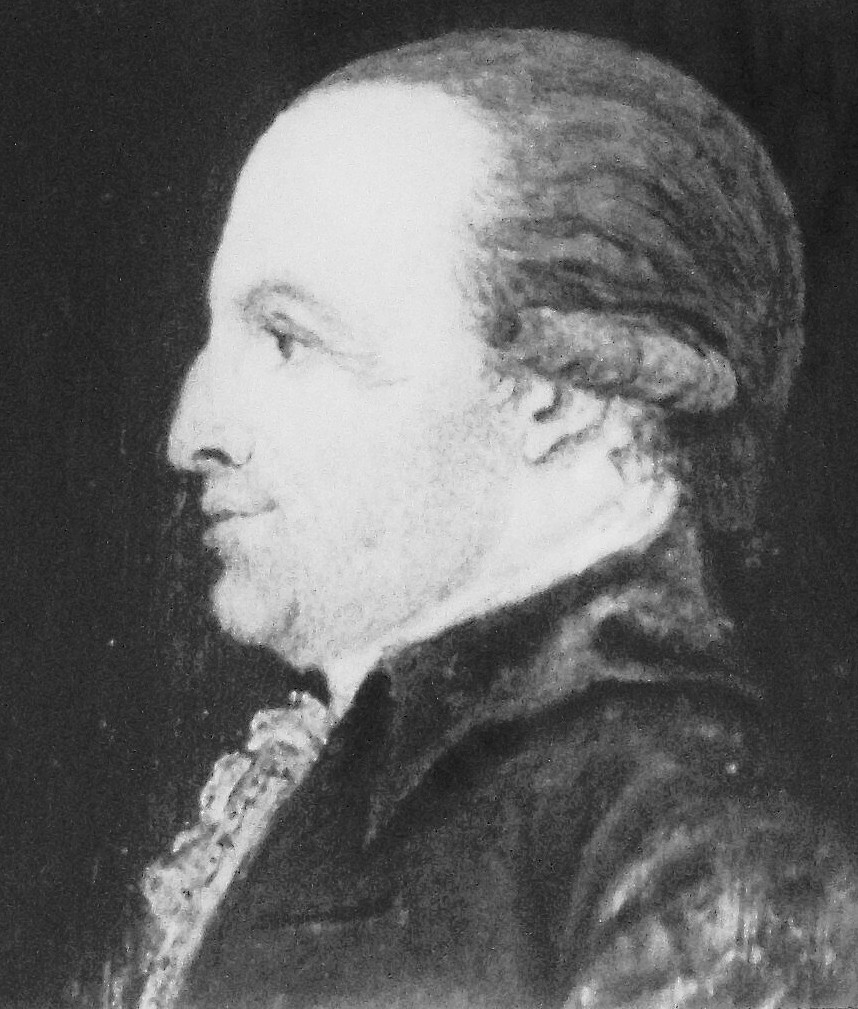
- Born: 1740; Electorate of Saxony
- Died: 1810
- Occupation: Landscape architect

Johan Christian Ackermann (1740–1795) was a Swedish landscape architect whose work was primarily inspired by English landscape gardens.

Johan Christian Ackermann was originally from Sachsen and moved to Sweden at the age of 22. He was initially employed at the Ekolsund Castle garden. Following a dispute with his employer, he decided to open his own market garden. In 1774, he became the director of the royal gardens at Karlberg Palace. In 1785, he took leadership of the continued construction of Haga Park from his predecessor Fredrik Magnus Piper. From 1787 until 1790, his work primarily consisted of channel and islet landscape design. In 1800, Ackermann oversaw the planting of roughly 26,000 trees at each of the garden centers of Hagaparken. He was also notably employed by Samuel af Ugglas to shape the English park at Forsmark.
