= Jens Ackermann =

German politician (born 1975)

Jens Ackermann (born 2 July 1975 in Magdeburg) is a German politician and member of the FDP in the Bundestag.
