= Johann Heinrich Böhm =

Austrian actor, singer and theatre director

Johann Heinrich Böhm (1740 in Upper Austria – 1792 in Aachen) was an Austrian actor, singer, theater manager and theatre director.

== Life and career ==
There are hardly any records of the early years of Böhm, who obviously grew up and trained in the Viennese theatre tradition. He is first mentioned in 1770 as a performer in the theatre company of theatre manager Kajetan von Schaumburg in Brno, whose troupe he took over in September of the same year. Böhm went on the road with this travelling theatre over the next few years, trying to raise the standard by performing less burlesque performances. In 1776, Böhm first gave guest performances at the Theater am Kärntnertor in Vienna, where he worked with Jean Georges Noverre, among others, and two years later at Vienna's Burgtheater at Michaelerplatz, where he himself also appeared as an actor, singer and director.

From 1778, Böhm went on tour again with his theatre company, which also had its own orchestra attached, first to Salzburg, where he met Leopold Mozart, who paid him high tribute for his performance practice. During this time, he also developed a lifelong friendship with Leopold's son Wolfgang Amadeus Mozart, who composed the fragmentary Singspiel Zaide (KV 344/366b) for him in 1779. A year later, Böhm made a guest appearance in Augsburg, where in May he performed Mozart's opera La finta giardiniera in the German translation by Franz Xaver Stierle under the title Die verstellte Gärtnerin.
