= Pickelhering =

Comedy stock character

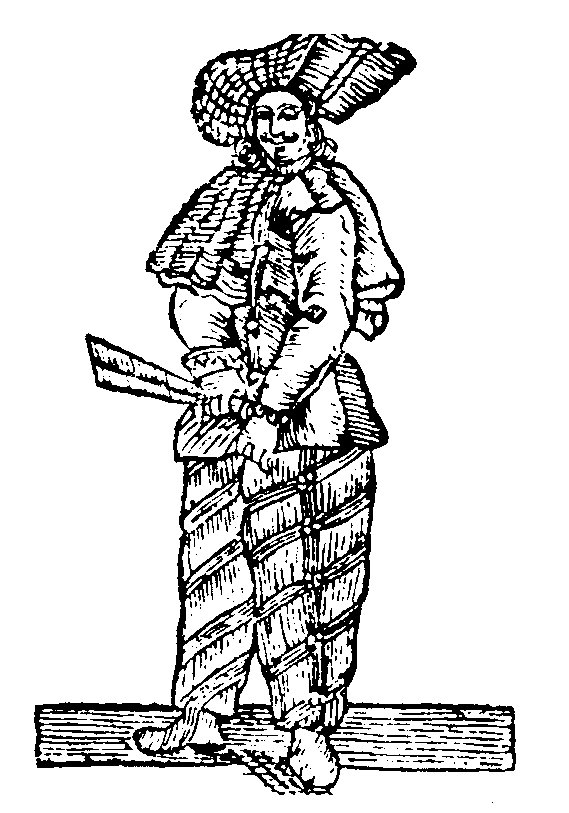
Title woodcut of Pickelhering's Wedding, 1752

Pickelhering or Pickelhäring was the nickname given to the comic stock character or stage buffoon in English comedy troupes that travelled through Germany in the 17th century. The term literally meant "pickled herring".

As with wurst ("sausage") in the name, Hanswurst, the figure of fun in 18th century German travelling theatres, or potage ("soup") in the name, Jean Potage, its French equivalent, the name refers to the everyday fare of the common people as opposed to the fine food of court society. Pickelhering is thus a servant figure in contrast to the high-ranking characters of the Haupt-und-Staatsaktions, the German dramas performed by such theatres. The name also alludes to the greediness that has characterized comic characters since Aristophanes.

== History ==
According to Joel B. Lande: "The text name first appears in Christopher Marlowe’s Doctor Faustus, when the allegorical embodiment of gluttony refers to his godfather as Peter Pickelherring. For an attempt to uncover the etymological origin of the sobriquet, see John Alexander, 'Will Kemp, Thomas Sacheville, and Pickelhering: A Consanguinity and Confluence of Three Early Modern Clown Personas,' Daphnis 3, no. 4 (2007): 463–486."

In 1649, Pickelhering appears as a named character in German political satire, "Conversation between the English Pickelhering and the French Jan Potagchen, about the shameful execution of Royal Majesty in England, Scotland and Ireland."

Andreas Gryphius has a Pickelhering appear in his play Absurda Comica oder Herr Peter Squentz (1658) as "the king's comic advisor".

Johann Wolfgang von Goethe portrays a Pickleherring (with the L and E reversed) in the novel Wilhelm Meister's Apprenticeship (1794) as a member of a traveling acrobatic show.

=== 20th century to present ===
In 2023 The Simpsons episode "Clown v. Board of Education," which featured a clown-themed elementary school, Pickelhering is Bart's answer to "the first clown to wear a double-winged neck ruff."

== See also ==
- Pierrot, a tragic stock character of pantomime

== Literature ==
- Beller, Manfred and Joseph Theodoor Leerssen, eds. (2007). "Character (Dramatic)" in Imagology: The Cultural Construction and Literary Representation of National Characters. Amsterdam/New York: Rodopi.
