= Johann Adam Ackermann =

German painter

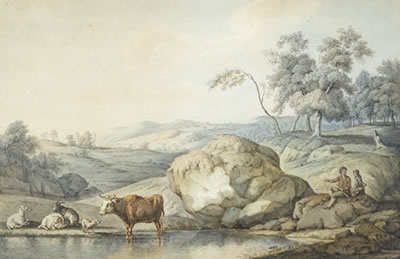
- Landscape near water
- Born: 3 November 1780; Mainz, Electorate of Mainz
- Died: 27 March 1853 (aged 72); Frankfurt, Hesse-Nassau
- Known for: Painting
- Movement: Landscape

Johann Adam Ackermann (3 November 1780 – 27 March 1853) was a German landscape painter of the early 19th century.

He was born in Mainz and moved to Frankfurt am Main in 1804. His best-known works are his winter landscapes and watercolours. He died in Frankfurt.

Johann Ackermann was the brother of Georg Friedrich Ackermann (1787, Mainz – 1843, Frankfurt am Main), who also painted landscapes but with less success.

== See also ==
- List of German painters

== Sources ==
- Allgemeine Deutsche Biographie
