= Sophie Charlotte Ackermann =

German actress (1714–1792)

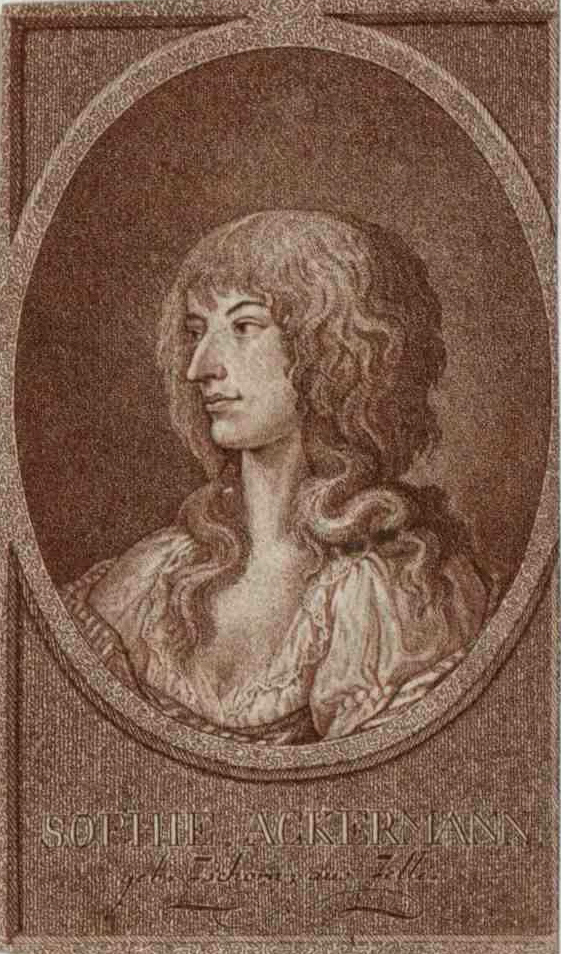
- Born: May 10, 1714
- Occupation: Actress

Sophie Charlotte Ackermann (née Bierreichel) (10 May 1714 – 14 October 1792) was a German actress from Berlin.

== Biography ==
She first married an organist named Schröder, who was unable to support his family. She entered the stage in 1740 in Lüneburg and established her own troupe in 1741 who failed in 1744. She left the stage for three years. In 1749, she married Konrad Ackermann in Moscow. They left Russia in 1751 and founded the famous Ackermann troupe (Ackermann'sche Gesellschaft).

The troupe visited Danzig, Königsberg, Breslau, Warsaw, Leipzig, Halle, then Frankfurt am Main and with the beginning of the Seven Years' War via Strasbourg to Switzerland. After the peace treaty, they returned via Strasbourg, Frankfurt, Mainz, Braunschweig, Hanover to Hamburg which became the domicile of the troupe. In 1767 the troupe was sold to a consortium of private owners, called the Hamburgische Entreprise, whose main backer was Abel Seyler, who employed Gotthold Ephraim Lessing as its dramaturge. The Entreprise was home to famous founders of German histrionics such as Friedrich Ludwig Schröder and Konrad Ekhof.

Her children were Dorothea Ackermann, Sophie Charlotte Ackermann and Marie Magdalene Charlotte Ackermann. She died in Hamburg.

== Sources ==
- Allgemeine Deutsche Biographie - online version at Wikisource
- Born-on-this-Day.com
