= Friedrich Ludwig Schröder =

German actor (1744–1816)

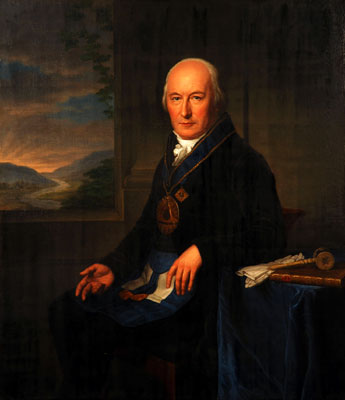
Friedrich Ludwig Schröder.

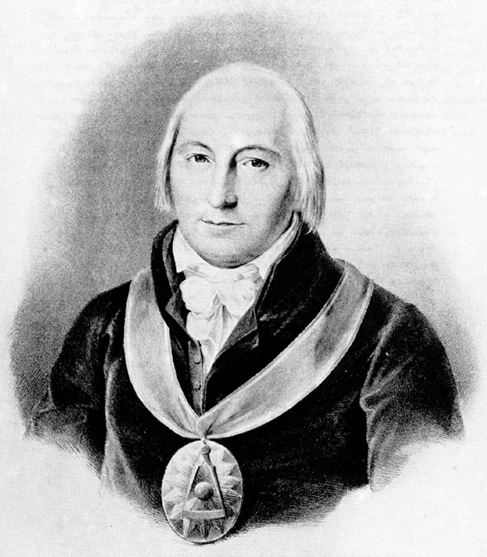
Friedrich Ludwig Schröder.

Friedrich Ludwig Schröder (3 November 1744 – 3 September 1816) was a German actor, manager, dramatist and prominent masonic leader.

He was born in Schwerin. Shortly after his birth, his mother, Sophie Charlotte Bierreichel (1714–1792), separated from her husband, and, joining a theatrical company, toured with success in Poland and Russia. Subsequently, she married Konrad Ernst Ackermann and appeared with his company in many German cities, finally settling in Hamburg. Young Schröder early showed considerable talent, but his childhood was rendered so unhappy by his stepfather that he ran away from home and learned the trade of a shoemaker.

He rejoined his parents, however, in 1759, and became an actor. In 1764 he appeared with the Ackermann company in Hamburg, playing leading comedy parts; but these he soon exchanged for the tragic roles in which he became famous. These included Hamlet, King Lear and Philip in Schiller's Don Carlos.

After Ackermann's death in 1771 Schröder and his mother took over the management of the Hamburg theatre, and he began to write plays, largely adaptations from the English, making his first success with the comedy Die Arglistige. In 1780 he left Hamburg, and after a tour with his wife, Anna Christina Hart, a former pupil, accepted an engagement at the Court Theatre in Vienna. In 1785 Schröder again took over his Hamburg management and conducted the theatre with marked ability until his retirement in 1798. The Hamburg theatre again falling into decay, the master was once more summoned to assist in its rehabilitation, and in 1811 he returned to it for one year. He died in 1816.

As an actor Schröder was the first to depart from the stilted style of former tragedians; as a manager he raised the standard of plays presented and contributed, with Abel Seyler, to introducing Shakespeare on the German stage. Schröder's Dramatische Werke, with an introduction by Tieck, were published in four volumes (Berlin, 1831).
