= Konrad Ernst Ackermann =

German actor (1710–1771)

Konrad Ackermann
- Born: 1 February 1710; Schwerin, Mecklenburg-Strelitz
- Died: 13 November 1771 (aged 61)
- Spouse: Sophie Bierreichel
- Children: Dorothea and Marie

Konrad Ernst Ackermann (1 February 1710 – 13 November 1771) was a German actor.

Ackermann first accompanied field marshal Burkhard Christoph von Münnich on his travels and in battles. Born in Schwerin, he first entered the stage under a certain Stolle. In 1740, he entered the troupe of Johann Friedrich Schönemann in Lüneburg, where he first met his future wife Sophie Charlotte Bierreichel, who took the lead of the troupe in 1741 in Hamburg. The troupe dissolved in 1744 and they lived with relatives of Konrad in Mecklenburg. In 1747, he was hired in Danzig, later in St. Petersburg. In 1749, he and Sophie visited Moscow, where they married; they left Russia in 1751 and founded the Ackermann troupe (Ackermann'sche Gesellschaft).

The troupe visited Danzig, Königsberg, Breslau, Warsaw, Leipzig, Halle, then Frankfurt and with the beginning of the Seven Years' War via Strasbourg, France, to Switzerland. After the peace treaty, they returned via Strasbourg, Frankfurt, Mainz, Braunschweig, and Hanover to Hamburg, which became the domicile of the troupe. In 1762, Johann Michael Böck joined the troupe. Friederike Sophie Seyler also joined around this time, and both remained members until the troupe was sold in 1767.

In 1767, the troupe was sold to a consortium of private owners, called the Hamburg National Theatre or the Hamburgische Entreprise, also known as Lessing's Dramaturgie, with Abel Seyler as its main backer. The dramaturgie was home to famous founders of German histrionics such as Friedrich Ludwig Schröder and Konrad Ekhof. In 1769 many of Ackermann's actors joined the Seyler theatrical company.

His children with Sophie Charlotte were Dorothea and Marie Ackermann.

== Sources ==
- Allgemeine Deutsche Biographie – online version at Wikisource
- Born-on-this-Day.com
