= Hochdeutsche Hofcomödianten =

German theatre company

The Hochdeutsche Hofcomödianten, called Velthenska sällskapet (Velthen Company) in Sweden, was a travelling German theatre company, active in Germany from the 1650s, as well as in Poland, the Baltic and the Scandinavian countries of Denmark, Norway and Sweden between 1678 and 1712. The company played a vital role in the theater history of Scandinavia, where a local theater was not yet developed and where it toured from at least the 1690s onward: in 1707, it became the first professional theater to have performed in Norway.

== History ==
The company was founded by the actor-manager Carl Andreas Paulsen (1620–1679) after the end of the Thirty Year's War in 1648. Carl Andreas Paulsen employed only German language speaking actors in his theater, and thus named it Hochdeutsche Hofcomödianten. This separated it from the contemporary court theatres in Germany at the time, which were active at the Princely courts and normally employed foreign actors (often Italians). By contrast, the travelling theatres, such as the Hochdeutsche Hofcomödianten, performed for the public in the native language. The Hochdeutsche Hofcomödianten also made the innovation of employing women on stage. Previously, men had performed the female roles in the theater in Germany. Carl Andreas Paulsen, however, had his wife Catharina Lydia Paulsen and daughters perform with him and his son-in-laws onstage; and after this, the use of female actors became common in Germany.

In 1678, the theatre was taken over by the actor Johannes Velten after his marriage to Paulsen's daughter Catharina Elisabeth Velten. The company had a monopoly in Saxony, and was regarded as one of the best in Germany.

Upon the death of Velthen in 1692, the theater company was taken over by his widow Catharina Elisabeth Velten. In 1694-95, the company toured Germany, Poland and the Baltic. Its whereabouts in 1695-97 is unconfirmed, but it is possibly this company that performed in Copenhagen and Stockholm at that time. In 1697, the Saxon monopoly of the company was repelled. From 1700 onward, the Velthen Company toured between Vienna, Frankfurt, Copenhagen, Norway, Stockholm and Riga. Between 1707 and 1710, they toured all the Nordic countries and performed in Copenhagen in Denmark and in Bergen and Oslo in Norway: in Norway, they became the likely first professional theater to have performed. At the time of their visit in Norway, their cast were composed by Denner the Elder and Denner the Younger, Elisabet Denner, Big Müller, Little Müller, Dorseus and Johann Christian Spiegelberg, and their repertoire included plays by Corneille and Molière.

When Velthen retired to settle in Vienna in 1712, the Velthen theater company was dissolved. However, the former members formed a new theater company under the leadership of one of the actors, Johann Christian Spiegelberg (died 1732), which was managed by his widow Elisabet Denner after his death, and which was also active in Germany and Scandinavia.

Directors

- cirka 1650–1678: Carl Andreas Paulsen
- 1678–1692: Johannes Velten
- 1692–1712: Catharina Elisabeth Velten
