= Karl Ludwig Giesecke =

German actor, librettist, polar explorer and mineralogist

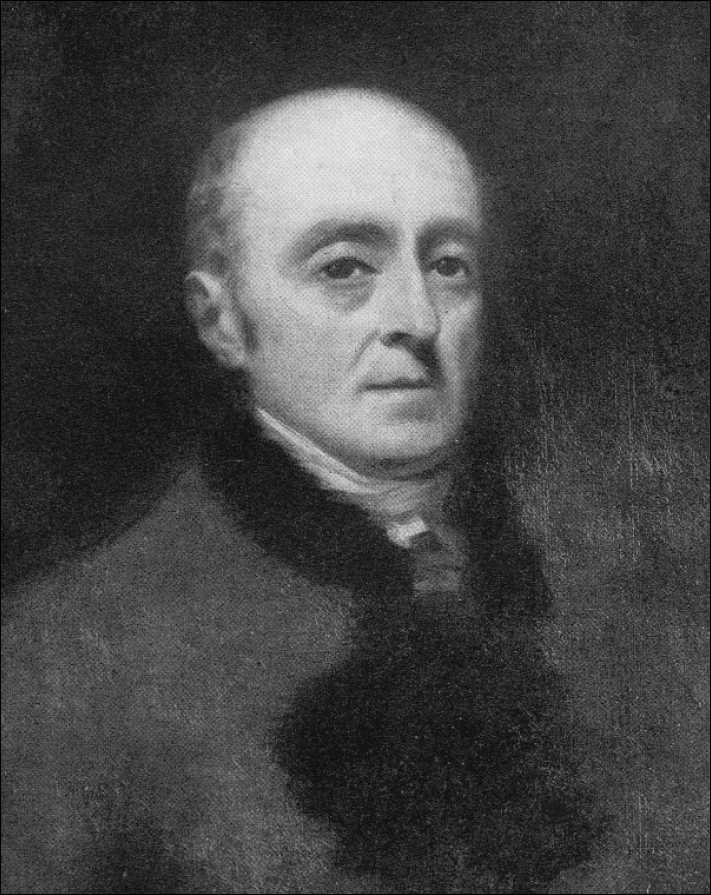
Portrait of Carl Ludwig Giesecke by Sir Henry Raeburn, ca. 1813

Carl Ludwig Giesecke FRSE (6 April 1761 in Augsburg – 5 March 1833 in Dublin) was a German actor, librettist, polar explorer and mineralogist. In his youth he was called Johann Georg Metzler; in his later career in Ireland he was Sir Charles Lewis Giesecke. Late in his life he claimed to friends to have been, in his youth, the librettist of Mozart’s famous opera The Magic Flute.

== Early life ==
His father was Johann Georg Metzler, a Protestant who worked as a tailor in Augsburg. His mother was named Sibylla Magdalena Götz. He attended the Gymnasium in Augsburg, and did well academically, as is known from the surviving remarks of his schoolmaster recommending him for university study. He attended the University of Göttingen from 1781 to 1784, studying law. He also developed a side interest in mineralogy, attending the lectures of the naturalist Johann Friedrich Blumenbach.

It was in 1781 that he took the pseudonym by which he is now known. The name change was an effective cover for Giesecke's ancestry, which he always refused to discuss. Indeed, Giesecke's original name remained unknown to scholars until 1910, when the Danish geologist K. J. V. Steenstrup discovered an 1810 letter from his sister to the Danish authorities enquiring about the welfare of her brother, then in Greenland; the letter established Giesecke's relationship with the Augsburg Metzlers. Whittaker suggests that he chose "Giesecke" (also spelled "Gieseke") in admiration of the poet Nikolaus Dietrich Giseke.

== His career in the theater ==
In 1784, he left the university to become an itinerant player, and worked in various theaters over a period of six years. In 1789, he became employed in the Theater auf der Wieden in Vienna, then under the direction of Johann Friedel. When Emanuel Schikaneder's troupe took over the theater as its new resident company later in the same year, Giesecke was one of the few players that Schikaneder retained.

As remembered by Ignaz Castelli, Giesecke was not outstanding as an actor; he "has no distinct speciality and plays whatever roles come his way." His value to the Schikaneder company was more as a stage manager and especially as a writer and poet. According to Buch, there were three house writers in the company: Schikaneder himself, his wife Eleonore Schikaneder, and Giesecke.

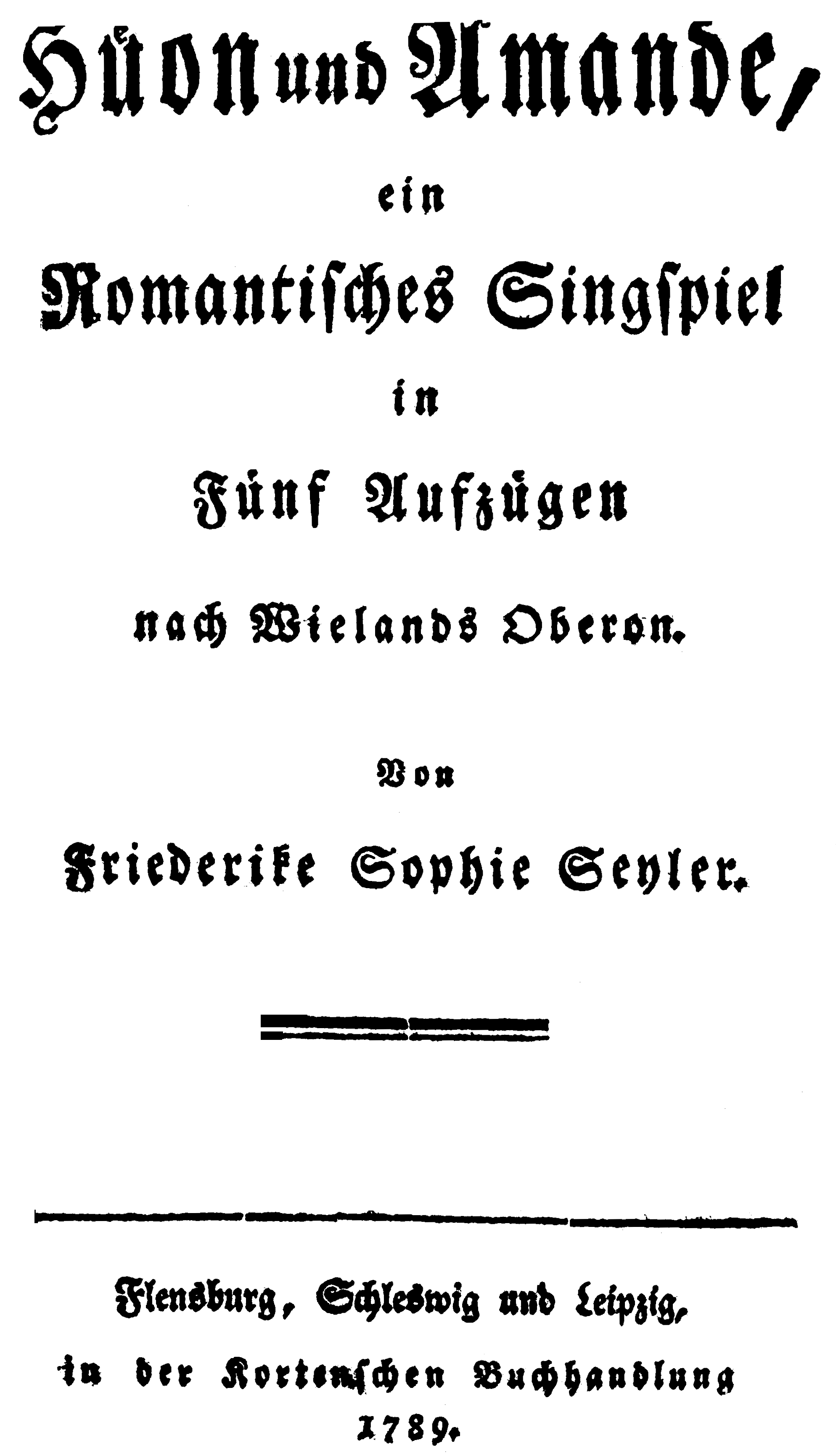
The original Hüon und Amande by Sophie Seyler

Giesecke achieved an early success with his adapted version of Sophie Seyler's Hüon und Amande, based on an earlier work by Christoph Martin Wieland and set to music by Paul Wranitzky. This was the first opera performed by Schikaneder's troupe at their new theater, and established a tradition within the company of fairy-tale operas that was to culminate two years later in Mozart's celebrated opera The Magic Flute. Oberon is similar to The Magic Flute in its plot and characters, and a number of the singers who participated in Oberon took similar roles in the later opera. As Giesecke had not acknowledged his debt to Sophie Seyler, he came under criticism for plagiarism. According to Peter Branscombe, "it has long been recognized that Giesecke, the named author of Wranitzky's libretto, deserves little credit for what is largely a plagiarism," concluding that "Giesecke's Oberon, König der Elfen is hardly more than a mild revision of Seyler's book."

In later work, Giesecke translated the Italian libretti of Mozart's operas Le nozze di Figaro (1793) and Così fan tutte (1794) into German. In total he was to write libretti for more than fifteen operas by various composers between 1789 and 1800; see listing below.

As an actor, Giesecke is remembered for having been in the cast for the premiere (30 September 1791) of The Magic Flute. He played the mostly speaking role of the First Slave. Later in life, he was said to have claimed to be the author of the opera's libretto, which is usually attributed to Emanuel Schikaneder; see discussion below.

During his Vienna years, Giesecke became a Freemason, joining "Zur gekrönten Hoffnung", the same lodge as Mozart. He is believed to have been the librettist for the "Freimaurerkantate" Laut verkünde unsre Freude, KV 623 (1791), a work written for and performed at a Masonic celebration just as Mozart's final illness was setting in (see Death of Mozart). The head of Giesecke's lodge was Ignaz von Born, a distinguished scientist who specializations included mineralogy. Other eminent mineralogists were also members of the lodge and Giesecke's membership evidently rekindled his interest in the subject.

When Giesecke ultimately departed from Vienna (1800), he did so under a shadow and perhaps in a hurry, as surviving court records show proceedings against him for non-payment of a year's rent. Personal effects he left behind were sold in 1801 to help cover this debt.

== As mineralogist ==
The departure from Vienna coincided with a major career shift: Giesecke abandoned the theater and switched to mineralogy and mineral trading. In 1801, he studied for some time with Abraham Gottlob Werner at the Bergakademie in Freiberg. Later, under the title of Royal Prussian Mine Counsellor (Königlicher Preussischer Bergrat), he conducted surveys in Sweden from 1803 until 1804 and in Norway in 1805. Eventually he settled in Copenhagen, where he worked as a mineral dealer, collector, and tutor.

He obtained approval from the Danish king Christian VII to explore the geology of the Faroe Islands, which he visited in 1805, and Greenland; the latter journey began in 1806. Giesecke established friendly relations with the Eskimo inhabitants and learned to travel in the umiak, the vessel used by the Eskimo women. He explored much of the coastline in this way. According to Mirsky, Giesecke "was frugal and spent his time 'hewing and cleaving stones from morning to nightfall.'"

Scientifically, the journey was a success; his investigations laid the foundation for Greenlandic mineralogy. However, it met with many difficulties, including the harsh Greenland winters and illness. Many of Giesecke's troubles resulted from the Napoleonic Wars, which reached their climax during his stay. Back home in Copenhagen, Giesecke's existing collections were destroyed when the British fleet bombarded the city. In 1806, Giesecke shipped a large collection of materials aboard the Danish ship Freuhlin, headed for Copenhagen. The ship was taken as a prize of war by the Royal Navy, and the collection auctioned off in Edinburgh in 1808.

Another consequence of the war was that Giesecke's stay in Greenland, originally planned for only two years, was extended to seven: the British had captured the Danish fleet and Giesecke was unable to get home. His eventual return to Europe in August 1813 was picturesque; according to Dent "he landed at Hull, looking probably rather like Papageno, for his European clothes had worn out, and he was dressed as an Eskimo in fur and feathers."

The loss of the 1806 shipment was perhaps a blessing in disguise since it ultimately enhanced Giesecke's reputation in Britain. The collection was examined by the mineralogist Robert Jameson, who, unaware of its provenance, concluded it was worthless. Ninian Imrie and Thomas Allan suspected that a white mineral in the collection was the rare cryolite and bought the lot. However, it was only when Morten Wormskjold was detained in Edinburgh on his way to Greenland in 1812 that he could identify the collector as Giesecke and the provenance as Greenland. Another mineral in the collection was later named allanite after Thomas Allan. Thus the value of the collection was ultimately recognized prior to Giesecke's return to Europe.

=== Researches in Greenland other than in mineralogy ===
Giesecke's travels up and down the coast of Greenland proved important from the perspective of geography. On his return he was consulted by mariners such as John Franklin and William Scoresby, who played a role in the eventual discovery of the Northwest Passage, the famously elusive sea route around the northern edge of North America.

He also collected botanical specimens. These included some bryophyte species growing on rocks. Giesecke collected specimens of the Greenlandic bellflower, which he found deviated much from the European forms, and sent them to the botanist Lorenz Chrysanth von Vest. The latter established a new species and named it Campanula gieseckiana to the honour of Giesecke. The new species was formally published by Roemer and Schultes in the 16th edition of Linnaeus' Systema Vegetabilium.

Lastly, Giesecke contributed to the ethnography and human history of Greenland through his observations of the Eskimos and of the extinct Viking settlements there.

A number of places in Greenland are named for him, e.g. Giesecke Dal on Disko Island, Giesecke Isfjord near Upernavik and lake Gieseckes Sø close to Kangerlussuaq.

== Professor in Dublin ==
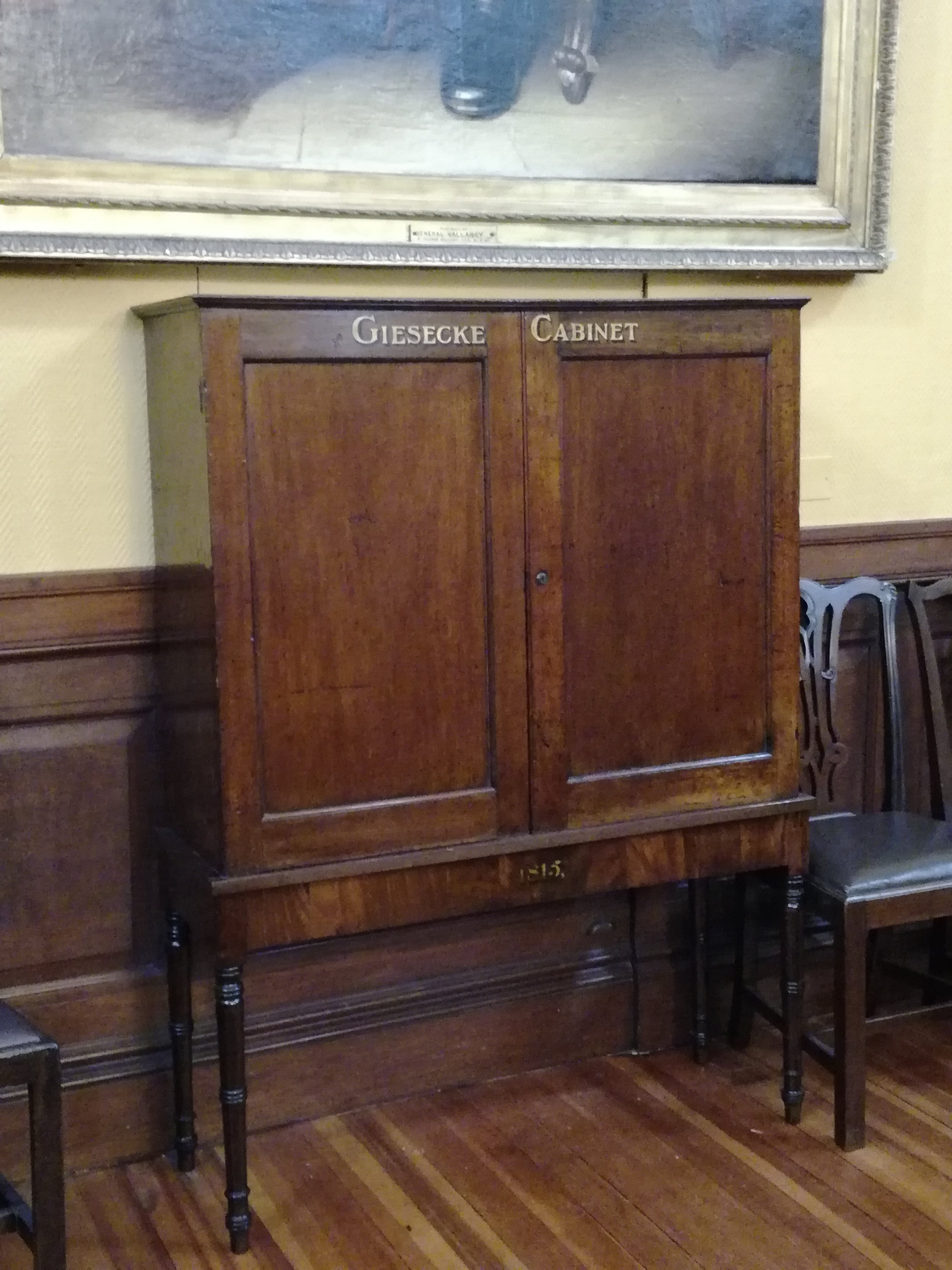
The cabinet which once contained the collections of Giesecke, in the RDS

On his return from Greenland Giesecke was lacking not only European clothing but also money and a source of income. But his scientific accomplishments were to produce a major shift in his fortunes. Thomas Allan had already recognized the importance of Giesecke's collections, and he invited Giesecke to stay with him in his home in a fashionable district of Edinburgh. It was at this time that Giesecke's portrait (shown above) was painted by the famous portraitist Henry Raeburn. After a few weeks, Allan encouraged Giesecke to apply for a new Professorship of Mineralogy in the Royal Dublin Society. Despite serious competition, Giesecke won the appointment and took up the position in 1813.

At the outset of his appointment he knew no English, but his gift for languages enabled him to make up for this lack through quick study; he eventually published extensively in English. Giesecke continued reporting his earlier investigations and other writings. In the same year 1814 he was admitted to the Order of the Dannebrog by King Frederick VI of Denmark; henceforth in Ireland he styled himself "Sir Charles Lewis Giesecke," so indicating the Danish honour, and using the English versions of German "Carl" and "Ludwig".

== The late Vienna journey and the Magic Flute authorship controversy ==
In 1817, Giesecke obtained leave of absence from his position and embarked on a long journey. He first visited Copenhagen in order to deal with business unfinished following his departure there for Greenland 11 years earlier. While there he fell ill, and "his life was despaired of" (Berry). He recovered, however, and continued onward to his birthplace of Augsburg, and eventually back to his old haunts in Vienna, with stops in various German cities on the way.

The main purpose of Giesecke's Vienna journey was to donate a collection of mineralogical specimens to the Emperor of Austria, Francis I. While there, he encountered old acquaintances from the theater. The tenor and opera manager Julius Cornet was present at such an encounter (Ignaz Seyfried, an old member of the Schikaneder troupe, was also there). Cornet wrote—three decades later, in 1849—the following:

On this occasion we discovered a lot about old times; amongst other things we learnt to see in him (who at that time had belonged to the prohibited order of freemasons) the real author of The Magic Flute (which moreover Seyfried already suspected.) I'm relating all this according to his own statement which we had no reason to doubt. ... Many thought that the prompter Helmböck had collaborated with Schikaneder. But Giesecke corrected us on this point too; only the figure of Papageno and the latter’s counterpart Papagena did he attribute to Schikaneder.

Elsewhere Cornet wrote:

And above all the truly German Magic Flute by Schikaneder and Giesecke, a member of the chorus who made the plan of the plot, the division of the scenes and the well known simple ('naïve') rhymes for him.

Subsequent scholarship has involved extensive disagreement about whether to believe Cornet, ranging from wholehearted endorsement of his report to utter rejection of it accompanied by aspersions on Giesecke's character. Certainly Mozart's own testimony does not support the Giesecke theory; in the catalogue that Mozart kept of his own works he entered The Magic Flute as "A German opera in two acts. By Emanuel Schikaneder." However, there is also a reasonable possibility that Giesecke was an unacknowledged collaborator with Schikaneder; the troupe frequently practiced coauthorship as a means of speeding the creation of new works.

Giesecke returned to Dublin in the late summer of 1819 and resumed his duties as professor.

== Fieldwork in Ireland ==
During the 1820s Giesecke embarked on field trips in rural Ireland for the purpose of mineralogical research: 1825 (Galway, Mayo, the island of Achill), 1826 (Donegal), and 1828 (Londonderry, Antrim, Tyrone, Down); see Works, below.

== Death ==
Giesecke remained in his post in Dublin and lived to the age of 72. His demise was sudden; according to Dent, "on March 5, 1833, though in failing health, he went out to dine with a friend in Dublin; after dinner, as they were sitting over their wine, he fell back in his chair and died." The RDS museum in Leinster House closed for two weeks as a mark of respect.

Giesecke never married and apparently left no children. He is buried in St. George's Church, Cemetery on Whitworth Road, Dublin.

== Assessment ==
Giesecke's posthumous reputation appears to rest more on his scientific contributions than his work in the theater. His collections can now be found in many museums in Europe. Part of them was given to the state of Austria directly by Giesecke. They are now at the Ethnological Museum of Berlin. Other parts are kept in Copenhagen.

== Works ==
=== Theatrical ===
The Grove Dictionary of Opera gives the following list of Giesecke's theatrical writings:

- (1789) Oberon, König der Elfen (Singspiel), Paul Wranitzky (an adapted version or plagiarism of Hüon und Amande by Sophie Seyler)
- (1791) Die Wiener Zeitung (Singspiel), Franz Xaver Gerl and Benedikt Schack
- (1792) Das Schlaraffenland (Singspiel), Gerl and Schack
- (1794) Der travestirte Hamlet (play), Vincenc Tuček
- (1795) Idris und Zenide, Franz Xaver Süssmayr
- (1796) Die zwölf schlafenden Jungfrauen ("The Twelve Sleeping Maids", play with songs), Matthäus Stegmayer
- (1796) Uriels Glöcklein, Stegmayer
- (1796) Die Belagerung von Cythère ("The Siege of Cythera"), translation of Cythère assiégée by Christoph Willibald Gluck, with additions by Franz Anton Hoffmeister
- (1798) Amadis, der fahrende Ritter von Gallien, G. Stenzerl
- (1798) Agnes Bernauerin (burlesque), Ignaz von Seyfried
- (1799) Die Pfaueninsel ("The island of peacocks"), Seyfried and Stegmayer
- (1799) Der travestierte Aeneas (farce), Seyfried and Stegmayer
- (1800) Aeneas in der Hölle (travesty), Stegmayer
- (1801) Die Sonnenjungfrau (travesty), Seyfried and Stegmayer

=== Scientific ===
- (1819) On the temporary residences of the Greenlanders during the winter season and on the population of north and south Greenland. Edinburgh: A. Constable.
- (1822) On Cryolite; a Fragment of a Journal. Edinburgh Philosophical Journal 6: 141–4.
- (1823) On the mineralogy of Disco Island. Transactions of the Royal Society of Edinburgh, 9: 263–272.
- (1824) On the Norwegian settlements on the eastern coast of Greenland, or Osterbygd, and their situation. Transactions of the Royal Irish Academy 14: 47–56.
- (1826) Account of a mineralogical excursion to the county of Donegal. Dublin: Royal Dublin Society.
- (1828) Second account of a mineralogical excursion to the counties of Donegal, Mayo, and Galway. Dublin: Royal Dublin Society.
- (1829) Account of a mineralogical excursion to the county of Antrim. Dublin: Royal Dublin Society.
- (1832) A descriptive catalogue of a new collection of materials in the museum of Royal Dublin Society. To which is added an Irish mineralogy. Dublin: Royal Dublin Society.
- (1861) Catalogue of a geological and geographical collection of minerals from the arctic regions from Cape Farewell to Baffin's Bay, lat. 59⁰ 14ʹ N., to 76⁰ 32ʹ N.. Dublin : McGlashan & Gill.
- (1878) Gieseckes Mineralogiske rejse i Grønland, ved F. Johnstrup. Med et tillæg om de grønlandske stednavnes retskrivning og etymologi af H. Rink. Edition: Hermed 3 kaart. Kjøbenhavn : B. Lunos bogtrykkerei.
- (1910) Bericht einer mineralogischen Reise in Groenland. ("Report on a mineralogical journey in Greenland") Meddelelser om Grønland 35: 1–478.

== Bibliography ==
- Abert, Hermann (2007) W. A. Mozart (translated by Stewart Spencer with new notes by Cliff Eisen). Yale University Press. ISBN 0-300-07223-6.
- Batley, E. M. (1965) Emanuel Schikaneder: the librettist of 'Die Zauberflöte'. Music & Letters 46: 231–236.
- Berry, Henry Fitz-Patrick (1915) A history of the Royal Dublin society. Longmans, Green and Co.
- Buch, David (ed.) (2007) Der Stein der Weisen. Volume 76 of Recent researches in the music of the Classical Era. A-R Editions, Inc. ISBN 0-89579-616-3.
- Buch, David (2008) Magic flutes & enchanted forests: the supernatural in eighteenth-century musical theater. University of Chicago Press. ISBN 0-226-07810-8.
- Dent, Edward Joseph (1913) Mozart's Operas: A Critical Study. McBride, Nast & Company.
- Freyhan, Michael (2009) 'The Authentic Magic Flute Libretto'. The Scarecrow Press 2009. ISBN 978-0-8108-6657-7. Chapter 6 'Karl Ludwig Giesecke' pp.123-141 and Appendix A 'The Character and Career of Karl Ludwig Giesecke (1761-1833)' with 'Foreword by Stephen Moorbath, F.R.S., Professor Emeritus of Earth Sciences, Oxford University' pp.163-194.
- Honolka, Kurt and Reinhard G. Pauly (1990) Papageno: Emanuel Schikaneder, Man of the Theater in Mozart's Time. Hal Leonard Corporation. ISBN 0-931340-21-7.
- Mirsky, Jeannette (1998) To the Arctic!: The Story of Northern Exploration from Earliest Times. 2nd ed. University of Chicago Press. ISBN 0-226-53179-1.
- Sweet, Jessie M. (1974) "Robert Jameson and the explorers: The search for the north-west passage part I." Annals of Science 31: 21–47.
- Whittaker, Alfred (2001) Karl Ludwig Giesecke: His life, Performance and Achievements. Mitteilungen der Österreichischen Mineralogischen Gesellschaft 146: 451–479.
- Whittaker, Alfred (2007) "The travels and travails of Sir Charles Lewis Giesecke." In Patrick Wyse Jackson, ed., Four centuries of geological travel: the search for knowledge on foot, bicycle, sledge and camel. Volume 287 of Geological Society special publication. Geological Society. ISBN 1-86239-234-X.
- Whittaker, Alfred (2009) "Karl Ludwig Giesecke: his albums and his likely involvement in the writing of the libretto of Mozart's opera The Magic Flute." Mitteilungen der Österreichischen Mineralogischen Gesellschaft 155 (2009).
- Žižek, Slavoj and Mladen Dolar (2002) Opera's Second Death. Routledge. ISBN 0-415-93017-0.

[
