= Gillian Keith =

Canadian opera singer

Gillian Keith (born 3 April 1972 in Toronto) is a Canadian/British operatic soprano, originally from Toronto, Canada, and living in London, UK.

Keith was educated at the Royal Academy of Music in London, Schulich School of Music of McGill University, Montreal, and at the Royal Conservatory of Music in Toronto.

== Opera ==
Keith's roles include:

- Zerbinetta in Strauss's Ariadne auf Naxos at the Royal Opera House, Welsh National Opera and Opera de Oviedo
- Tytania in Britten's A Midsummer Night's Dream at the Royal Opera House and English National Opera
- Lubanara in The Philosopher's Stone (Der Stein der Weisen) by Mozart, Henneberg, Schack, Gerl and Schikaneder, Bampton Classical Opera
- Poppea in Monteverdi's L'incoronazione di Poppea in Theater Basel and Boston Early Music Festival
- Jeptha in Handel's Jeptha, Buxton Festival
- Philine in Ambroise Thomas's Mignon, Buxton Festival
- Sylvie in Gounod's La colombe, Buxton Festival
- Iole in Handel's Hercules, Buxton Festival
- Silvia in Mozart's Ascanio in Alba, Buxton Festival
- Gloria in HK Gruber's Gloria: A Pigtale for Mahogany Opera Group/Bregenz Festival
- Tiny in Britten's Paul Bunyan, Bregenz Festival
- Nannetta in Verdi's Falstaff at English National Opera
- Woodbird in Wagner's Siegfried, Scottish Opera
- Amor in Gluck's Orfeo ed Euridice, Scottish Opera
- Papagena in Mozart's The Magic Flute, Scottish Opera and Opera Atelier
- Soprano in Purcell's King Arthur at English National Opera and in San Francisco
- Soprano in Bach's St John Passion at English National Opera
- Dew Fairy in Engelbert Humperdinck's Hansel and Gretel at the BBC Proms

Ginevra in Handel's Ariodante, Halle Handel Festival 2007

== Recordings ==
- Bach Cantatas for Soprano Solo Volume I – Gillian Keith (soprano) with Armonico Consort. Label: Signum
- Handel German Arias – Gillian Keith (soprano) with Florilegium. Label: Channel Classics
- Gillian Keith Bei Strauss – Gillian Keith (soprano); Simon Lepper (piano). Label: Champs Hill Records
- Handel: Gloria – Gillian Keith (soprano), John Eliot Gardiner (conductor) English Baroque Soloists. Label: Philips
- Schubert Among Friends – Gillian Keith (soprano), Aldeburgh Connection, Stephen Ralls and Bruce Ubukata, piano, with Michael Schade, tenor and Colin Ainsworth, tenor
- Bach Cantatas Vol. 23: Arnstadt/Echternach – Gillian Keith (soprano); Daniel Taylor (countertenor); Charles Daniels (tenor); Stephen Varcoe (Bass); Monteverdi Choir/English Baroque Soloists; John Eliot Gardiner (conductor). Label: Soli Deo Gloria
- Debussy – Early Songs – Gillian Keith (soprano); Simon Lepper (piano). Label: Deux-Elles Ltd.
- Debussy – Songs For His Muse – Gillian Keith (soprano); Simon Lepper (piano). Label: Deux-Elles Ltd.
- Luigi Dallapiccola: Orchestral Works Vol. 2 (in Partita and Quattro Liriche di Antonio Machado) – Gillian Keith (soprano); Paul Watkins (cello); BBC Philharmonic; Gianandrea Noseda (conductor). Label: Chandos Records
- Ariadne On Naxos Richard Strauss – Gillian Keith (soprano), Sir Richard Armstrong (conductor) Scottish Chamber Orchestra, with Christine Brewer, Alice Coote, Robert Dean-Smith, Alan Opie. Label: Chandos

== Awards ==
- 1998 Royal Over-Seas League Vocal Competition First Prize Winner
- 2000 Kathleen Ferrier Award
- 2003 Associate of the Royal Academy of Music (London, UK)

== Sources ==
- Crew, Robert, " Reunion for Gillian Keith; Soprano is back in town for Calisto Cavalli opera first performed in 1651 ", Toronto Star, 15 April 2004, p. G4
- Kathleen Ferrier Awards Winners (official website)
- Philharmonia Orchestra, Gillian Keith
