= Dies Bildnis ist bezaubernd schön =

1791 operatic aria by W. A. Mozart

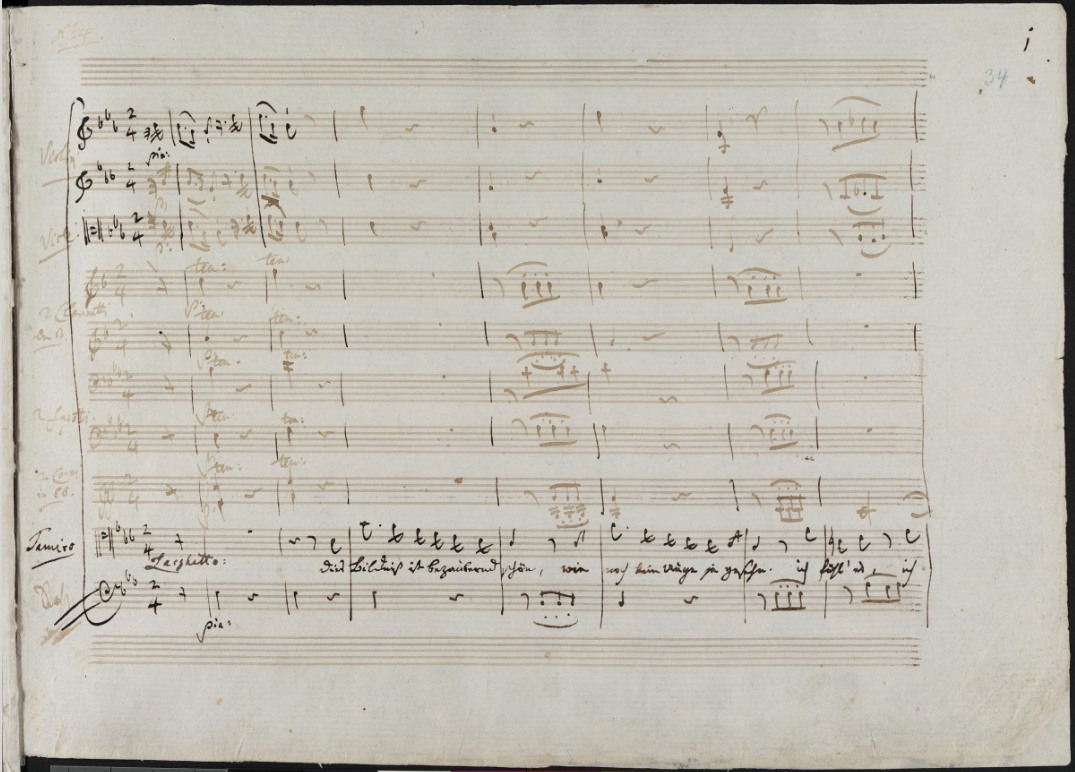
The first page of the aria in Mozart's hand, from 1791. Click to enlarge.

"Dies Bildnis ist bezaubernd schön" ("This image is enchantingly lovely") is an aria from Wolfgang Amadeus Mozart's 1791 opera The Magic Flute. The aria takes place in act 1, scene 1, of the opera. Prince Tamino has just been presented by the Three Ladies with an image of the princess Pamina, and falls instantly in love with her.

== Libretto ==
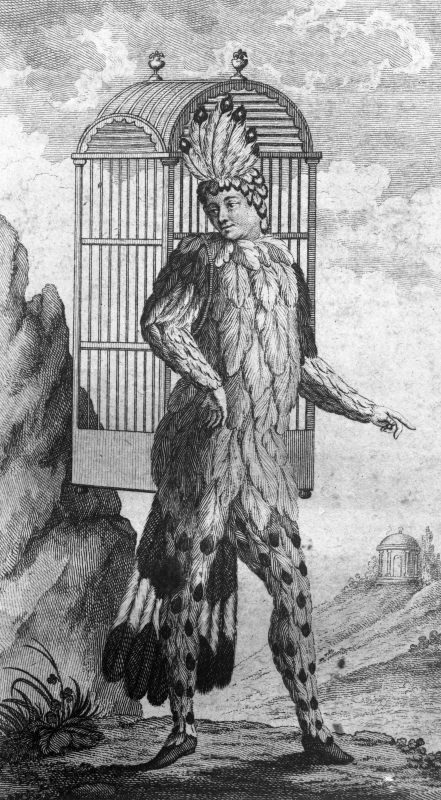
Schikaneder playing the role of Papageno in The Magic Flute. Engraving by Ignaz Alberti

The words of "Dies Bildnis" were written by Emanuel Schikaneder, a leading man of the theater in Vienna in Mozart's time, who wrote the libretto of the opera as well as running the troupe that premiered it and playing the role of Papageno. There are fourteen lines of poetry, which Peter Branscombe described as "a very tolerable sonnet."

Dies Bildnis ist bezaubernd schön,
wie noch kein Auge je gesehn!
Ich fühl' es, wie dies Götterbild,
mein Herz mit neuer Regung füllt.

Dies Etwas kann ich zwar nicht nennen,
doch fühl' ich's hier wie Feuer brennen,
soll die Empfindung Liebe sein?
Ja, ja, die Liebe ist's allein.

O wenn ich sie nur finden könnte,
O wenn sie doch schon vor mir stände,
ich würde, würde, warm und rein!
Was würde ich?

Ich würde sie voll Entzücken
an diesen heißen Busen drücken,
und ewig wäre sie dann mein.

This image is enchantingly lovely,
Like no eye has ever beheld!
I feel it as this divine picture,
Fills my heart with new emotion.

I cannot name my feeling,
Though I feel it burn like fire within me,
Could this feeling be love?
Yes! Yes! It is love alone.

Oh, if only I could find her,
Oh, if only she were already standing in front of me,
I'd become, become, warm and pure.
What would I do?

Upon this heart, Full of rapture,
I would press her to this glowing bosom,
And then she would be mine forever!

1953 recording
Ernst Haefliger, RIAS Symphony Orchestra, Ferenc Fricsay

The metre is iambic tetrameter, which is the metre Schikaneder used throughout most of The Magic Flute. The stanzaic form and rhyme scheme involve two quatrains followed by two rhymed tercets, thus: [AABB] [CCDD] [EEF] [GGF].

The third to last line of the text, "Was würde ich? Ich würde sie voll Entzücken", is not a well-formed iambic tetrameter line, and perhaps reflects a textual change by Mozart, who places a dramatic full-measure pause after Tamino's self-directed question.

David Freedberg offers an appreciation of Schikaneder's text; it "describes in extraordinary detail something of the mental movements that one can imagine accompanying the revelation of the picture. Tamino's heart is stirred, and then more powerfully so; he cannot name the emotion, he calls it love. Thus identified, the sentiment grows stronger; he moves from beautiful picture to the beautiful woman represented on it. Tamino is overwhelmed with a sense of her potential presence, her potential liveliness. He speaks of pressing her to his breast, and he wants to possess her forever."

== Music ==
This published version of the aria gives a piano reduction instead of the orchestral score; it is intended for practice and economical public performance. The music offers a Ukrainian translation as well as the original German.

The aria is scored for modest forces: two clarinets in B♭, two bassoons, two horns in E♭, the usual string section, and the tenor soloist.

Mozart's musical setting mostly follows the scheme of Schikaneder's poem. There is an opening section in E♭ corresponding to the first quatrain, a modulation to the dominant key of B♭ for the second quatrain, a chromatic and modulating passage for the first tercet, and a return to E♭ for the last.

Both Branscombe and Kalkavage have suggested that Mozart's arrangement of keys embodies a variety of sonata form, with the standard elements of exposition, development, and recapitulation. Thus, in the first two quatrains the music sets forth the tonic key and moves to the dominant (exposition); the exploration of a variety of keys in the first tercet forms a development; and the reassertion of the tonic in the second tercet forms a recapitulation. Branscombe calls the latter a "vestigial recapitulation", since only some of the material of the exposition (in particular, not the opening) is repeated there.

The orchestra for the most part plays a discreet accompaniment to the soloist. There is a solo for the clarinets between the first and second quatrains, and the first violins play a thirty-second note motif, evoking Tamino's surging emotions, in the third section.

Kölsch suggests that the orchestra repeatedly portrays Tamino's thoughts just before he sings them aloud; for example, just after Tamino has sung the line "Soll die Empfindung Liebe sein?" ("Could this feeling be love?"), the clarinets and bassoons twice play the answer to him, "Ja, ja", which Tamino then sings in the same rhythm.

The key of the aria is E♭ major. This is the home key of The Magic Flute (the opera begins and ends in this key), but this may have nothing to do with Mozart's key choice. Branscombe suggests instead that Mozart tailored the music (his normal practice) to the singer who premiered it, his friend the composer/tenor Benedikt Schack, specifically setting the key so that the conspicuous high note to which the first syllable of "Bildnis" is sung would be Schack's high G: "For Tamino's glorious outburst at the opening of the Bildnis aria his top note had to be G – and that automatically made for an aria in E♭." For more on Schack's high G, see below.

== Sources ==
Branscombe suggested that Schikaneder drew on a particular source, the fairy tale "Neangir und seine Brüder" ("Neangir and his brothers"), part of a compilation of stories called Dschinnistan created by Christoph Martin Wieland. Neangir, a young man sent to Constantinople to seek his fortune, is taken into the home of a friendly stranger, who plies him with a magic elixir and shows him a picture of his beautiful lost daughter Argentine. Neangir immediately falls in love with her, is promised her hand in marriage, and agrees to rescue her. Branscombe suggests Schikaneder borrowed several words from the "Neangir" text: "Bildnis", "Herz", "Regung", "Feuer" (in the sense of burning emotions), "Liebe", and "Entzücken". For further details on this work, and its prominence in Schikaneder's Vienna, see Libretto of The Magic Flute.

According to Simon Keefe, the striking opening notes of the singer's part were inspired by an earlier aria, "Welch' fremde Stimme", composed by Benedikt Schack for the collectively-created opera Der Stein der Weisen ("The philosopher's stone"). The resemblance is hardly likely to be accidental, since Mozart himself contributed music to the same opera, which was in the repertory of Schikaneder's company prior to The Magic Flute. Der Stein der Weisen was in many respects a rough draft for The Magic Flute (Keefe), and the device of having tenor Schack begin a lyric aria with "a soaring high G that immediately descends in scalar motion" might be regarded as having passed its tryout in Der Stein der Weisen.

== Criticism and commentary ==
Hermann Abert offered background to the work thus: it "deals with a theme familiar not only from fairytales but also from French and German comic operas, namely the love of a mere portrait, a true fairytale miracle that music alone can turn into a real-life experience." Abert goes on to contrast Tamino's love with that of other male characters in Mozart opera:

Few, if any, experiences lend themselves to musical treatment as much as the mysterious burgeoning of love in a young heart. It was an experience that already preoccupied Mozart's attentions in the case of Cherubino. Now, of course, we are no longer dealing with an adolescent but with an already mature young man. Moreover, Tamino does not experience love as a state of turmoil in which all his senses are assaulted, as is the case with Count Almaviva, for example, but nor is it a magic force that paralyses all his energies, as it does with Don Ottavio. Rather, it is with reverent awe that he feels the unknown yet divine miracle burgeoning within him. From the outset, this lends his emotions a high degree of moral purity and prevents him from becoming sentimental.

Grout and Weigel Williams suggest that the opening notes of "Dies Bildnis" spill over into other numbers of The Magic Flute: "The opening phrase of 'Dies Bildnis ist bezaubernd schön' turns up at a half-dozen unexpected places in the second finale. These and similar melodic remembrances are not to be regarded as leitmotifs in the Wagnerian sense but as partly unconscious echoes of musical ideas that were in Mozart's mind throughout the composition of the opera." One such echo has been repeatedly noted: the phrase to which Pamina sings the words "Tamino mein! O welch ein Glück!" ("My Tamino! Oh what happiness!") when she and Tamino are reunited shortly before their trials of fire and water. Various other instances have been pointed out by Kölsch, Abert, and Assmann.

Though repeated elsewhere, the opening notes of "Dies Bildnis" do not recur in the aria itself. Spike Hughes writes, "That rapt opening phrase does not occur again in this aria, and so has a remarkable effect of expressing that unforgettable but unrepeatable moment of love at first sight."

== Notes ==
=== Sources ===
- Abert, Anna Amalie (1965–66). "Bedeutungswandel eines Mozartschen Lieblingsmotivs" [Changes in the meaning of a favorite motif of Mozart]. Mozart-Jahrbuch (in German). pp. 7–14.
- Abert, Hermann (2007) [1920]. Cliff Eisen (ed.). W. A. Mozart. Translated by Stewart Spencer. New Haven: Yale University Press.
- Assmann, Jan (2006). "Pathosformeln, Figuren, und Erinnerungsmotive in Mozart's Zauberflöte". In Herbert Lachmayer [in German] (ed.). Mozart. Experiment Aufklärung im Wien des ausgehenden 18. Jahrhunderts (PDF) (in German). Ostfildern: Hatje Cantz Verlag. pp. 781–789. ISBN 3775716688.
- Branscombe, Peter (1991). W. A. Mozart: Die Zauberflöte. Cambridge Opera Handbooks. Cambridge: Cambridge University Press.
- Cairns, David (2006). Mozart and His Operas. Berkeley, Los Angeles: University of California Press. p. 217.
- Freedberg, David (2013). "Arousal by image". In Bill Beckley (ed.). Uncontrollable Beauty: Toward a New Aesthetics. Skyhorse Publishing.
- Grout, Donald Jay; Weigel Williams, Hermine (2003). A Short History of Opera (4th ed.). New York: Columbia University Press.
- Hughes, Spike (1972). Famous Mozart Operas: An Analytical Guide for the Opera-goer and Armchair Listener. Courier Corporation. p. 201. ISBN 9780486228587.
- Kalkavage, Peter (2005). "Passion and perception in Mozart's The Magic Flute". St. John's Review. 53 (2): 38–67.
- Keefe, Simon P. (2003). The Cambridge Companion to Mozart. Cambridge: Cambridge University Press.
- Kölsch, Hanskarl (2009). Mozart: Die Rätsel seiner Zauberflöte [Mozart: The puzzle of his Magic Flute] (in German). Norderstedt: Books on Demand.
