= Bjørn Talén =

Norwegian opera singer

Bjørn Talén (8 September 1890 – 12 July 1945) was a Norwegian opera singer (tenor).

== Biography ==
Bjørn Talén was born in Kristiania (Oslo). His parents were Constantin Waldemar Talén (1857–1902) and Maren Johanne Johnsen (1867–1920). His father was an engineer who became director of the Oslo Tramway. His parents were both art and theater enthusiasts and knew many of the contemporary artist. He took his final exams at the Oslo Cathedral School in 1908 he took the 1910 science matriculation at Halling school. He graduated from the Norwegian Military Academy in 1913. He subsequently studied singing in Milan, Naples, London and Paris.

He debuted in the Aula at the University of Oslo in October 1914. From 1918–20, he was with the Opera Comique in Oslo. From 1921 to 1928 he was employed as the first tenor at the Berlin State Opera and continued until 1932 at the Städtische Oper in Berlin. He appeared at the National Theatre and at The Royal Swedish Opera in Stockholm, and he had guest appearances in Copenhagen, Turin, Madrid, Berlin and Dresden.

Notable grand operas he was associated with included Tannhäuser by Richard Wagner and Faust by Charles Gounod. He appeared as Don José in Carmen, Cavaradossi in Tosca, Pinkerton in Madama Butterfly, Samson in Samson and Delilah by Camille Saint-Saëns, Rudolpho in La bohème, Manrico in Il trovatore, Canio in Pagliacci and Dick Johnson in La fanciulla del West. In Norway, he frequently appeared in more operetta-like productions, such as Das Land des Lächelns by Franz Lehár.

Bjørn Talén had military training and reached the rank of captain. With the German invasion of Norway in 1940, he was chief of air defence at Kongsvinger Fortress in Hedmark, Norway.

== Recordings ==
Four of Talén's recordings (Die Zauberflöte: Dies Bildnis ist bezaubernd schön, Der Barbier von Bagdad: So leb' ich noch...Vor deinem Fenster die Blumen, Aida: Già i sacerdoti adunansi . . . Ah! tu dei vivere!, The Tales of Hoffmann: Il était une fois) are published on Four Scandinavian Tenors of the Past.

== Personal life ==
He was married in 1913 to Annie Sofie Olsen (1885–1964), the daughter of shipping magnate Thomas Frederick Olsen. The marriage was dissolved in 1937. In 1938, he married Cecilie Schou (1890–1976), the daughter of the factory owner Christian Julius Schou.

== Hågå Gård ==
In 1937, Bjørn Talén and Cecilie Schou bought Hågå Gård, popularly known as the Per Gynt farm. The historic farm is located on a hillside in Nord-Fron Municipality, part of the traditional region of Gudbrandsdal. Bjørn Talén died of cancer in 1945 during a hospital stay in Bergen. The farm has since then been owned by members of his family.
