= Johann Baptist Henneberg =

Austrian composer and pianist (1768–1822)

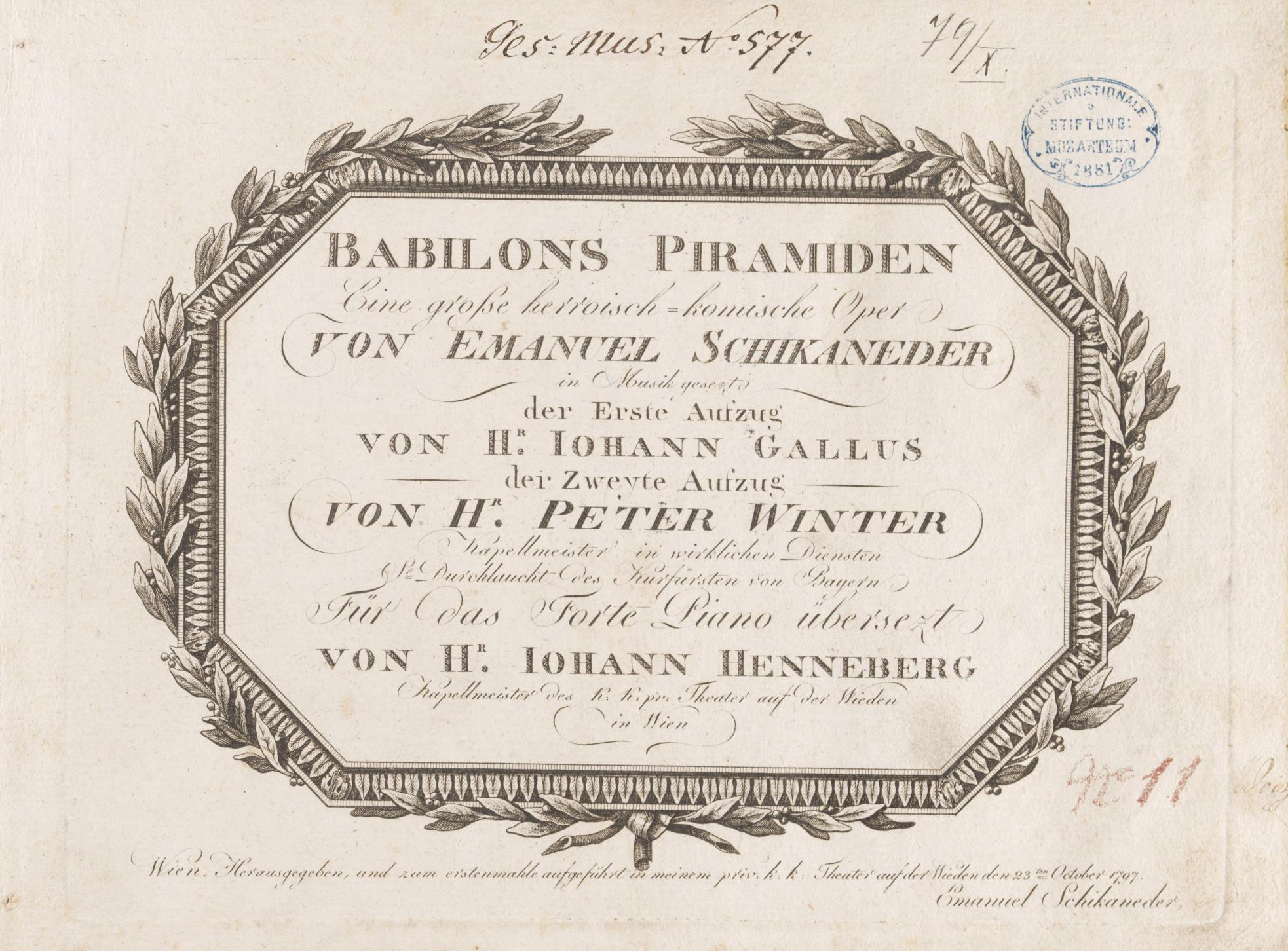
Titelseite des Klavierauszuges von Henneberg zur Oper "Babilons Piramiden"

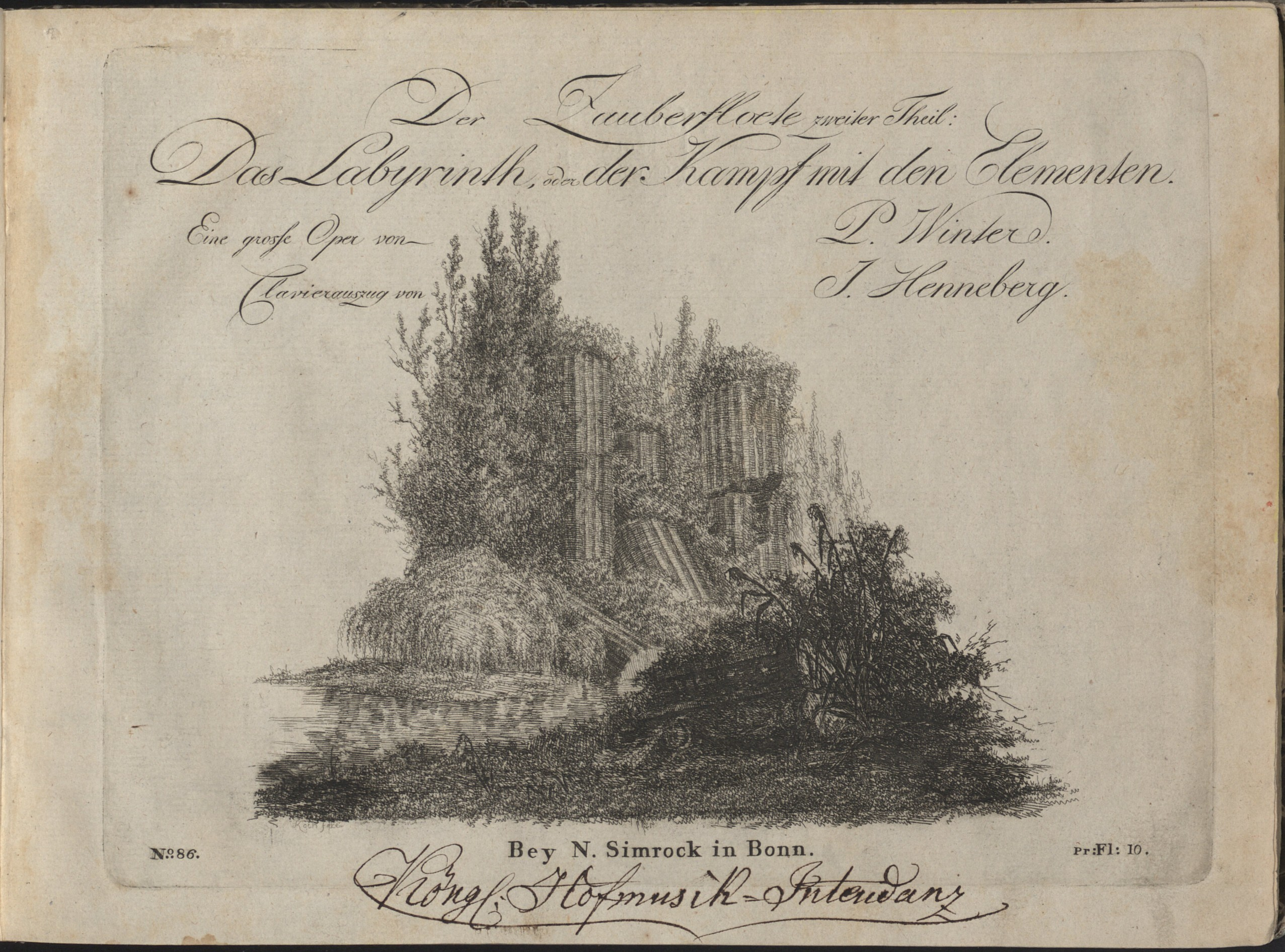
cover of vocal score by Johann Baptist Henneberg of opera Das Labyrinth

Johann Baptist Henneberg (5 December 1768 – 27 November 1822) was an Austrian composer, pianist, organist and Kapellmeister.

== Career ==
Born in Vienna, Henneberg was Kapellmeister from 1790 to 1801 at the Theater auf der Wieden, then until 1803 at the Theater an der Wien. Later he was employed as an organist by the prince Nikolaus II, Prince Esterházy in Eisenstadt, where he also conducted opera performances. From 1814, Henneberg was choir master at the Augustinian Church, Vienna, and from 1818 to 1822 organist in the Imperial court orchestra, the Wiener Hofmusikkapelle.

Henneberg played a decisive role in the rehearsal of Mozart's opera The Magic Flute. After Mozart himself conducted the premiere on 30 September and 1 October 1791, Henneberg conducted the following performances. Henneberg also created several operas himself, which enjoyed great popularity at the time.

In 1797 he composed together with Ludwig van Beethoven menuets and allemandes for a mask ball of the Pension Society for Performing Artists, which was performed on 26 November 1797 in the Großer Redoutensaal of the Vienna Hofburg.

Henneberg died in 1822 in Vienna, aged 53.

== Work (operas) ==
- Der Stein der Weisen, with Benedikt Schack, Franz Xaver Gerl, Emanuel Schikaneder and Wolfgang Amadeus Mozart, premiered 11 September 1790 in Theater auf der Wieden (and also produced by Bampton Classical Opera in 2002)
- Der redliche Landmann, 1792
- Der wohltätige Derwisch, 1793
- Die Eisenkönigin, 1793
- Die Waldmänner, 1793
- Der Scherenschleifer, 1795
- Das Jägermädchen, 1798
- Konrad Langbart von Friedburg, 1799
- Mina und Peru, 1799
