= Joseph Caché =

Austrian opera singer

Joseph Caché (26 August 1770 – 26 January 1841) was an Austrian operatic tenor, stage actor and writer.

== Life ==
Born in Vienna, Caché first belonged to the ensemble of the Theater auf der Wieden and from January 1802 to the Theater an der Wien. There he stood among other things on 10 November 1804 at the premiere of Salieri's opera Die Neger as John on stage; at the premiere of the first version of Beethoven's opera Fidelio on 20 November 1805 he performed the role of porter Jaquino.

Ignaz Franz Castelli writes that Caché was a good actor, "who sometimes had to be used in opera, too, because director Meyer knew quite well that in comic opera a good play often works better than a good voice. His singing parts usually had to be played before he was allowed to rehearse." From 1814 to 31 March 1831 he was a member of the Vienna Court Theatres. Besides he also appeared as a stage poet.

His flat was last on the Wieden No. 12 in Vienna, where he died on 26 January 1841 at the age of 71 "from exhaustion".

== Work ==
- Seelen-Adel. Ein Schauspiel in zwey Aufzügen, Vienna: Anton Strauß 1805
- Das Hauptquartier. Ein militärisches Schauspiel in vier Akten, Vienna: Wallishausser 1807
