= Boston Baroque =

Boston Baroque is the oldest permanent period instrument orchestra in North America. It was founded in 1973 by the American harpsichordist and conductor, Martin Pearlman, to present concerts of the Baroque and Classical repertoire on period instruments, drawing on the insights of the historical performance movement.

The Boston Baroque professional chamber chorus was established as an integral part of the ensemble in 1981.

With Pearlman as its music director, the ensemble presented an annual subscription concert series in Greater Boston, Massachusetts; performed on tour in Carnegie Hall, Chicago's Shubert Theatre, Los Angeles's Disney Hall, at the Ravinia and Tanglewood festivals, and toured internationally. Pearlman retired as music director at the end of the 2024-25 season. The French conductor, Marc Minkowski, was appointed the new music director of Boston Baroque in April 2026 and will take over leadership in the 2026-2027 season.

The orchestra, originally named "Banchetto Musicale", was renamed Boston Baroque in 1992, when Telarc Records, in its first commitment to a period-instrument orchestra, signed the ensemble to produce a series of recordings of major Baroque and Classical repertoire for international commercial distribution. In 2012, Boston Baroque became the first American orchestra to record with the highly-regarded UK audiophile label, Linn Records. Boston Baroque’s 26 acclaimed commercial recordings are frequently heard by millions on classical radio stations in North America and Europe, as well as on Boston Baroque Radio, Boston Baroque’s streaming channel. Boston Baroque’s recordings have received six GRAMMY® Award Nominations: its 1992 release of Handel’s Messiah, 1998 release of Monteverdi’s Vespers of 1610, 2000 release of Bach’s Mass in B Minor, 2014 release of Monteverdi’s Il Ritorno d’Ulisse in patria (two nominations), and 2017 release of Biber’s Mystery Sonatas.

== Notable performances ==
- Boston's period-instrument premiere of Handel's Messiah in 1981.
- American premiere of the opera Zoroastre by Jean-Philippe Rameau in 1983.
- Boston's first period-instrument performances of the complete concertos of Johann Sebastian Bach in 1984-1985 to mark Bach's Tercentenary.
- American period-instrument premiere of Mozart's Don Giovanni, broadcast nationally on public radio in 1986.
- American period-instrument premiere of Beethoven's Seventh Symphony and Violin Concerto in 1987-88.
- Boston's period-instrument premiere of Joseph Haydn’s The Creation in 1989.
- Modern world premiere of Der Stein der Weisen (The Philosopher's Stone) in 1998, a Singspiel collaboratively written by members of Mozart's circle--with the likely participation of Mozart himself--which sheds new light on the composition of The Magic Flute one year later.
- Boston's first complete cycle of the three surviving Monteverdi operas (semi-staged in 2001-2003) with new performing versions of L'incoronazione di Poppea and Il ritorno d'Ulisse in patria written by Martin Pearlman.
- Boston Baroque's European debut, performing Handel's Messiah in Kraków and Warsaw, Poland in 2003.
- Boston Baroque's tour of the Monteverdi Vespers of 1610 to Walt Disney Concert Hall in Los Angeles, and the summer music festivals at Ravinia and Tanglewood in 2004.
- First professional Boston performances of Luigi Cherubini's Requiem in C minor in 2005, a neglected work highly praised by leading composers of the day and favorably compared with Mozart's Requiem.
- Return to the Ludwig Van Beethoven Easter Festival in Poland in 2015, performing Monteverdi’s Vespers of 1610 and Handel’s Messiah.
- Boston period instrument premiere of Beethoven’s Fidelio in 2018.
- Debut of Boston Baroque channel on Amazon Prime in 2020, bringing full-length concert and opera performances to a global audience.

== Notable recordings ==
Boston Baroque has performed and recorded period-instrument performances of Bach's Brandenburg Concertos, Handel's Messiah, Purcell's Dido and Æneas, Monteverdi Vespers of 1610, Bach's Mass in B minor, Handel's Concerti Grossi, Op. 6, Gluck's Iphigénie en Tauride, Mozart's The Impresario and Mozart's Circle's The Beneficent Dervish, Handel's Music for Royal Fireworks and Water Music, Bach: The Complete Orchestral Suites, Mozart: Flute Concertos and Symphony No. 41 "Jupiter", Vivaldi's Gloria, Bach's Magnificat, Cherubini's Requiem in C minor (1816) and March funèbre (1820), Beethoven's Elegiac Song (Elegischer Gesang), Op. 118, Handel’s Concerti Grossi, Vivaldi’s The Four Seasons, Haydn’s The Creation and Lord Nelson Mass, Monteverdi’s Il Ritorno D’Ulisse in Patria, and Biber’s The Mystery Sonatas.

Boston Baroque has received the following Grammy nominations

- Handel’s Messiah, Telarc, 1992: Best Performance of a Choral Work
- Monteverdi’s Vespers of 1610, Telarc, 1998: Best Performance of a Choral Work
- Bach’s Mass in B Minor, Telarc, 2000: Best Performance of a Choral Work
- Monteverdi’s Il Ritorno d’Ulisse in patria, Linn Records, 2015: Best Opera Recording)
- Monteverdi’s Il Ritorno d’Ulisse in patria, 2015: Best Engineered Album, Classical
- Biber’s The Mystery Sonatas, Linn Records, 2018: Best Classical Instrumental Solo

Notable premiere recordings by Boston Baroque include:

- First period instrument recording of Mozart's Requiem Mass in D minor (Telarc) in the completion by Robert D. Levin, in which Levin addresses the issues of instrumentation, grammar and structure raised by the traditional Sussmayr completion.
- Lost Music of Early America, the first and sole professional CD recording (Telarc, 1998) of American Moravian Church music—the first early American classical music. Martin Pearlman researched the music at the Moravian Music Foundation in Salem, North Carolina, and chose and arranged the hymns into patterns appropriate for the Moravian Lovefeast or Liebesmahl, primarily a song service with hymns, psalms and anthems. Included are Lovefeasts for Christmas, Lent and Thanksgiving.
- The Philosopher's Stone, (Der Stein der Weisen), 1790, a collaboratively composed Singspiel with a story based on the same set of fairy-tales from which The Magic Flute was drawn, which attracted renewed attention in 1996, when musicologist David J. Buch discovered a previously unknown copy. Besides numerous correlations with Mozart’s final operatic work, The Magic Flute, which was written for the same company a year later, this copy of The Philosopher’s Stone suggested the likelihood of Mozart's participation in the composition of more of the music than had been previously thought. Boston Baroque was chosen by David J. Buch to give the modern-day world premiere of The Philosopher's Stone. The work was presented in concert form in Boston's Jordan Hall (1999) and recorded for Telarc.
- First period instrument recording (Telarc, 2007) of Luigi Cherubini's long neglected Requiem in C minor, which premiered on January 21, 1817, in a memorial concert below the abbey church of St. Denis to commemorate the anniversary of the executions of Louis XVI and Marie Antoinette. Though held in the highest esteem by Beethoven, Brahms, Berlioz and Wagner, and performed widely in its own day, the piece fell into obscurity along with most of Cherubini's output by the end of the 19th century.
- First period instrument recording of Mozart's Der Schauspieldirektor (Telarc, 2002).

== Collaborations ==
- Boston Baroque performed with Mark Morris and the Mark Morris Dance Group in five performances of Henry Purcell's Dido and Æneas, in Chicago and Ann Arbor, in 1996.
- Boston Baroque performed Boston's first fully staged production of Alceste by Christoph Willibald Gluck in a co-production with Opera Boston at the Cutler Majestic Theatre in 2005
- Boston Baroque performed Handel's Semele, in a fully staged production with Opera Boston at the Cutler Majestic Theatre in February 2008.
