= Bampton Classical Opera =

Opera company based in Bampton, Oxfordshire, UK

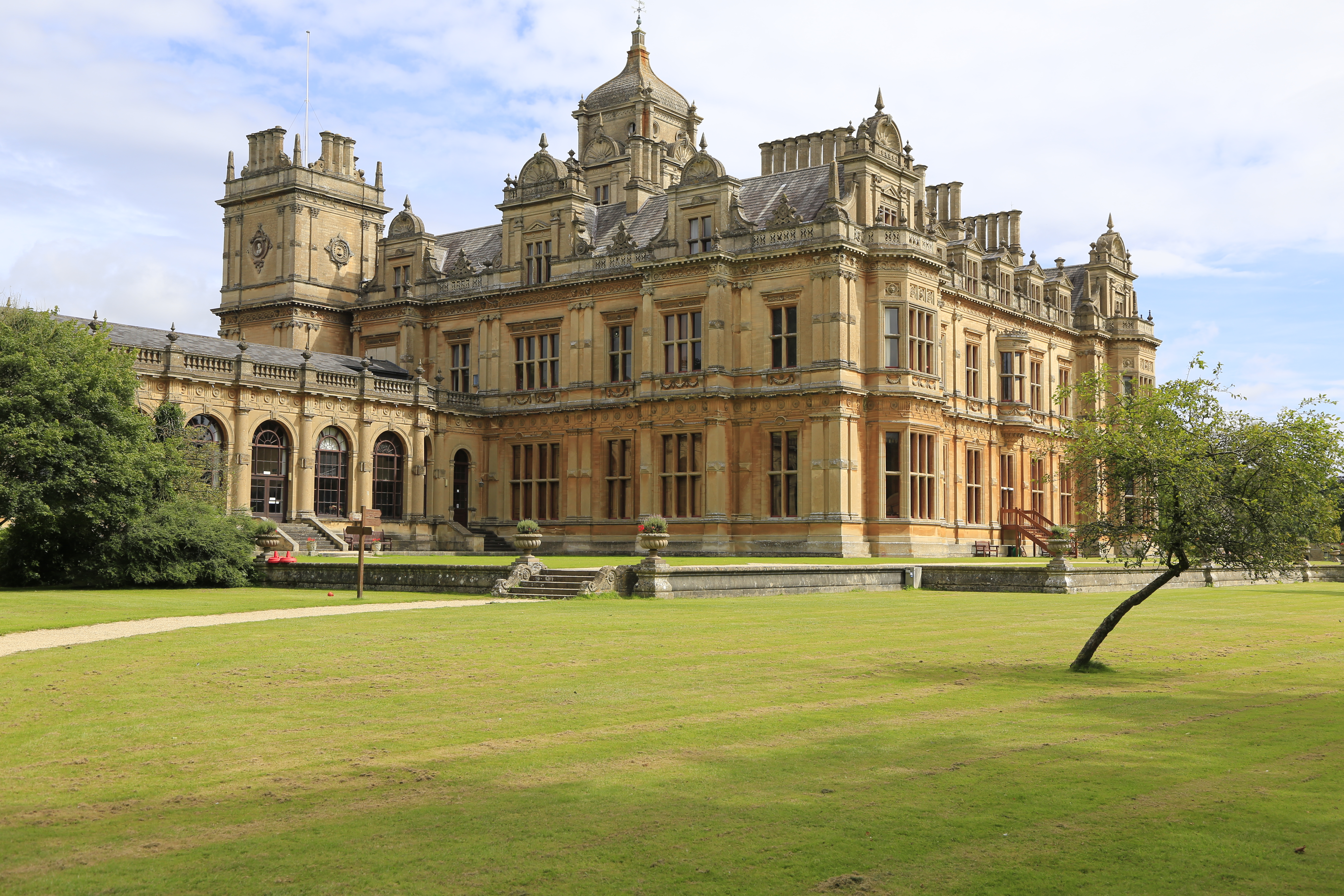
Westonbirt House, one of Bampton Classical Opera's main performing venues

Bampton Classical Opera is an opera company based in Bampton, Oxfordshire and founded in 1993. It specialises in the production of lesser known opera from the Classical period. Performances are always sung in English. Opera today called the company 'ambitious, innovative and imaginative'.

It works with a variety of conductors and ensembles and does not have a permanent music director. It performs with both modern and period instrument orchestras and has often appeared with the London Mozart Players and Chroma Ensemble. It particularly aims to provide performances for young singers.

== History ==
Bampton Classical Opera was founded in 1993 by its current artistic directors, Gilly French and Jeremy Gray. Following a staging of Mozart’s rare unfinished opera L’oca del Cairo (The Cairo Goose) in 1994, the company specialised increasingly in rare works of the classical period, usually from the second half of the eighteenth-century.

== Venues ==
The company's staged opera productions are performed in a garden setting in Bampton and at Westonbirt House, the premises of Westonbirt School, as well as at St John's, Smith Square, London.

From time to time it tours to other UK venues and festivals, which have included the Wigmore Hall and the Purcell Room in London, the Buxton Festival, the Cheltenham Music Festival and others. In addition, occasional concerts are performed including an annual one in St Mary’s Church, Bampton usually on 21 December, with other concerts in Oxford and London.

== 2022 Production ==
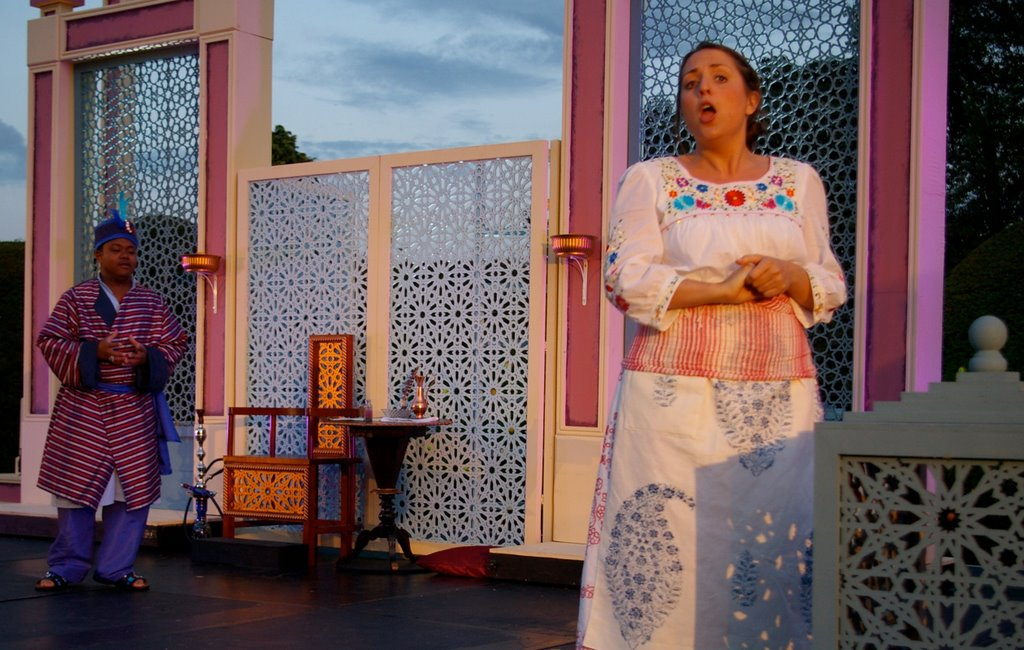
John-Colyn Gyeantey (the Count) and Emily Rowley Jones (Susanna) in the UK première of Marcos Portugal's Marriage of Figaro, Bampton 2010

In summer 2022, the company will perform "Fool Moon", a new English translation of Il mondo della luna by Haydn

== Other productions from 2000 ==
In 2021 The company gave a concert performance of The Crown by C W Gluck.

In summer 2021 the company performed Paris and Helen by Gluck, the 2020 performances having been postponed.

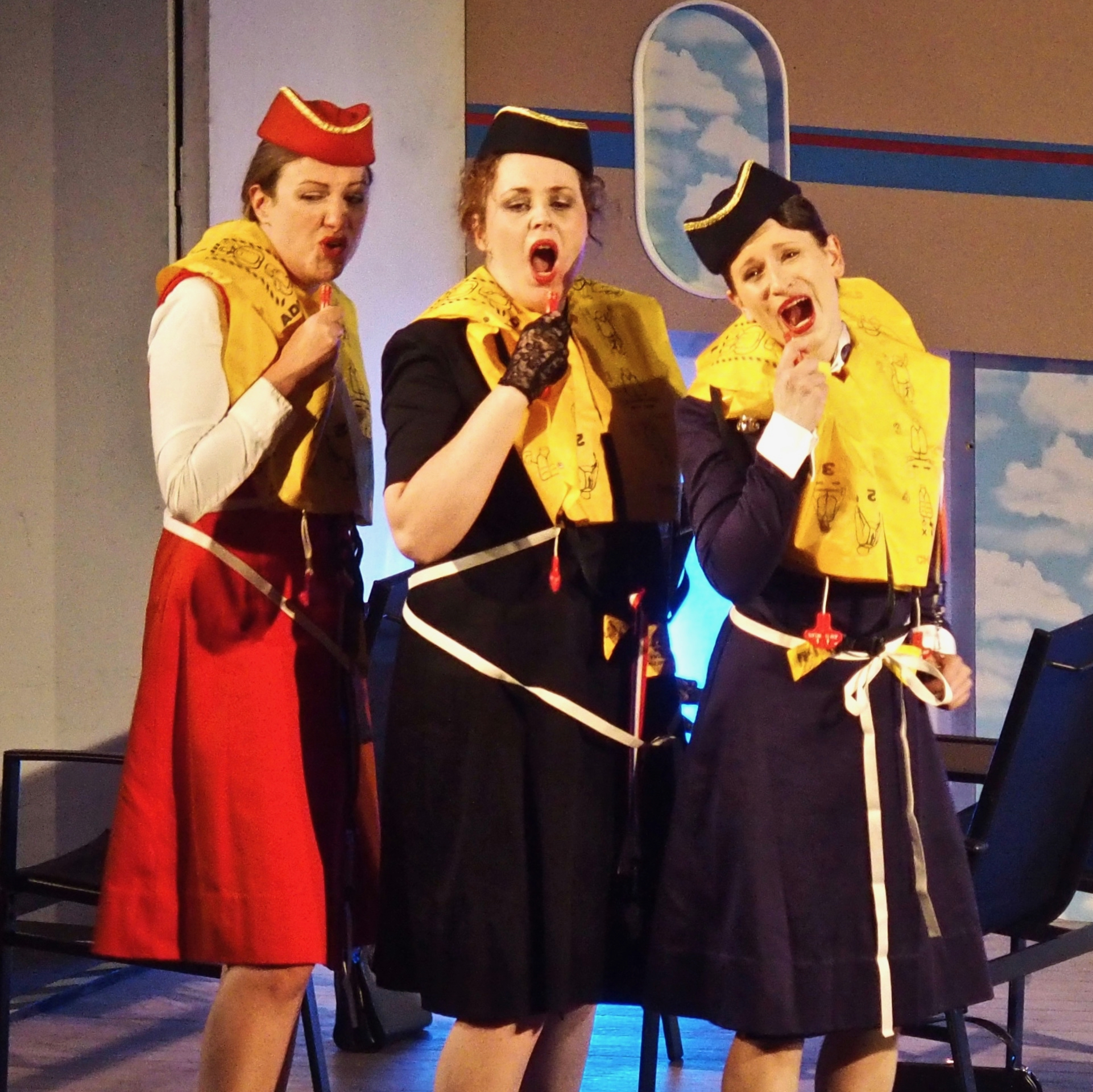
Catherine Backhouse (Pallas Athena), Aoife O'Sullivan (Venus), Barbara Cole Walton (Juno) in the 2016 production of Thomas Arne's Judgement of Paris

In 2000 Bampton Classical Opera performed Stephen Storace’s The Comedy of Errors, with libretto by Lorenzo da Ponte. In 2001, it performed the United Kingdom staged première of The Philosopher's Stone (Der Stein der Weisen), a singspiel by Emanuel Schikaneder composed in collaboration with Mozart, Henneberg, Schack, and Gerl.

== Productions before 2000 ==
In 2003, it gave the first UK performance of Salieri's Falstaff, and in July 2007 staged the UK première of Georg Benda's Romeo and Juliet. In 2008 it presented the UK première of Leonora by Ferdinando Paer, based on the same story as Fidelio, and in 2009 Le Pescatrici (The Fisherwomen) by Haydn. In 2010, it presented Marcos Portugal's The Marriage of Figaro (1799), the first performances anywhere since its première in Venice in 1800, and The Masque of King Alfred and The Judgement of Paris by Thomas Arne. In 2011, it presented the UK concert première of Il parnaso confuso (Parnassus in Turmoil) by Gluck; The Italian Girl in London (L'italiana in Londra) by Cimarosa, first performed in 1778; and The Choice of Hercules by Handel. In 2012, it presented productions of L'amant jaloux (The Jealous Lover) by André Grétry (1778) and Blaise le savetier (Blaise the Cobbler) (1759) by François-André Danican Philidor. In 2013, it presented a new production of Mozart’s first comic opera, La finta semplice (1769), in a new English translation entitled Pride and Pretence. In 2014, it revisited La finta semplice and Gluck's Il parnaso confuso, as well as presenting Orfeo by Ferdinando Bertoni, a modern times UK première. In 2015, Bampton Classical Opera performed Salieri's Trofonio's Cave. In 2016, it staged a double bill called the Divine Comedies featuring Arne's The Judgement of Paris and, a UK première, Gluck's Philemon and Baucis - an English translation of part two of Le feste d'Apollo. In 2017, it presented the UK modern times première of The School of Jealousy by Salieri. In 2018, it presented another UK première, Isouard's Cinderella. In 2019, it performed Bride and Gloom (Gli sposi malcontenti) by Stephen Storace in an English translation by Brian Trowell. This was the second ever UK production, and it has led to Bampton Classical Opera being selected as a Finalist in the Rediscovered Work category of the International Opera Awards 2020.

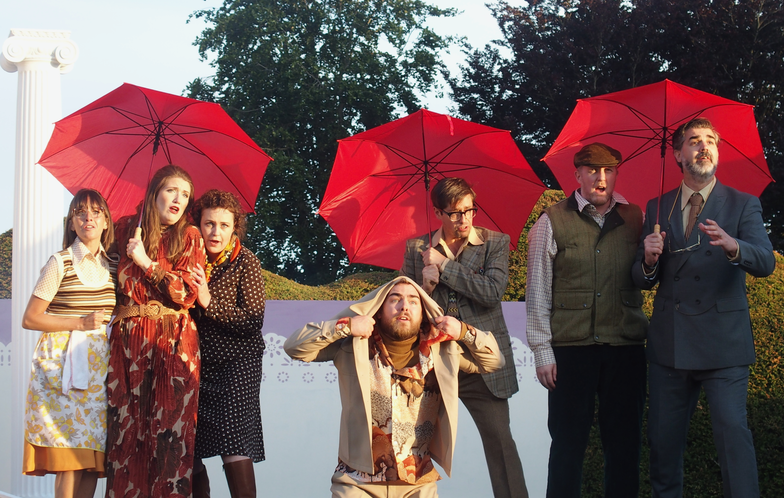
Stephen Storace's Gli sposi malcontenti, 2019 performance (as Bride & Gloom)

== Performers ==
Many musicians of national and international significance have performed with Bampton early in their careers. These include conductors Thomas Blunt, Alexander Briger, Christian Curnyn, Edward Gardner, Robin Newton and Julian Perkins, directors Harry Fehr, Thomas Guthrie and Alessandro Talevi, and singers Rebecca Bottone, Ilona Domnich, Alessandro Fisher, Maire Flavin, Martene Grimson, Benjamin Hulett, Gillian Keith, Andrew Kennedy, Christopher Lowrey, Gavan Ring, Kim Sheehan, Christopher Turner, Mark Wilde and many others.

== Young Singers' Competition ==
To celebrate its 20th anniversary and to give further support to the development of young singers, it launched a biennial Young Singers’ Competition in 2013, with the public final in Oxford’s Holywell Music Room.

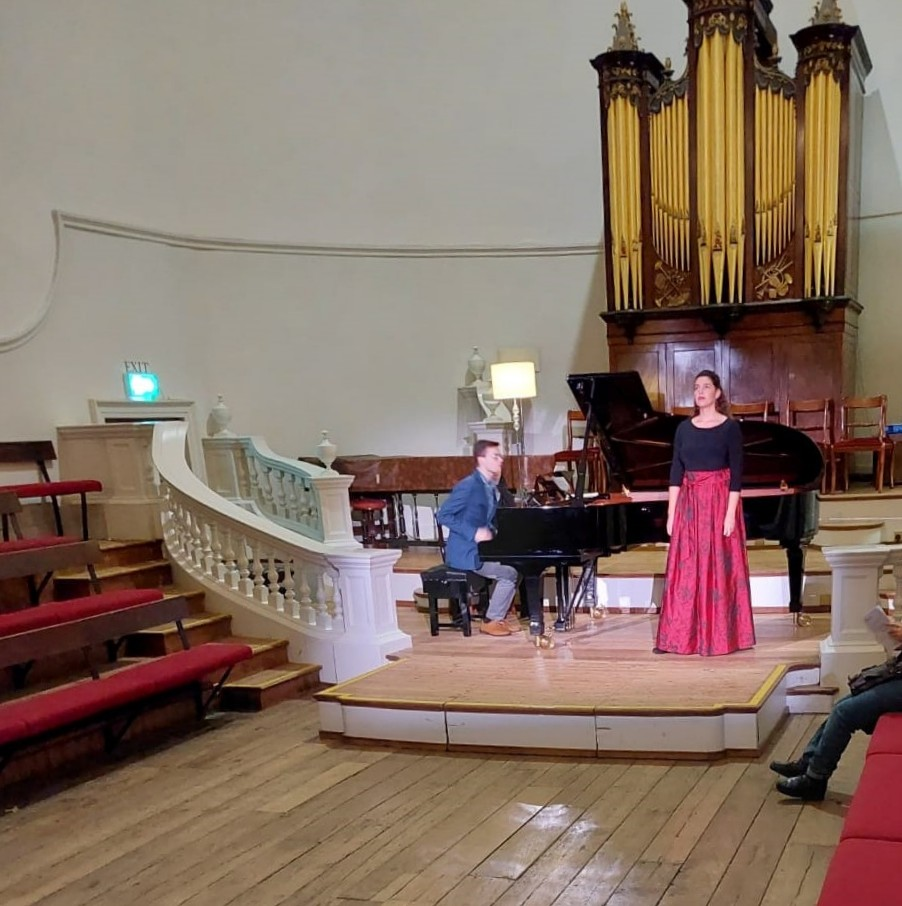
A singer and her accompanist competing in the final round of Bampton Classical Opera's Young Singers' Competition in December 2021 in the Holywell Music Room

First prize winners have been Ukrainian mezzo-soprano Anna Starushkevych (2013), Russian soprano Galina Averina (2015), British mezzo-soprano Emma Stannard (2017) and British soprano Lucy Anderson (2019) and Australian soprano Cassandra Wright (2021). Accompanists’ prizes have been awarded to Keval Shah, Dylan Perez and Ilan Kurtser.

== Patrons ==
The company's patrons are Bonaventura Bottone, Brian Kay, Sir Roger Norrington, Andrew Parrott, Sir David Pountney, Sir Curtis Price and Jean Rigby. Dame Felicity Lott, the late Sir Charles Mackerras and the late Sir Philip Ledger were also patrons, as was the Rt Hon David Cameron, in whose former Witney constituency Bampton lies.
