= Eleonore Schikaneder =

Austrian stage actress and theatre manager

Eleonore Schikaneder (1751–1821) was an Austrian stage actress and theatre manager. She was the daughter of the theater manager Franz Josef Moser (1717–1792). She was married to the actor Emanuel Schikaneder (1751 - 1812). She worked for the company of Andreas Joseph Schopf in 1776–85 and at the Theater auf der Wieden in 1788. She managed her own company in 1785–88 and managed the Freihaustheater in Vienna in 1788. She lived in the Holy Roman Empire and then the Austrian Empire.

In 2016, the musical Schikaneder by Stephen Schwartz and Christian Stuppeck and directed by Trevor Nunn, based on the premise that Die Zauberflöte sprang from Eleonore's tumultuous relationship with Schikaneder, debuted at the Raimund Theater.
