= David J. Buch =

American musicologist

- Born: 1950 (age 75–76); Detroit, Michigan
- Education: PhD Northwestern University
- Occupation: Musicologist
- Writing career
- Subjects: Musicology, Mozart scholarship
- Notable works: Der Stein der Weisen, Magic Flutes and Enchanted Forests: The Supernatural in the Eighteenth-Century Musical Theater
- Notable awards: Donald N. McKay Research Award

David Joseph Buch (born 1950) is an American musicologist.

== Life and career ==
Buch was born in Detroit and studied at the School of the Art Institute of Chicago and the Accademia Musicale Chigiana in Siena, Italy. He received his PhD in Music History from Northwestern University.

He had been Professor of Music at Wayne State University and Professor of Music History at the University of Northern Iowa (UNI), where he is Professor Emeritus. Buch was a visiting professor at the University of Chicago from 2008 until 2011. He has published numerous scholarly studies on a range of topics in music, having explored archives and libraries in many European cities.

His research has received international attention owing to the discovery of new attributions to Mozart in Emanuel Schikaneder's collaborative opera Der Stein der Weisen oder Die Zauberinsel (Vienna, 1790). His study of the theatrical tradition in which Mozart's The Magic Flute originated has led him to new interpretations of the libretto, notably skepticism to the widely held view that The Magic Flute is specifically a Masonic opera (see Libretto of The Magic Flute).

In 1998 he was named UNI Distinguished Scholar and received the Donald N. McKay Research Award.

Buch plays the lute, viola da gamba and guitar. He has performed with the Chicago Symphony Orchestra under Claudio Abbado, and as guest soloist with the Eckstein String Quartet (principals of the CSO). Buch also worked at Lyric Opera of Chicago, giving lectures, pre-opera talks, and hosting the Opera Insider Series.

== Selected bibliography ==
[Items available on Academia.edu and ResearchGate]

- (1983) “Two Likely Sources for Sor's Variations on a Theme by Mozart, Op. 9,” The Guitar Review 53, 6-9; revised as chapter 20 in Estudios sobre Fernando Sor, ed. Luis Gásser. Madrid: Instituto Complutense de Ciencias Musicales [2003], 353-7.
- (1985) "Style brisé, Style luthé, and the Choses luthées", The Musical Quarterly 71: 52–67.
- (1985) "The Influence of the Ballet de cour in the Genesis of the French Baroque Suite", Acta Musicologica 57: 94–109.
- (1989) "The Coordination of Text, Illustration, and Music in a Seventeenth-Century Lute Manuscript: La Rhétorique des Dieux", Imago Musicae: International Yearbook of Musical Iconography.
- (1992) "Fairy-Tale Literature and Die Zauberflöte,” Acta Musicologica 64: 30–49.
- (1994) Dance Music from the Ballets de cour 1575–1651. Historical Commentary, Source Study, and Transcriptions from the Philidor Manuscripts. Stuyvesant, New York; Pendragon Press.
- (1996) "The Sources of Dance Music for the Ballets de cour before Lully", Revue de musicologie 82: 314–31.
- (1997) "Mozart and the Theater auf der Wieden: New attributions and perspectives", Cambridge Opera Journal 9: 195–232.
- (1999) "On the Context of Mozart's Variations on the Aria, 'Ein Weib ist das herrlichste Ding auf der Welt', K.613", Mozart-Jahrbuch 1999: 71–80.
- (2000) "Eighteenth-century Performing Materials from the Archive of the Theater an der Wien and Mozart's Die Zauberflöte,” The Musical Quarterly 84: 287–322.
- (2001) "Der Stein der Weisen, Mozart, and collaborative Singspiels at Emanuel Schikaneder's Theater auf der Wieden", Mozart-Jahrbuch 2000: 91–126.
- (2001) "Die Hauskomponisten am Theater auf der Wieden zur Zeit Mozarts (1798–1791)", Acta Mozartiana 48 1/4: 75–81.
- (2002) "Newly-Identified Engravings of Scenes from Emanuel Schickaneder's Theater auf der Wieden, 1789–1790, in the Allmanach für Theaterfreunde", Maske und Kothurn 48: 351–376.
- (2003) "Mozart's German Operas" (chapter 12), in The Cambridge Companion to Mozart, ed. Simon Keefe. Cambridge: 156–167.
- (2003) "Così fan tutte, La scuola degli amanti and L'ecole des amans", Hudební veda 38/3–4 (Festschrift Tomislav Volek): 313–320.
- (2004) "A Newly-Discovered Manuscript of Mozart's Die Zauberflöte from the Copy Shop of Emanuel Schikaneder's Theater auf der Wieden", Studia Musicologica 45: 269–279.
- (2004) "Die Zauberflöte, Masonic Opera, and Other Fairy Tales", Acta Musicologica 76/2:193–219, debunking many alleged masonic allusions.
- (2004) "The Don Juan Tradition, Eighteenth-Century Supernatural Theatre and Vincenzo Righini's Il convitato di pietra", Hudební veda 41/3–4: 295–302.
- (2005) "Three Posthumous Reports Concerning Mozart in his Late Viennese Years", Eighteenth-Century Music 2:125–129.
- (2007) with H. Worthen, "Ideology in Movement and a Movement in Ideology: The Deutsche Tanzfestspiele 1934 (9–16 December, Berlin)", Theatre Journal 59/2: 215–239.
- (2008) Magic Flutes and Enchanted Forests: The Supernatural in the Eighteenth-Century Musical Theater (University of Chicago Press)
- (2012) Representations of Jews in the Musical Theater of the Habsburg Empire 1788–1807 (Yuval Music Series 9), Jerusalem: The Jewish Music Research Centre.
- (2012) "Placidus Partsch, die Liedersammlung für Kinder und Kinderfreunde und die letzten drei Lieder Mozarts", Acta Mozartiana 59/1: 5–24.
- (2015) "Richard Strauss, Idomeneo and the Musical Mischling in the Third Reich", Richard Strauss-Jahrbuch 2014. Tutzing: Hans Schneider 2015: 67–84.
- (2015) "Emanuel Schikaneder as Theater Composer, or Who Wrote Papageno's Melodies in Die Zauberflöte?" Divadelní revue 26/2: 160–167.
- (2015-2016) "The Adventure in the Jewish Tavern: On the Theatrical Representation of Jewish and Slavic Music in the First Half of the Nineteenth Century. Min-Ad: Israel Studies in Musicology 13. http://www.biu.ac.il/hu/mu/min-ad/
- (2016) "Mozart's Bawdy Canons, Vulgarity, and Debauchery at the Wiednertheater", Eighteenth-Century Music 13/2:238–308.
- (2017) "Wolfgang Amadeus Mozart" (annotated bibliography), in Oxford Bibliographies in Music, ed. Bruce Gustafson. New York: Online only.
- (2020) "Concepción Gómez de Jacoby: Tárrega's Enigmatic Patron and Recuerdos de la Alhambra" Michael Lorenz (29 November)
- (2021)"On the Need for a Scholarly Edition of Tárrega’s Complete Works." Soundboard Scholar 7, (1). https://digitalcommons.du.edu/sbs/vol7/iss1/2
- (2023) "Dos conciertos de Francisco Tárrega en San Pol de Mar los años de 1893 y 1894," Guitarra.Artepulsado (15 May)
- (2022-2023) “Observaciones sobre arrastres, ligados, mordentes y mariposas,” Roseta. Revista de la Sociedad Española de la Guitarra 19-20, pp. 248-252. https://www.xn--sociedadespaoladelaguitarra-0uc.com/images/pdf/19_BUSCH.pdf English translation: https://www.academia.edu/144245436/Some_Observations_on_Slurred_Slides_Inverted_Mordants_and_Butterflies

== Editions ==
- (1990) Denis Gaultier, "La Rhétorique des dieux" (Recent Researches in the Music of the Baroque Era 62). Madison: A-R Editions, Inc. ISBN 0-89579-238-9.
- (2002) with Manuela Jahrmärker (ed.) Schikaneders heroisch-komische Oper Der Stein der Weisen – Modell für Mozarts Zauberflöte. Kritische Ausgabe des Textbuches, (Hainholz Musikwissenschaft 5), Göttingen. ISBN 3932622464.
- (2007) Der Stein der Weisen (full score), (Recent Researches in the Music of the Classic Era 76) Middleton. Wisconsin: A-R Editions. ISBN 0895796163.
- (2010) Der wohltätige Derwisch oder Die Schellenkappe (Vienna, 1791). (full score and piano-vocal score; RRMCE 81). Middleton, Wis.: A-R Ed. ISBN 0-89579-668-6.
- (2014) Franz Xaver Süßmayr, Der Spiegel von Arkadien (Vienna, 1794). (full score and piano-vocal score; RRMCE 93–94). Middleton, Wis.: A-R Ed. ISBN 0-89579-777-1.
- (2014) Mozart, Wanhal, Henneberg, Müller, et al., Liedersammlung für Kinder und Kinderfreunde (Vienna 1791). RRMCE 95. Middleton, Wis., A-R Ed. ISBN 978-0-89579-791-9.
- (2015) Two operas from the Series Die zween Anton. Part 1: Der dumme Gärtner aus dem Gebürge oder Die zween Anton (Vienna 1789). RRMCE 96. Middleton, Wis., A-R Ed. ISBN 978-0-89579-811-4.
- (2016) Two operas from the Series Die zween Anton. Part 2: Die verdeckten Sachen (Vienna 1789). RRMCE 98. Middleton, Wisconsin, A-R Ed. ISBN 978-0-89579-824-4.
