= Theater auf der Wieden =

Building in Vienna

Coordinates: 48°11′52″N 16°21′58″E

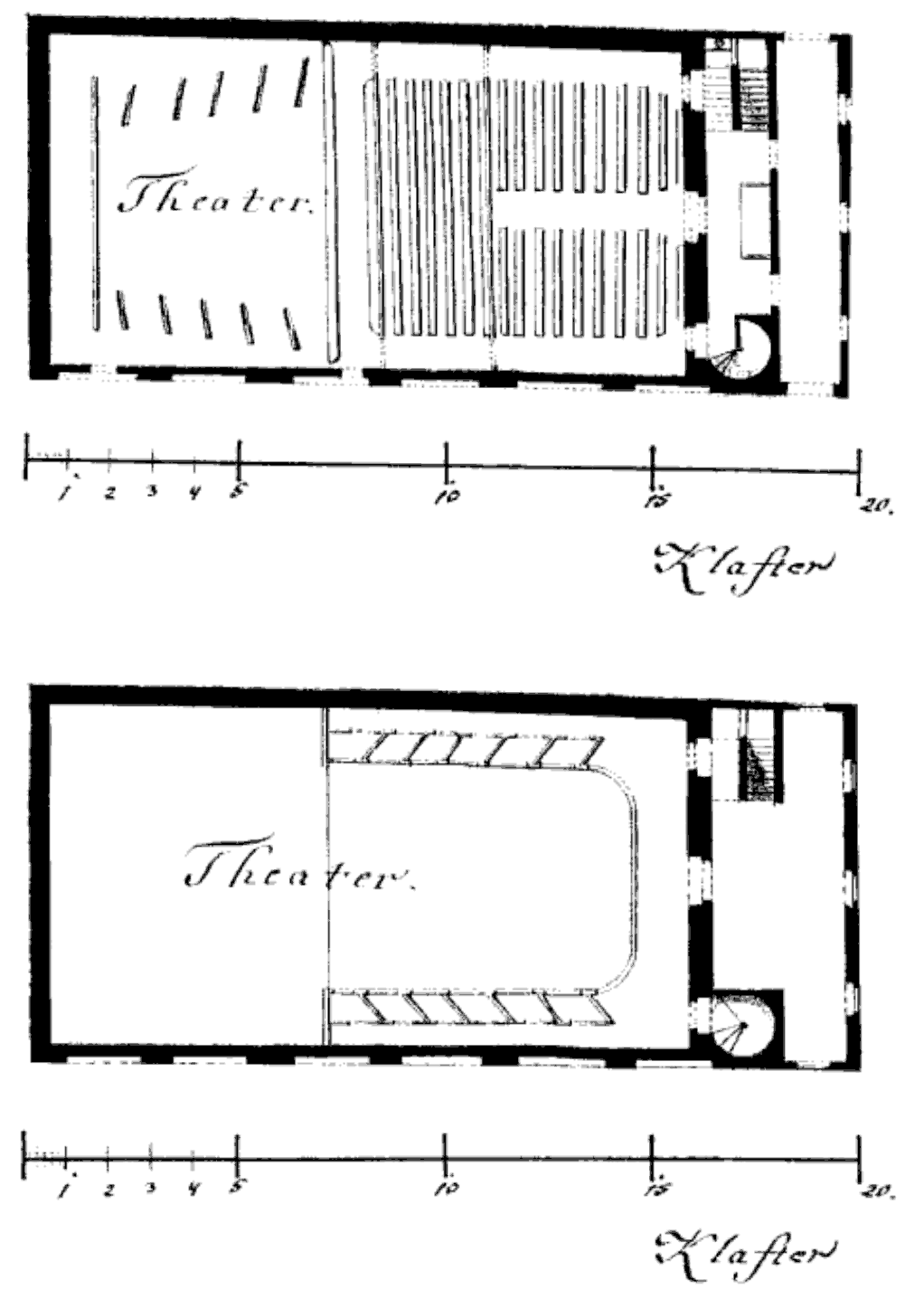
Floorplan of the ground level and first balcony level, from 1789. "Klafter" denotes a unit of measure, about 1.9 metres (6 ft 3 in). From the State Archives of Upper Austria in Linz

The Theater auf der Wieden, also called the Freihaus-Theater auf der Wieden or the Wiednertheater, was a theater located in the then-suburban Wieden district of Vienna in the late 18th century. It existed for only 14 years (1787–1801), but during this time it was the venue for the premiere of no fewer than 350 theatrical works, of which the most celebrated was Mozart's opera The Magic Flute. During most of this period the director of the theater was Emanuel Schikaneder, remembered today as librettist and impresario of The Magic Flute.

== Origin ==
The "Freihaus" was a large complex of businesses and residences belonging to the Starhemberg family. It was located at the northern edge of the Wiedner suburb, separated from the inner city by the "Glacis", the ring of open land that surrounded inner Vienna for purposes of military defense.

The Freihaus attracted intensive development because by an earlier Imperial decree (1647) it was free from taxation. The complex was called "das Starhembergische Freihaus" ("free-house of the Starhembergs"), from which was derived the name "Freihaus-Theater".

Christian Rossbach, a theater director who had already been successfully mounting productions in Vienna for several years, made an application to build a new theater in the Freihaus. This was approved 16 March 1787, and construction began, following a design by the architect Andreas Zach. The building was completed within six months and was opened for its first performance on 14 October.

== Structure ==
The theater was a three-story structure having a divided parterre (ground level) and two galleries (balconies). The external walls and roof were of brick and the interior was of wood. According to Krzeszowiak the theater had "very good acoustics". No description of the theater's capacity survives. The dimensions of the theater were 30 by 15 meters; Buch judges that the theater must have held over 500 spectators; Kurt Honolka estimates 800, then 1000 following an expansion carried out by Emanuel Schikaneder.

The stage area was substantial, forming 12 meters of the 30 meter length of the building. Honolka judges that it was "planned from the beginning for opulent scenic design." Examining the plays and librettos of Emanuel Schikaneder, Buch infers "a mechanical stage with three trap doors, movable flats and backdrops, and devices to accommodate flying machines, storms, sea battles, and similar effects."

== Performance history ==
The founding director was Christian Rossbach, who served from October 1787 to March 1788. Rossbach's venture lasted only a few months and ended in financial failure, despite a dispensation from the Emperor to perform during Lent. He first tried playing in cheaper venues in Vienna, then left Vienna with half of his troupe to play the provinces in Moravia.

Rossbach was succeeded by Johann Friedel, who ran the productions from March 1788 to his death in March 1789. Friedel worked in collaboration with his lover Eleonore Schikaneder, the estranged wife of Friedel's former theatrical colleague Emanuel Schikaneder. Like Rossbach Friedel was unable to make the theater a success, despite making improvements to the property and mounting as many as nine productions within a period of two weeks; Honolka comments that "they can scarcely have been properly rehearsed."

Following Friedel's death, Eleonore reconciled with her husband and invited him to take on the directorship, which he held from July 1789 until the theater's closure in June 1801. Schikaneder created a new troupe partly from the participants in Friedel's ensemble, and partly from personnel he brought with him from his former troupe, playing in Regensburg. The company offered "mostly German operas and plays with songs and incidental music (tragedies, comedies, and spectacles with elaborate stage machinery)". The company staged Mozart's Die Entführung aus dem Serail in April and May 1789.

Starting in 1789, Schikaneder's company staged a series of fairy tale operas. These included Der Stein der Weisen (The Philosopher's Stone), a collaboratively written work to which Mozart contributed a small portion of the music (see Benedikt Schack). The fairy tale series culminated with the premiere in September 1791 of Mozart's The Magic Flute. The latter was a success, and played for over 100 performances in its first year alone, 223 over the life of the theater. It gave rise to a sequel by Schikaneder and Peter von Winter (1798) entitled The Magic Flute Second Part.

The theater continued to be used for opera until 1801, when Schikaneder moved the troupe to his newly built Theater an der Wien. Prince Starhemberg, an efficient businessman, promptly tore down the old theater and replaced it with apartment housing. The roof tiles were reinstalled on the parish church of Perchtoldsdorf, where they can be seen to this day ().

== Scholarly opinion ==
Published opinion concerning the theater has evolved, raising the estimation of the quality of the building and the performances therein. This rise in its estimate has paralleled shifts in Mozart biography, as the field shifts away from the traditional assessment of Mozart's later life as wretched and despairing. (Specifically, it was presented as part of Mozart's decline that he was reduced to writing for a grossly inferior theater not affiliated with the court.)

Concerning the building, testimony from the early Romantic era is preserved in the writings of Ignaz von Seyfried (1776–1841), who was the musical director of the theater from 1798 to 1801; he continued in this role at the Theater an der Wien until 1826. In 1840, he wrote a contribution to the Neue Zeitschrift für Musik (12/46, 5 June 1840) in which he described the Theater an der Wieden in rather derogatory terms: "... for that limited venue, not much better than a wooden shack [German Holzbude], Mozart composed his immortal Magic Flute". As modern research has shown, this description is entirely false; see in particular Lorenz (2008). Of the legend, Kurt Honolka writes:

The loss of prestige which Schikaneder suffered at the end of the 19th century also extended to "his" theater. Of course, its simple structure could not measure up to the palatial court or civic "New Renaissance" buildings then being built. But it was of solid stone, with a tiled roof. The interior was made of wood, as was usual at the time.

Modern notes written for concert programs and recordings often still perpetuate the "shack" legend.

Traditional views also asserted that the standard of musical execution in the theater was poor; this for instance is the view taken in Hermann Abert's influential Mozart biography in 1920). The modern scholar David Buch, who had access to more historical materials than Abert, offers a different assessment:

Another myth about this theater has also persisted in modern literature, namely, that the music was of an inferior quality and that the performances were rather crude. While there is one derisive review of a performance at the Theater auf der Wieden by a north German commentator in 1793, most contemporary reviews were positive, noting a high standard of musical performance.

== See also ==
- Joseph Caché
