= Der Stein der Weisen =

Opera composed in 1790

Der Stein der Weisen, oder die Zauberinsel (German for The Philosopher's Stone, or the Enchanted Isle) is a singspiel in two acts, jointly composed by Johann Baptist Henneberg, Benedikt Schack, Franz Xaver Gerl, Emanuel Schikaneder, and Wolfgang Amadeus Mozart in 1790. The libretto was written by Schikaneder.

== Composition ==
Der Stein der Weisen was composed using a "team approach" in which each composer contributed individual sections of the piece. All five wrote parts of act 2, and all except Mozart wrote parts of act 1. Henneberg composed the work's overture. Schikaneder wrote the libretto for the entire piece. The text is based on a fairy tale from Christoph Martin Wieland's Dschinnistan, published in the late 1780s.

All five were later involved in The Magic Flute: Mozart as composer, Schikaneder as librettist, impresario and performer (Papageno), Henneberg as conductor, and Schack and Gerl as performers (respectively Tamino and Sarastro). Der Stein der Weisen may have provided a model for that work, as the two have a similar structure and source.

== Reception and study ==
The work was initially popular, but was largely absent from the standard repertoire for the two centuries after 1814. American musicologist David Buch announced the discovery of a Viennese score with attributions to all five composers. This was taken by some to indicate that Der Stein der Weisen was a previously unknown Mozart work, although in fact only a duet ("Nun, liebes Weibchen", known as the "cat duet") and two sections of the act 2 finale were attributed to him. Mozart's contributions are catalogued as K. 714.

The autograph of "Nun, liebes Weibchen" (K. 625/592a/Anh.A 64) is held by the Bibliothèque Nationale in Paris; the rest of the original score is lost. The work is known from a ca. 1795 copy.

The manuscript of nearly the entire opera has been found at Hamburg State Library by David J. Buch in 1996 and he made the first edition in 1998.

Another manuscript is available at the Frankfurt University Library or Universitätsbibliothek Johann Christian Senckenberg Frankfurt am Main under Signature "Mus Hs Opern 508 (1) containing the aria of Forte "Die Lieb ist wohl ein närrisch Ding" which is lacking in the Hamburg source.

== Performances ==
The singspiel was premiered on 11 September 1790 in the Theater auf der Wieden, conducted by Henneberg. It was first recorded by the Boston Baroque in 1999.

After the successful world premiere, the opera was performed over 24 years without interruption, the last performance was on 28 February 1814 in Linz, Austria.

Performances after discovery of the manuscript and re-publication by Buch in 1998 include:

- 2000: Hampstead and Highgate Festival
- 2001: Augsburg
- July 2001: Bampton Classical Opera in an English translation by Barry Millington
- 2001: Pepperdine University
- 2003: Combattimento Consort Amsterdam
- 2006: Astoria Music Festival
- 2006: Haus für Mozart, Salzburg
- 2006: Garsington Opera Festival 2006
- September 2010: Orchester Musikkollegium Winterthur / Zurich Opera House
- June 2018: Tyrolean State Theatre, Innsbruck
- December 2022: Augsburg, in concert

== Editions ==
- First Edition by David J. Buch with A-R-Editions
- New edition by publisher ClassiCulturCentrum / Ellenberger.institute with own website presenting all about the opera
- Sounding partitions as films on YouTube
- Full audio recording of 1999 label Telarc
- Audio Recording of Münchner Hofkapelle 2024
