= Benedikt Schack =

Austrian opera singer (1758–1826)

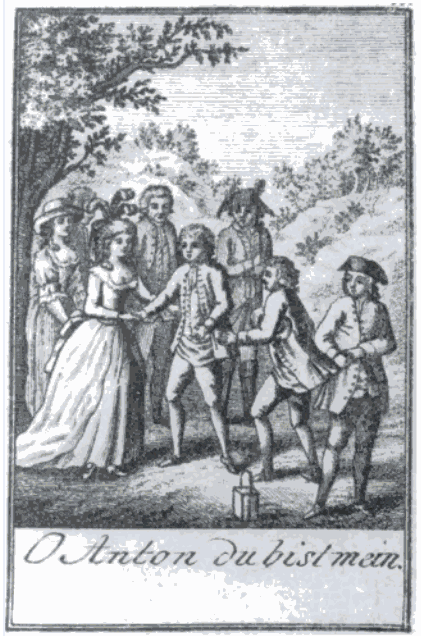
Benedikt Schack in performance with the Schikaneder troupe: the number "O Anton du bist mein" from the Singspiel Die Zween Anton. Schack is at center, his hands held by soprano Josepha Hofer and baritone/impresario Emanuel Schikaneder. Click on image for the identities of the other players and the original source.

Benedikt Emanuel Schack (Czech: Benedikt Žák; 7 February 1758 – 10 December 1826) was a composer and tenor of the Classical era, a close friend of Mozart and the first performer of the role of Tamino in Mozart's opera The Magic Flute.

== Early life ==
Benedikt Schack (also spelled as Žák, Ziak, Cziak or Schak) was born on 7 February 1758 in Mirotice, Bohemia (now the Czech Republic, then part of the Habsburg monarchy). Like Joseph and Michael Haydn, he worked as a chorister as a child, singing from 1773 in the cathedral in Prague, then moved to Vienna (1775) to study medicine, philosophy and singing. His voice teacher in Vienna was Karl Frieberth, a tenor who performed under Joseph Haydn. From 1780, Schack worked for several years as Kapellmeister to Prince Heinrich von Schönaich-Carolath in Silesia.

In 1786, Schack joined the traveling theatrical troupe of Emanuel Schikaneder, working both as a tenor and as a composer of Singspiele. The troupe settled in Vienna in 1789, performing in the suburban Theater auf der Wieden.

== Friendship and collaborations with Mozart ==
It was around this time that Schack became a friend and professional colleague of Mozart, who was gradually increasing his involvement with Schikaneder's troupe. Schack apparently asked his friend for advice and help in composing, and the level of assistance evidently increased. The following anecdote was published in the Baierisches Musik-Lexikon by Felix Joseph von Lipowsky (Munich, 1811):

Mozart often came to Schack to fetch him for a stroll; while Schack dressed he would sit at the writing desk and compose here and there a piece in Schack's operas. Thus several passages in Schack's operas derive from Mozart's own hand and genius.

In 1790, Schack and his fellow singer-composers of the Schikaneder troupe collaborated to write an opera Der Stein der Weisen ("The Philosopher's Stone"). Mozart also played a part in its composition, contributing a duet ("Nun liebes Weibchen," K. 625/592a) and perhaps other passages. This fairy-tale opera can be considered a kind of precursor to The Magic Flute; it employed much the same cast in similar roles.

When The Magic Flute (music by Mozart, libretto by Schikaneder) premiered in 1791, Schack took the role of Tamino. According to the New Grove, "it is to be presumed that he also played Tamino's flute solos", though other scholars disagree. An 1815 source indicates that Schack sang the role a total of 116 times.

Only two months after the Magic Flute premiere, Mozart died. According to a story that first appeared in an anonymous obituary of Schack in 1827, 36 years after Mozart's death, the two men participated in a rehearsal of Mozart's Requiem on the last day of Mozart's life.

On the very eve of his death, Mozart had the score of the Requiem brought to his bed, and himself (it was two o'clock in the afternoon) sang the alto part; Schack, the family friend, sang the soprano line, as he had always previously done, Hofer, Mozart's brother-in-law, took the tenor, Gerl, later a bass singer at the Mannheim Theater, the bass. They were at the first bars of the Lacrimosa when Mozart began to weep bitterly, laid the score on one side, and eleven hours later, at one o'clock in the morning (of 5 December 1791, as is well known), departed this life.

Mozart wrote a set of eight variations (K. 613) on Schack's aria "Ein Weib ist das herrlichste Ding" from the Singspiel Der dumme Gärtner.

== Later life ==
Later, Schack moved on to posts in Graz (1793) and Munich (1796). With the decline of his singing voice, he retired in 1813 and lived on a pension. He died in Munich on 10 December 1826.

Toward the end of his life, Schack was sent a letter by the former Constanze Mozart, which attests to his friendship with Wolfgang. Constanze, who had remarried (1809) to Georg Nikolaus Nissen, was seeking information to include in her second husband's biography-in-progress of her first. She wrote, "I could think of absolutely no one who knew him better or to whom he was more devoted than you ... Of great and general interest will be what you can instance of Mozart's few compositions in your operas." However, Schack died before he was able to reply to Constanze's letter.

Schack was married to the former Elisabeth Weinhold, who was also a singer; she took the role of the Third Lady in the Magic Flute premiere.

== Assessment ==
Testimony for Schack's abilities as a singer comes from Leopold Mozart, who heard his debut performance with the Schikaneder troupe while it was visiting Salzburg in 1786. Leopold described Schack in a letter Leopold wrote to his daughter Maria Anna (Nannerl), who was living in nearby St. Gilgen:

The new tenor hired by Schikaneder arrived yesterday. He sings excellently well and has a beautiful voice, with an easy and flexible throat and a beautiful method. For this reason another opera, La Frascatana, will be given so that the public can hear him on next Wednesday ... This man truly sings very beautifully."

Schack's collaborative opera Der Stein der Weisen has recently been revived, prompted by the discovery of an early manuscript copy, by Boston Baroque under Martin Pearlman; the work has received favorable reviews. Bampton Classical Opera performed it in 2002.
