= Hermann Abert =

German historian of music (1871–1927)

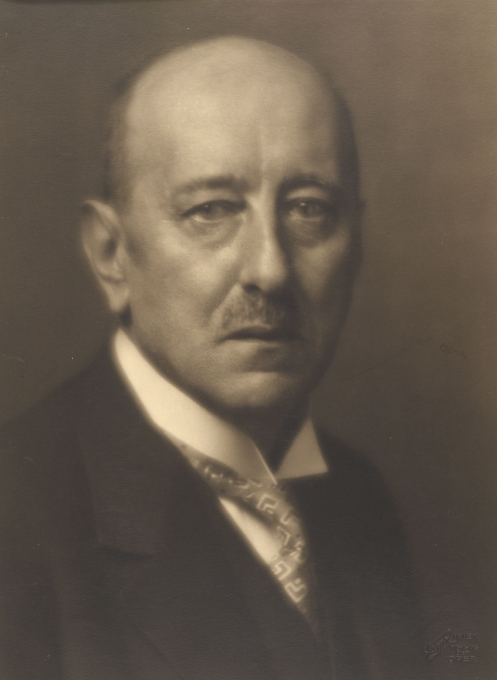
Hermann Abert

Hermann Abert (German: [ˈʔaːbɐt]; 25 March 1871 – 13 August 1927) was a German historian of music.

== Life ==
Abert was born in Stuttgart, the son of Johann Josef Abert (1832–1915), the Hofkapellmeister of that city.

From 1890 to 1896 he studied classical philology at the Universities of Tübingen, Berlin and Leipzig. While at Tübingen he joined the Akademische Gesellschaft Stuttgardia, a student fraternity which shaped the political views of the liberalism in southern Germany. His philological studies ended in 1896 at Halle, where he had done work on Ancient Greek music. For the next three years he studied music theory at Berlin. In 1902 he qualified as lecturer by presenting his thesis on music of the Middle Ages at the University of Halle.

Abert stayed on at Halle as a lecturer, becoming a senior lecturer (or associate professor) in 1910 and a full professor in 1918. In this capacity he moved the next year to the University of Heidelberg. But after just one year, Abert took up a post at Leipzig and in 1920 he became the successor of the music theorist Hugo Riemann. In 1923 he was called to the University of Berlin, where he was seen as the most suitable successor to Hermann Kretzschmar, also a music theorist. It was there that he worked with Friedrich Blume, Rudolf Gerber, Hans Hoffmann and Theodor Schwartzkopff, on the illustrated Dictionary of Music which was discovered to contain plagiarisms of Alfred Einstein's Neues Musiklexikon und Hugo Riemann Musiklexikon.

In 1925 he was admitted to the Prussian Academy of Sciences, the first music theorist to be granted this honour.

On 13 August 1927, Prof. Dr. Hermann Abert died at Stuttgart, aged 56.

Abert's daughter, Anna Amalie, became Professor of Musicology at the University of Kiel.

== Works ==
- Die Lehre vom Ethos in der griechischen Musik. (Dissertation, "The Teaching of Ethics in Greek music") (Breitkopf & Härtel, Leipzig, 1899).
- Die ästhetischen Grundsätze der mittelalterlichen Melodienbildung. ("The aesthetic foundations of medieval melody") (Univ. Habil., Halle/Saale, 1902).
- Robert Schumann (Schlesische Verlags-Anstalt, Berlin 1903, 3rd end. 1917).
- The Concept of Music in Mediaeval Times and its Principles (Niemeyer, Halle 1905).
- Dramatic Music at the Court of Duke Karl Eugen of Württemberg (1905).
- Niccolò Jomelli as a Composer of Operas (Niemeyer, Halle 1908).
- History of the Robert Franz Academy of Music in Halle (1908).
- a Gluck Annual, (4 issues from 1914), and a Mozart Annual (Drei Masken Verlag, Munich 1923).
- Johann Josef Abert: sein Leben und seine Werke. ("J. J. Abert: his Life and Work") (Pfaehler, Bad Neustadt 1983). (Reprint of Leipzig (Breitkopf) ed., 1916.) ISBN 3-922923-26-7
- Wolfgang Amadeus Mozart: eine Biographie (largely re-written from the original work of Otto Jahn) (Breitkopf & Härtel, Leipzig 1920). (Vol. 1, 1756–1782; Vol. 2, 1783–1791).
- Goethe and Music (J. Engelhorn, Stuttgart 1922).
- Illustriertes Musik-Lexikon. (J. Engelhorns Nachfahren, Stuttgart 1927).
- Gesammelte Schriften und Vorträge. ("Collected writings and lectures") Schneider, Tutzing 1968. (Reprint of Halle ed., 1929.)

=== English translations ===
- Abert, Hermann (2007). Eisen, Cliff (ed.). W. A. Mozart. Translated by Spencer, Stewart. New Haven: Yale University Press. ISBN 9780300072235. OCLC 70401564.
- Abert, Hermann (1976). Mozart's Don Giovanni. Translated by Gellorn, Peter. London: Eulenburg Books. ISBN 9780903873116. OCLC 3475571.
