= Reich Court building =

- Reichsgerichtsgebäude (German)
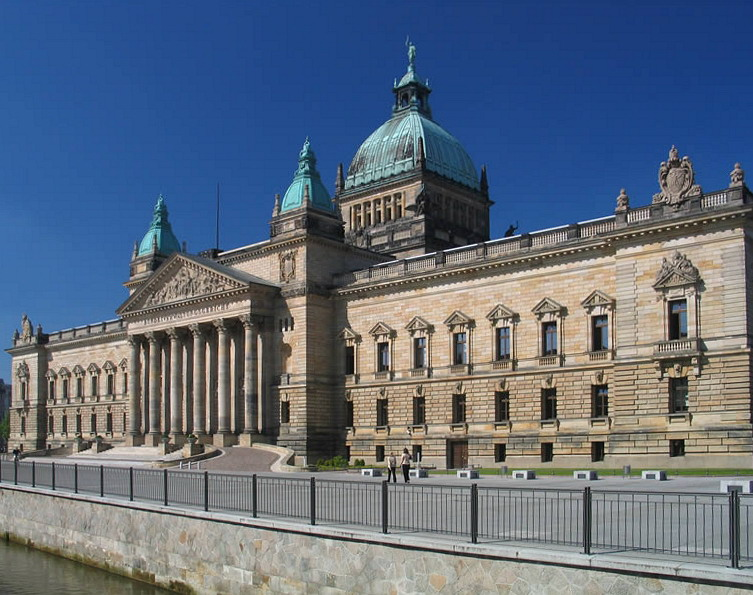
- View of the building in 2004
- Alternative names: Imperial Court of Justice Building

General information
- Type: Courthouse
- Architectural style: Eclectic; Renaissance Revival architecture
- Location: Simsonplatz 1, 04107 Leipzig, Germany
- Coordinates: 51°19′58.9″N 12°22′11.2″E
- Current tenants: Bundesverwaltungsgericht
- Inaugurated: 1895

Height
- Height: 64.5 m (212 ft)

Dimensions
- Diameter: 125 m × 76 m (410 ft × 249 ft)

Design and construction
- Architects: Ludwig Hoffmann, Peter Dybwad

Other information
- Public transit: Leipzig Wilhelm-Leuschner-Platz station by Mitteldeutschland S-Bahn, Tram und bus stops Neues Rathaus and Wilhelm-Leuschner-Platz by Trams in Leipzig

The Reich Court building (German: Reichsgerichtsgebäude) was designed and built as the seat of the Reich Court, and since 2002 it is the seat of the Federal Administrative Court of Germany (German: Bundesverwaltungsgericht). It is located in the immediate vicinity of the New Town Hall in Leipzig, in the Musikviertel neighbourhood of the borough of Leipzig-Mitte.

== Architecture ==
The construction of the building was preceded by a public architectural competition, the requirements of which were published in the Centralblatt der Bauverwaltung in March 1885. The building was built in seven years, between 1888 and 1895, by the architects Ludwig Hoffmann (1852–1932) and Peter Dybwad (1859–1921). They had won the contract, but then they had built it in a slightly modified form. The style of the building is linked to the late Italian Renaissance architecture (and therefore to Roman antiquity) and to the buildings of the French Baroque architecture. The traditional classification of the building in late historicism has proved problematic in the context of a historical analysis of the art of the building. The architecture style is similar to that of the Reichstag building in Berlin. The buildings were erected at the same time and are dedicated to the historic architecture of castles and museums.

A high dome sits above the imposing building and is decorated with the sculpture The Truth. The main portal faces east, towards the square named after the first president of the Reich Court, Eduard von Simson (1810–1899). The north side is decorated with sculptures of influential figures in German legal history: Eike of Repgow (Sachsenspiegel), Johann of Schwarzenberg (Constitutio Criminalis Bambergensis), Johann Jakob Moser, Carl Gottlieb Svarez (General State Laws for the Prussian States), Paul Johann Anselm Ritter von Feuerbach and Friedrich Carl von Savigny.

The interior of the building is designed both functionally and creatively to serve as a courtroom. The sculptures, elaborate frescoes and murals address the themes of investigation, judgment, execution and grace. The Großer Sitzungssaal (Great Meeting Hall) has a particularly attractive design, with symbols and coats of arms of all the former federated states in the German Empire on the walls. The stained glass windows display the coats of arms of all the towns that have been the seat of an Oberlandesgericht ("provincial court of appeal"). Alexander Linnemann, a native of Frankfurt, created all the stained glass windows, both figurative and ornamental, in the building.

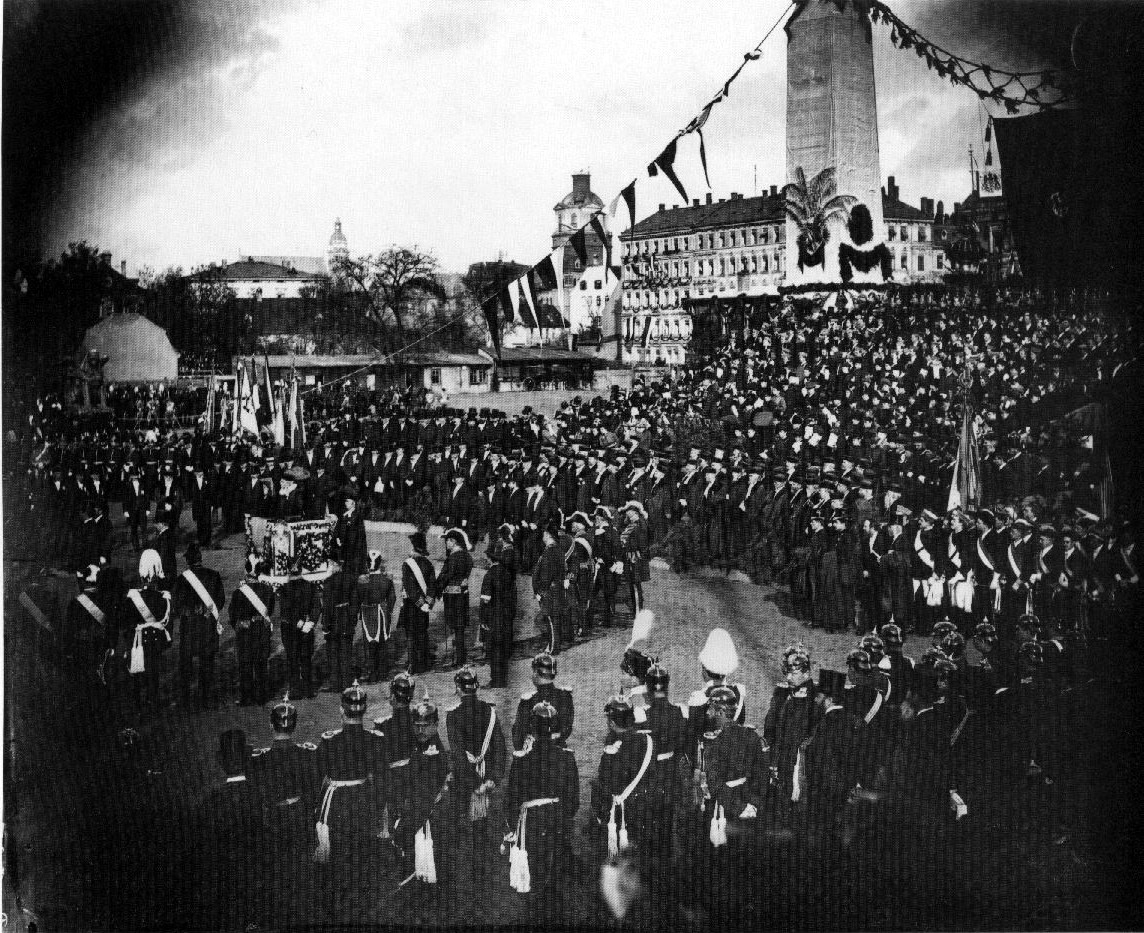
Laying of the foundation stone in 1888

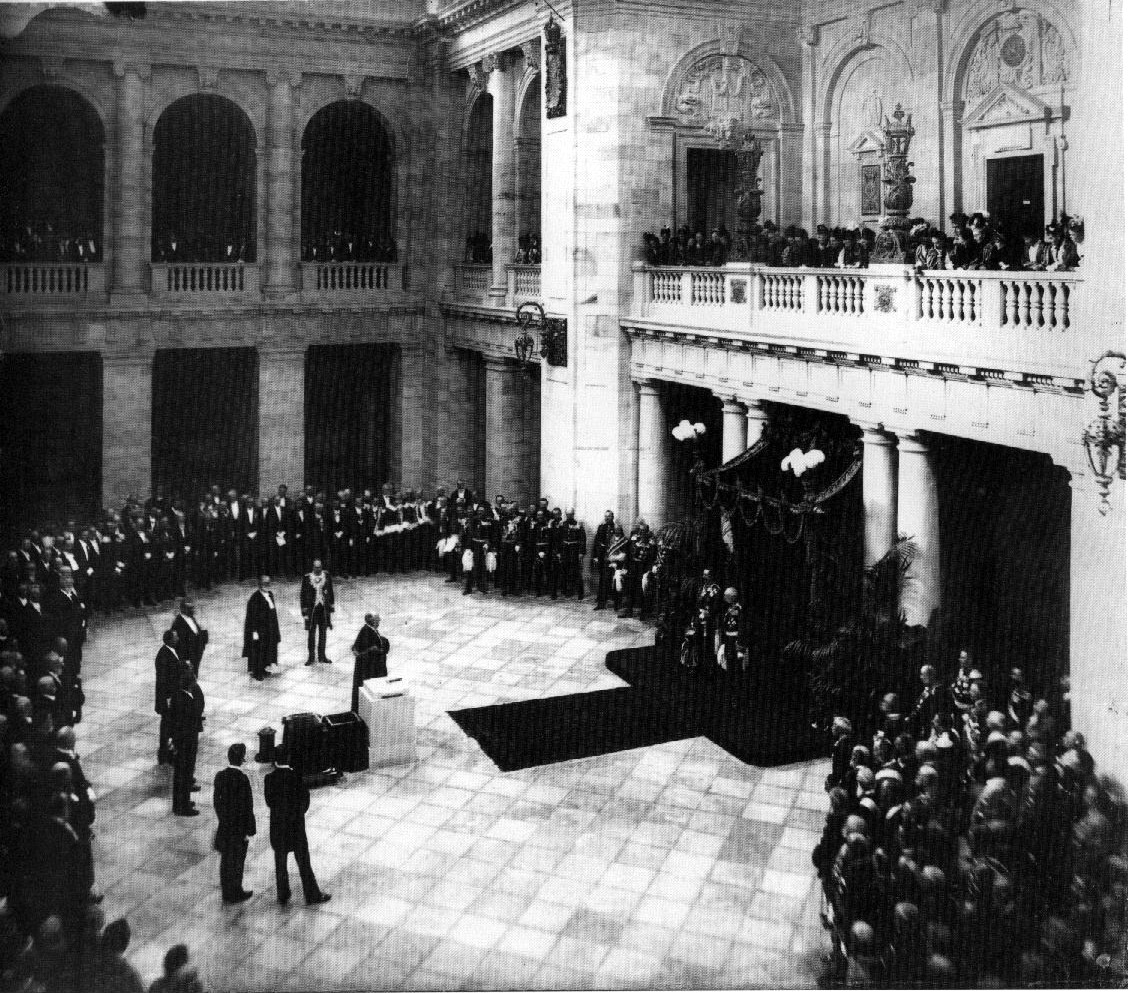
Inauguration of the Reich Court building in 1895

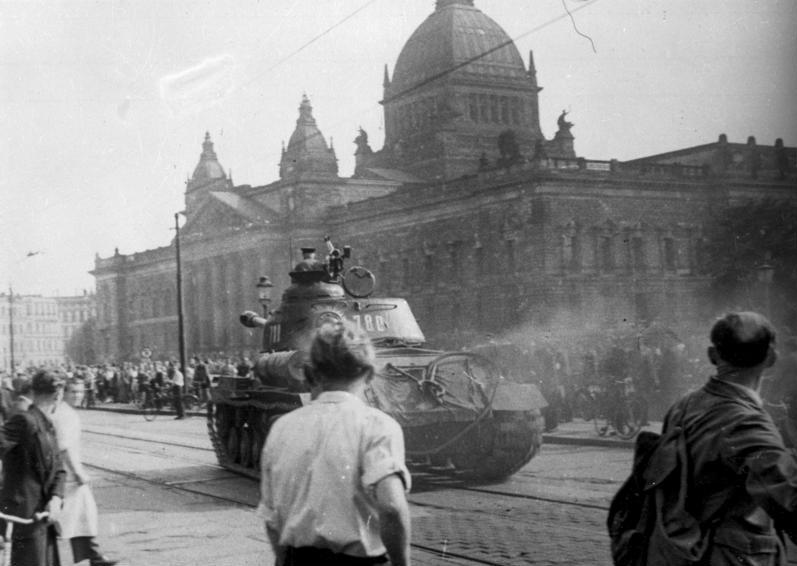
Soviet tank in front of the building, 17 June 1953

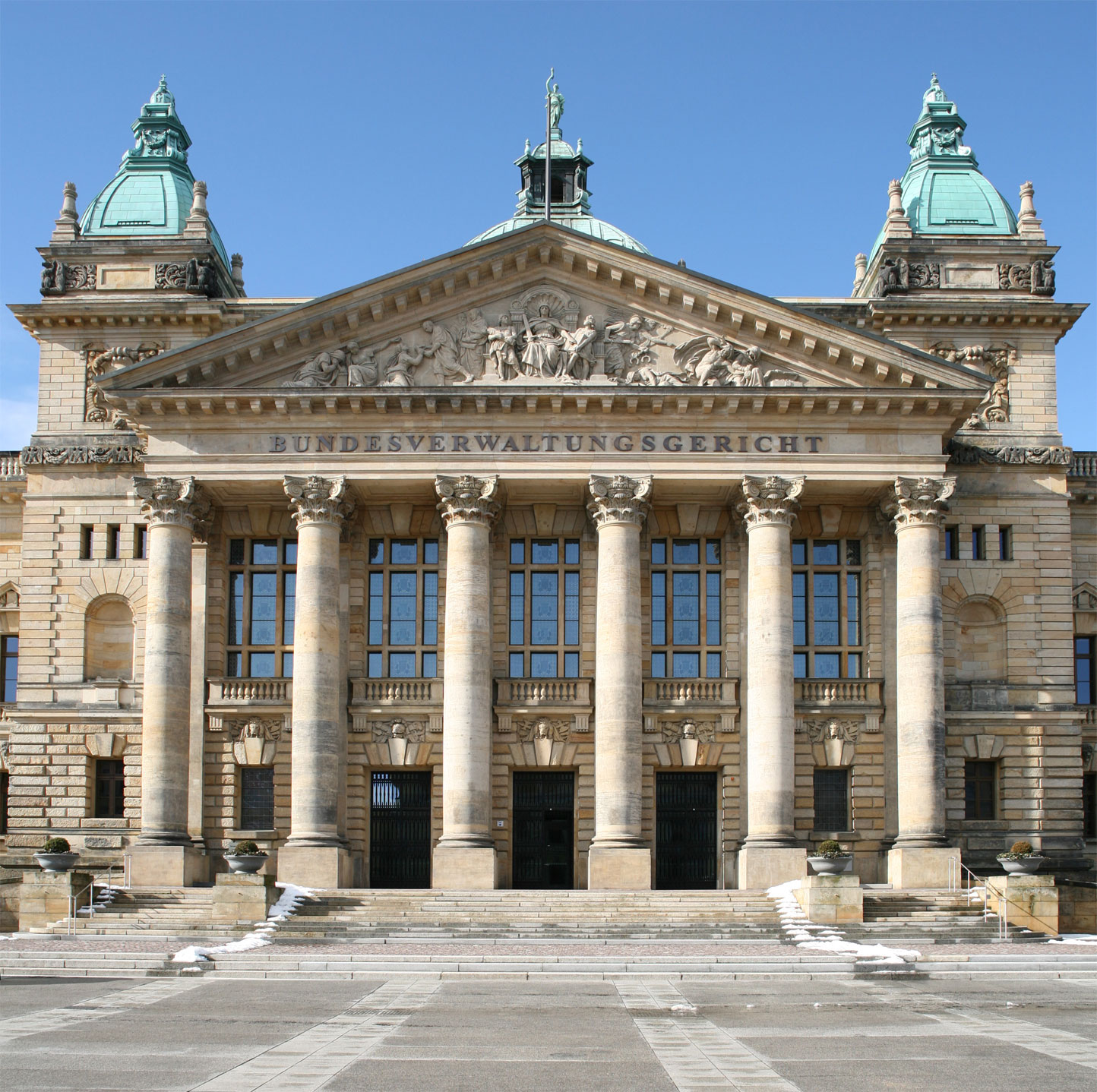
Gate with gable (2006)

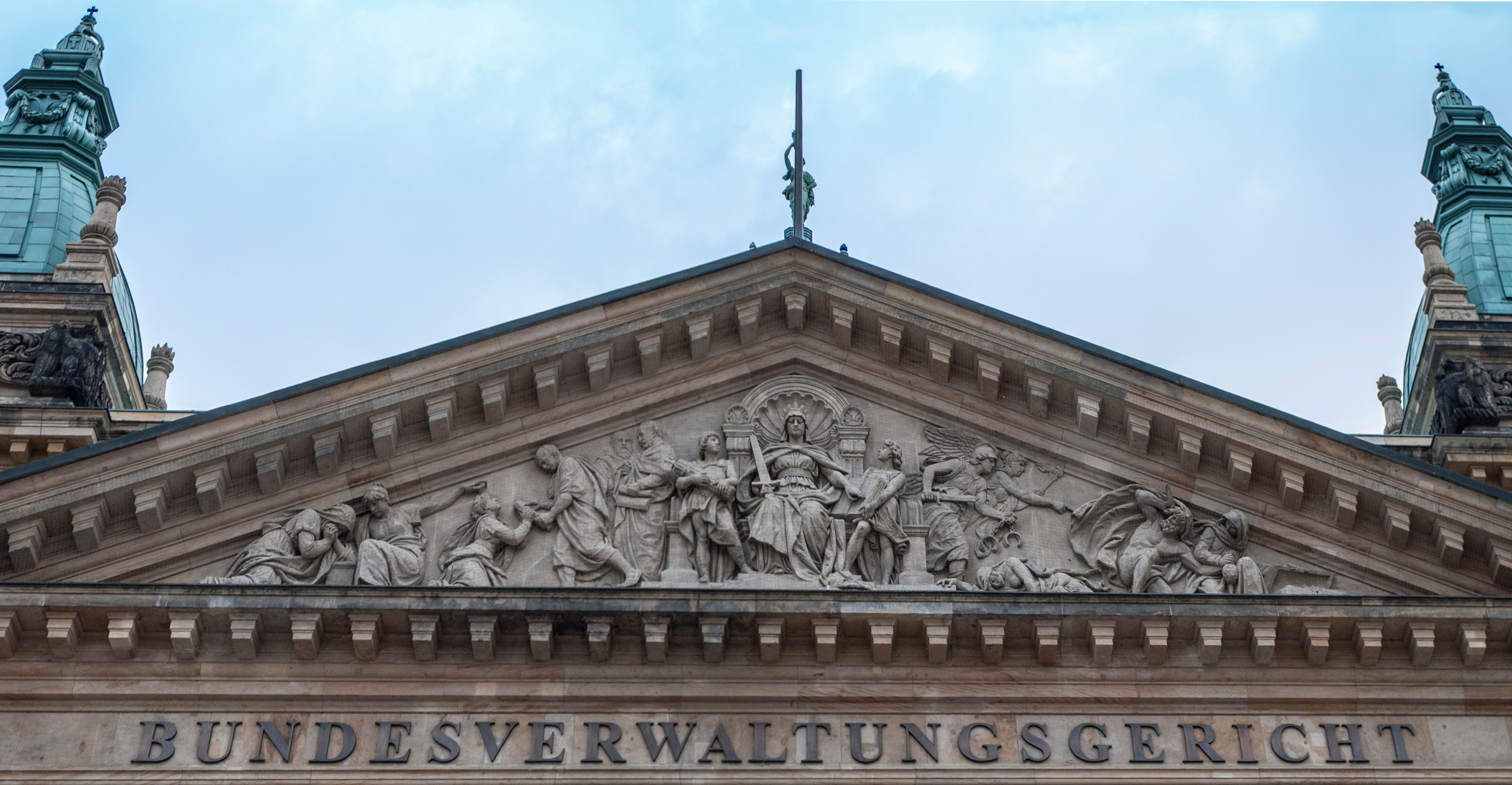
The gable of the current Federal Administrative Court

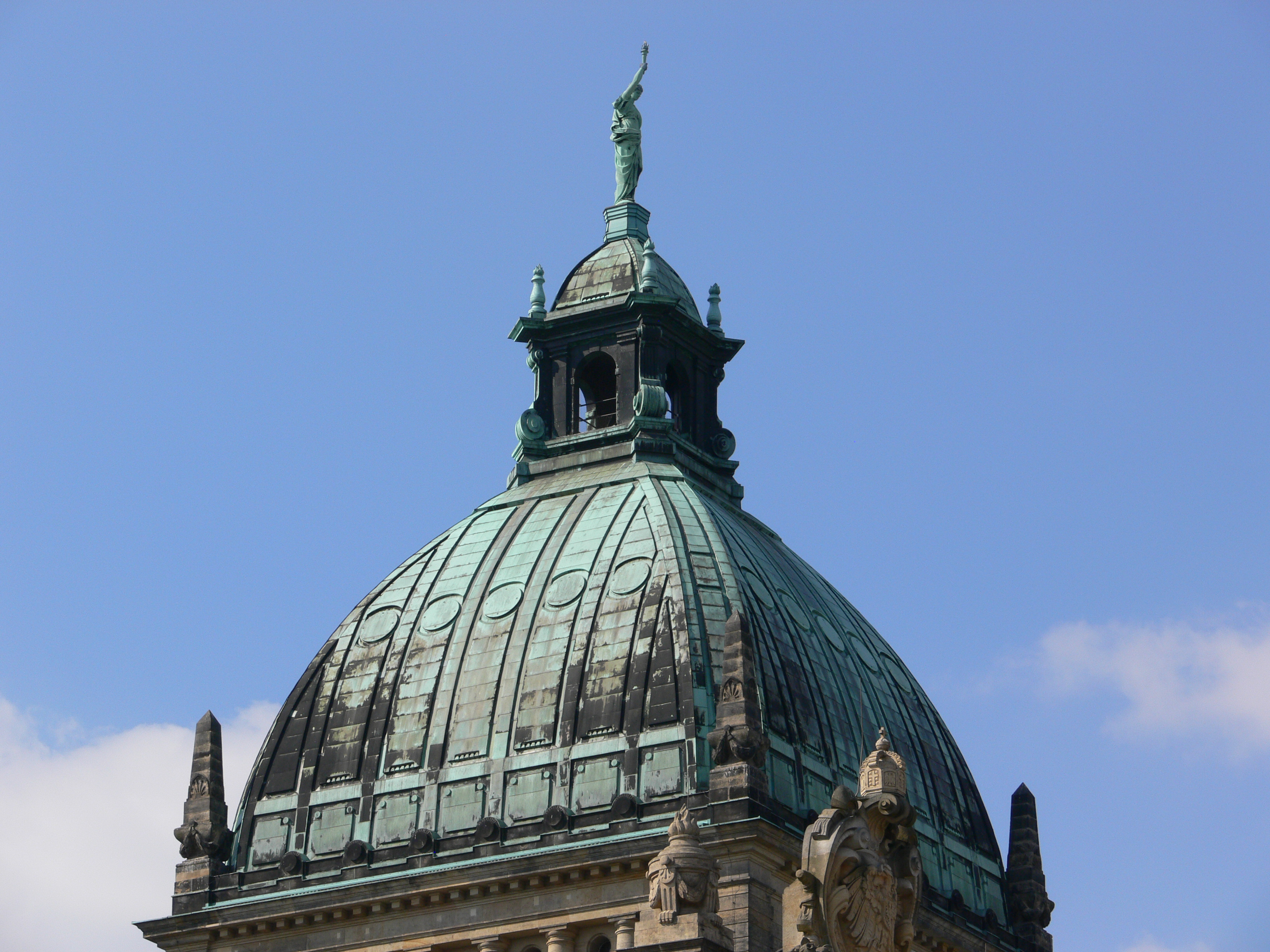
Dome with sculpture The Truth (by Otto Lessing)

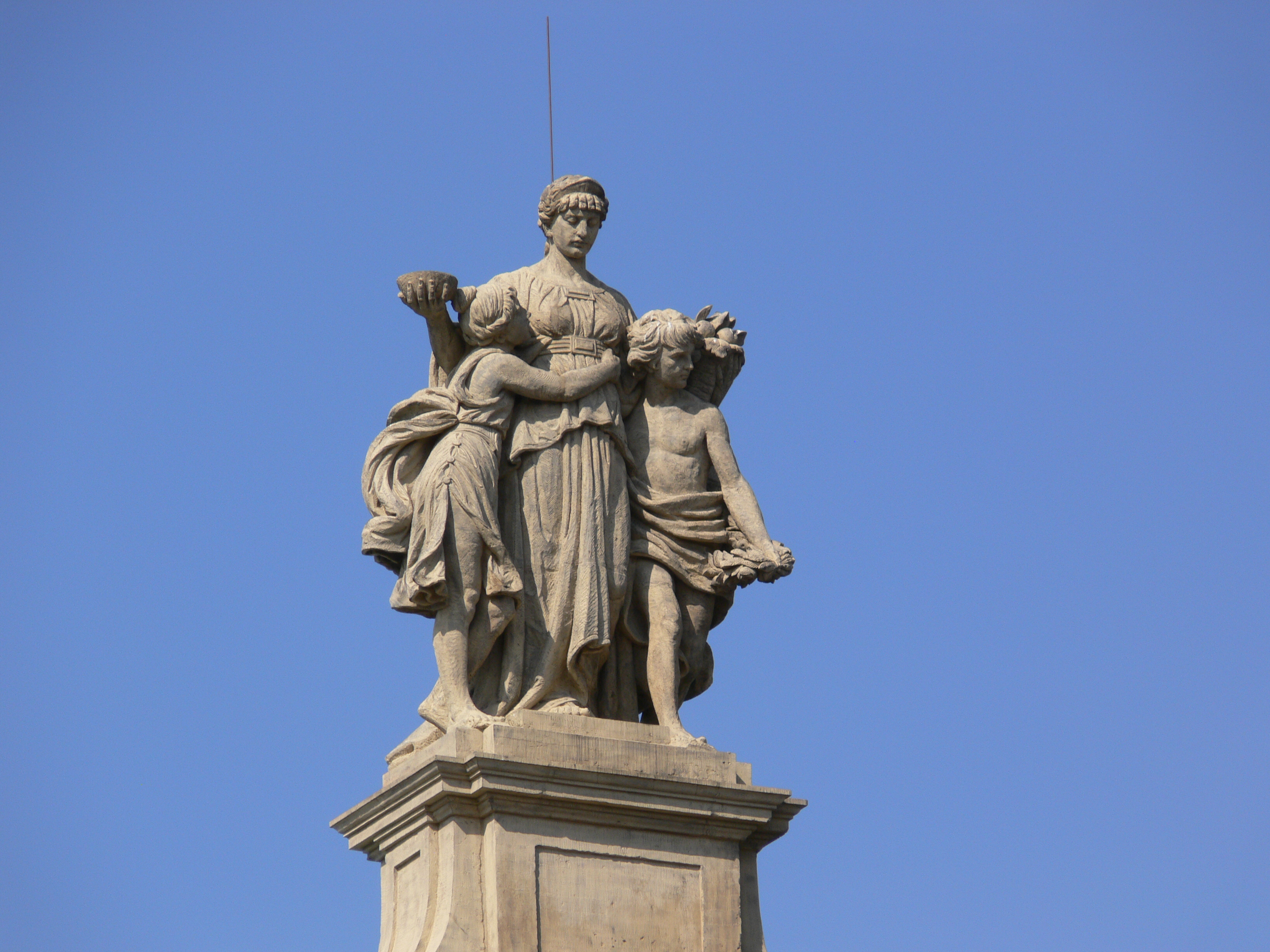
Sculpture on the South Wing: Allegory of Hospitality

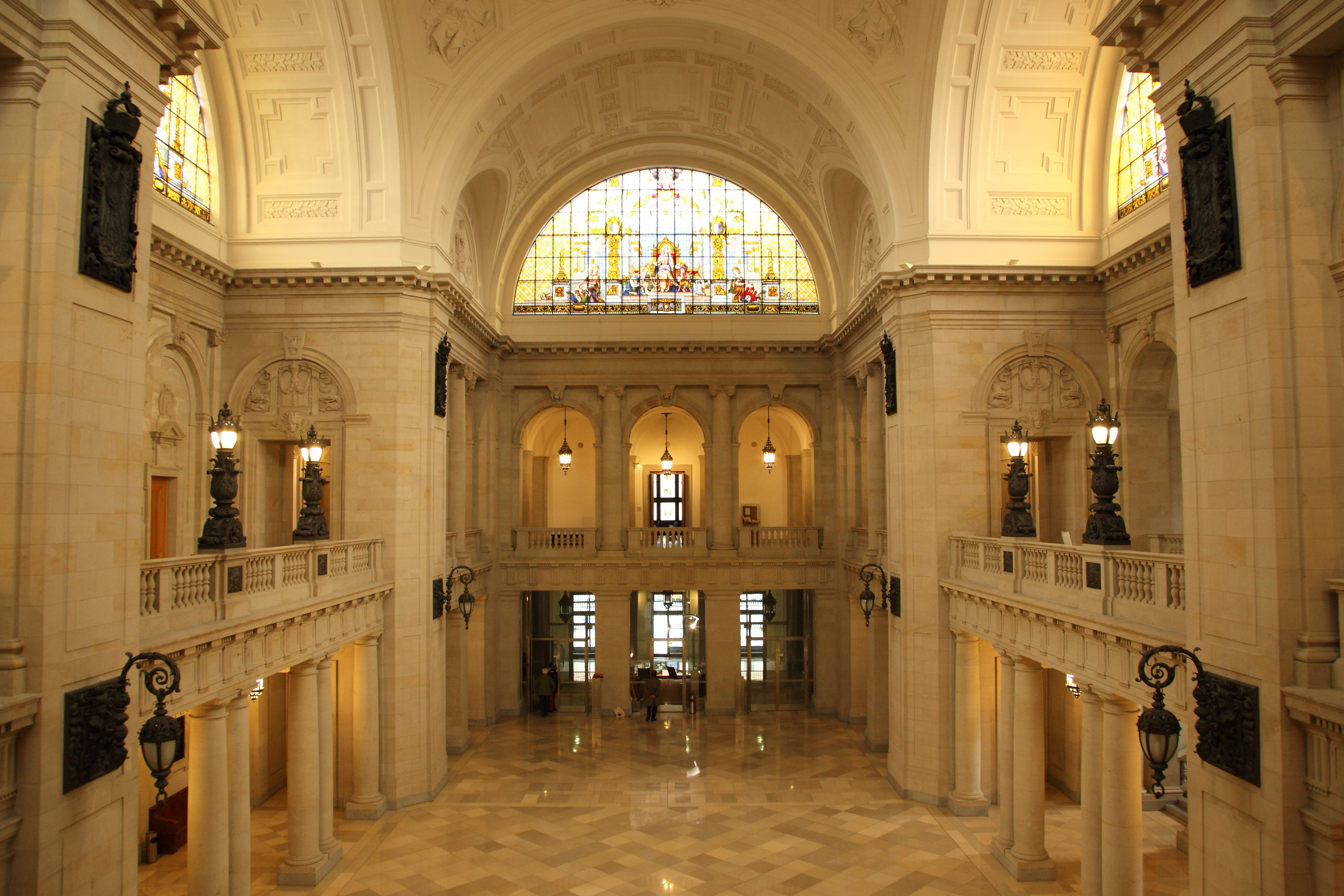
Lobby/waiting room

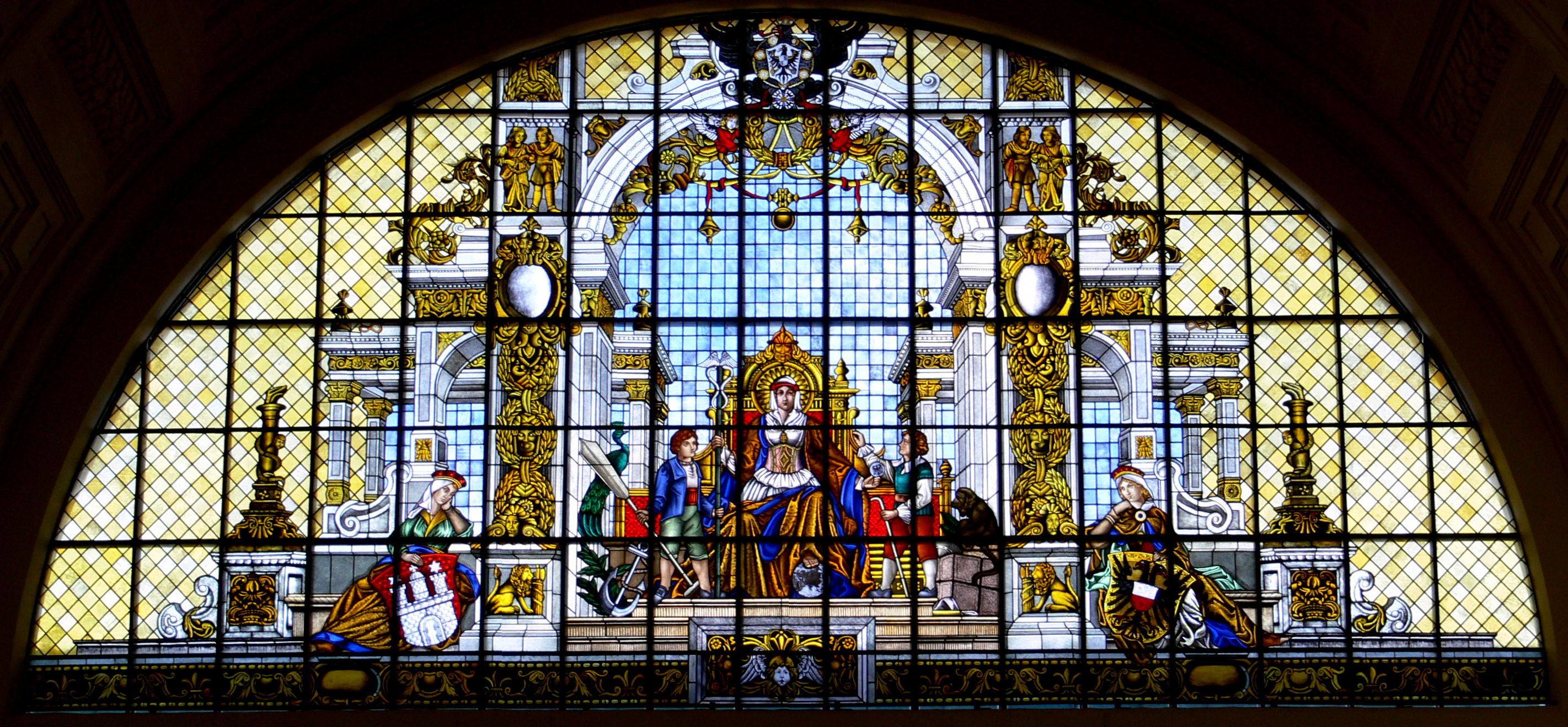
Stained glass window in the entrance hall (by Alexander Linnemann)

Als Vorbild galt der 1860-1883 von Joseph Poelart in Brüssel errichtete Justizpalast: das größte Gebäude des 19. Jahrhunderts in Europa. Dass so gewaltige Architektur einschüchternd wirkt, war durchaus beabsichtigt.

The Model was the Palace of Justice built by Joseph Poelaert in Brussels between 1860 and 1883: the largest building of the 19th century in Europe. The fact that such massive architecture is intimidating was quite intentional.

— Bettina Vaupel, Das ehemalige Leipziger Reichsgericht. Einschüchtern war Absicht, 2007

== Usage ==
Throughout its history, the building primarily served as offices of justice, but for short periods it housed museums like the Georgi-Dimitrov-Museum and the Museum der bildenden Künste, other state offices, and even a dubbing studio for DEFA.

== Public Accessibility ==
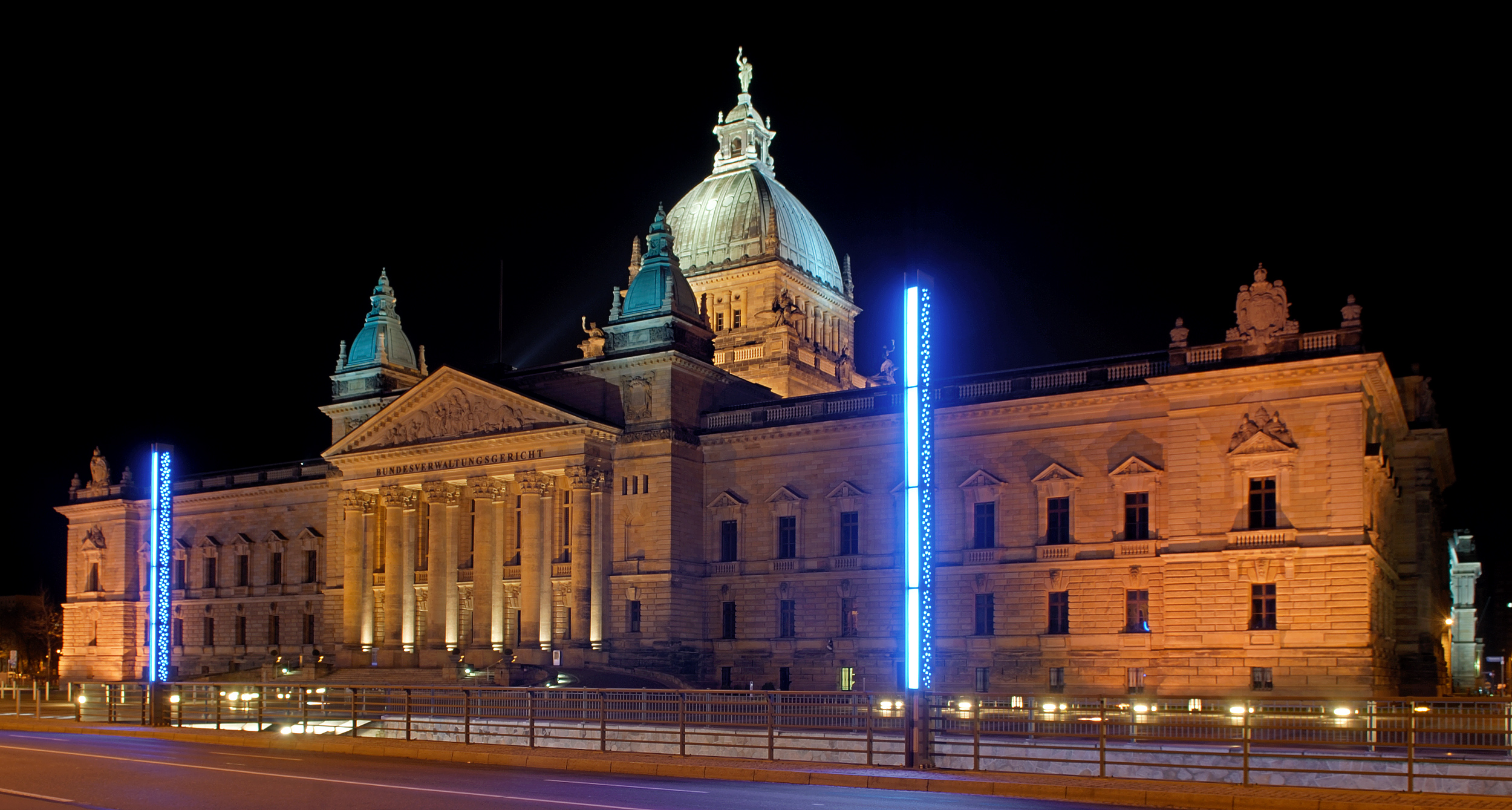
Night lighting

The atrium, including the corridors and the magnificent conference room, is open to all visitors. Those who are particularly interested can take guided tours of other parts of the court when they register. Since 31 May 2007, a museum room is home to the exhibition "Das Reichsgerichtsgebäude und seine Nutzer" (The Imperial Court of Justice building and its users).

== See also ==
- Architecture of Leipzig
- State Court for the German Reich
- Cotta Sandstone
