= Dschinnistan =

1786–1789 story collection edited by Christoph Martin Wieland

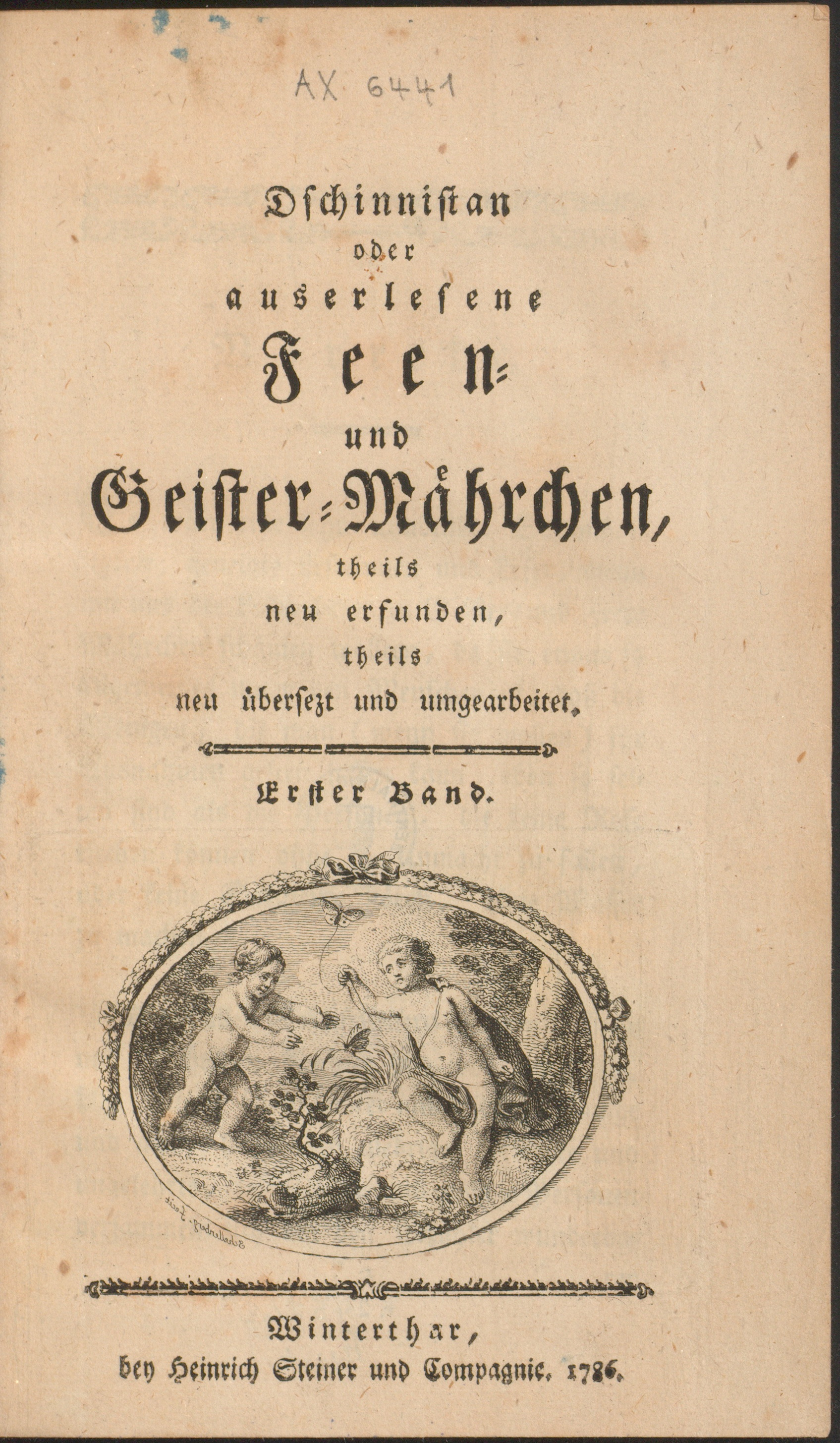
- Title page of the first volume
- Editor: Christoph Martin Wieland
- Illustrator: Johann Rudolph Schellenberg
- Language: German
- Genre: fairy tale
- Publisher: Heinrich Steiner und Compagnie
- Publication date: 1786–1789
- Publication place: Switzerland

Dschinnistan oder Auserlesene Feen- und Geistermärchen (lit. 'Djinnistan or Selected Fairy and Ghost Tales') is a collection of fairy tales, edited by the German writer Christoph Martin Wieland and published in three volumes in 1786, 1787 and 1789. It contains a mixture of retold traditional stories, translated French literary fairy tales and original works. Of the 19 stories, Wieland was responsible for 13 as either writer or translator. The collection was illustrated by Johann Rudolph Schellenberg.

== Stories ==
Written by Christoph Martin Wieland:

- "Nadir und Nadine"
- "Adis und Dahy"
- "Neangir und seine Brüder, Argentine und ihre Schwestern"
- "Der Stein der Weisen oder Sylvester und Rosine"
- "Timander und Melissa"
- "Himmelblau und Lupine"
- "Der goldene Zweig"
- "Der Druide oder die Salamandrin und die Bildsäule"
- "Alboflede"
- "Pertharit und Ferrandine"
- "Der eiserne Armleuchter"
- "Der Greif vom Gebirge Kaf"

Written by Friedrich Hildebrand von Einsiedel:

- "Der Zweikampf"
- "Das Labyrinth"
- "Die klugen Knaben"
- "Die Prinzessin mit der langen Nase"

Written by August Jacob Liebeskind:

- "Der Korb"
- "Lulu oder die Zauberflöte"

Co-written by Wieland and an anonymous author, possibly Caroline von Wolzogen:

- "Der Palast der Wahrheit"

== Legacy ==
"Der Stein der Weisen" was the basis for the opera Der Stein der Weisen (1790). "Lulu oder die Zauberflöte" influenced the operas The Magic Flute (1791), Der Fagottist (1791) and Lulu (1824).

The place name Dschinnistan appears in E. T. A. Hoffmann's Little Zaches called Cinnabar (1819) and Karl May's Ardistan und Dschinnistan (1907–1909).
