= Abderites =

Abderites or Abderite may refer to:

- People associated with the ancient city of Abdera, Thrace
- Adherents of the philosophical school of Abdera
- Abderite, a reference to Democritus, native of Abdera; later acquired the generic meaning of "scoffer"
- Abderites, archetypical fools in classical Greece, akin of the Wise Men of Gotham
- History of the Abderites, a novel by Christoph Martin Wieland
- Abderites (mammal), a genus of Paucituberculata from South America
