= Antoine Gilbert Griffet de Labaume =

- Born: 21 November 1756; Moulins, France
- Died: 18 March 1805 (aged 48); Paris, France
- Occupations: Writer, playwright, translator
- Writing career
- Language: French

Antoine Gilbert Griffet de Labaume (21 November 1756 – 18 March 1805) was an 18th-century French writer, playwright and translator. Born in Moulins, Allier, he died in Paris aged 48.

== Biography ==
Griffet de Labaume was well educated, and learned English, German, and Italian. He obtained employment at the Interior Ministry, and made several translations, the income from which supplemented his wealth, which was quite modest. When his job was taken from him, he lost his fortune. Some other sorrows added to this unfortunate event.

The first work he translated was the novel The Effusions of Friendship and Fancy by Langhorne, followed by Daniel by Friedrich Karl von Moser, translated from German in 1787; Reflections on the abolition of the negro slave trade, translated from English in 1788; Common Sense by Thomas Paine, translated from English in 1790; Marianne et Charlotte by Tunger, translated from German in 1794, 3 volumes; Léopoldine, or Les Enfans perdus et retrouvés by Fr. Schulz, also from German; Tableaux du Déluge, after Johann Jakob Bodmer in 1797; the second volume of Swiss History by Johannes von Müller translated from German, 1797 in 8 volumes; Die Geschichte der Abderiten by Christoph Martin Wieland, translated from German in 1802, 3 volumes; l'Aperçu statistique des États d'Allemagne by Hoek, translated from German; Le Voyage en Afrique by Friedrich Hornemann, translated from English in 1803, two parts; Recherches asiatiques in 1805, 2 volumes; Anna Bella, or Barham Downs by Henry Mackenzie, translated from English in 1810, 4 volumes. He also translated various poems from English, among others several pieces from poet Thomas Chatterton; Quelques vers in 1785.

He worked for several newspapers, including the Mercure de France, the Décade philosophique, and the Magasin encyclopédique: volume 3, 7th ann., t. I, (p. 203). The last of these collections provides a notice on les Femmes auteurs de la Grande-Bretagne (Britain's Women Authors).

In addition, he left two comedies and some light poetry: Galatée, in one act and in verse, and Agathis in prose and in verse; la Messe de Gnide, by G. Nobody, Geneva, 1797; The Life of Daniel Defoe, author of Robinson Crusoe (the beginning of the Panckoucke edition, 1799, 3 volumes).

== Sources ==
- Antoine-Vincent Arnault, Biographie nouvelle des contemporains, vol. 2, Paris, Ledentu, (pp. 212–213).
- Georges Touchard-Lafosse, La Loire historique, pittoresque et biographique, Paris, Adolphe Delahays, 1858, (p. 374).
