= Kraushaar =

Kraushaar is a German surname, composed of two words: "kraus" meaning crinkly and "haar" meaning hair. Notable people with the surname include:

- Bob Kraushaar (born 1962), English record producer
- Elmar Kraushaar (born 1950), German journalist
- Karina Kraushaar (1971–2015), German actress
- Otto Kraushaar (1812–1866), German musician, writer and composer
- Otto Kraushaar (1901–1989), American academic
- Raoul Kraushaar (1908–2001), American composer
- Wolfgang Kraushaar (born 1948), German political scientist and historian

== See also ==
- Silke Kraushaar-Pielach, German luger
