= Simone Schneider =

German operatic soprano

- Born: 1971 (age 54–55); Hagen
- Education: Musikhochschule München
- Occupation: Operatic soprano
- Organizations: Staatstheater am Gärtnerplatz; Staatsoper Stuttgart
- Awards: Kammersängerin

Simone Schneider (born 1971) is a German operatic soprano. As a member of Staatstheater am Gärtnerplatz, she performed coloratura roles such as the Mozart's Queen of the Night. As a member of the Staatsoper Stuttgart from 2006, she has performed a wide range of leading roles including Donizetti's Maria Stuarda and the Feldmarschallin in Der Rosenkavalier by Richard Strauss. She performed as a guest in major opera houses in Germany and Europe.

== Career ==
Born in Hagen, Schneider studied at the Musikhochschule München. She first joined the ensemble of the Staatstheater am Gärtnerplatz in the 1997/98 season, where she performed roles such as the Queen of the Night in Mozart's Die Zauberflöte, Konstanze in his Die Entführung aus dem Serail, and Zerbinetta in Ariadne auf Naxos by Richard Strauss. She has been a member of the Staatsoper Stuttgart from the 2006/07 season, where she appeared as Donna Anna in Mozart's Don Giovanni, as Giunia in his Lucio Silla, as Elettra in his Idomeneo, as the Countess in his Le nozze di Figaro, as Rosalinde in Die Fledermaus by Johann Strauss, as Madame Lidoine in Poulenc's Dialogues des Carmélites, in the title role of Donizetti's Maria Stuarda, as Chrysothemis in Elektra, as Gutrune in Wagner's Götterdämmerung, as Alice Ford in Verdi's Falstaff, and as the Feldmarschallin in Der Rosenkavalier by Richard Strauss.

In 2008, she performed the title role of Alceste by Anton Schweitzer on the occasion of the reopening after the fire of the Duchess Anna Amalia Library. The recorded performance was played by Concerto Köln on period instruments and conducted by Michael Hofstetter. A reviewer of the recording for Gramophone wrote: "Simone Schneider variously expresses Alcestis's agitation, nobility and joy with a moving simplicity." In 2011, Schneider appeared at the Richard Strauss Festival in Garmisch-Partenkirchen as Christine in concerts of Intermezzo by Richard Strauss, with the Münchner Rundfunkorchester conducted by Ulf Schirmer. In 2014, she performed the part of Diemut in Feuersnot by Richard Strauss in concert in Munich, the composer's hometown. She sang alongside Markus Eiche as Kunrad, with choir and orchestra of the broadcaster Bayerischer Rundfunk, conducted by Schirmer. Schneider appeared in 2014 at the Leipzig Opera as the Empress in Die Frau ohne Schatten by Richard Strauss. A reviewer wrote: "Schneider was a headstrong, vibrant Empress. Her vivacity, mellifluous voice and seemingly inexhaustible reserves of energy created a generously scaled performance that was deeply moving."

Schneider was awarded the title Kammersängerin in 2016.
