= I. polymorpha =

I. polymorpha may refer to:

- Iguanura polymorpha, a Southeast Asian palm
- Ipomoea polymorpha, a morning glory
- Iresine polymorpha, an amaranth native to the American tropics
