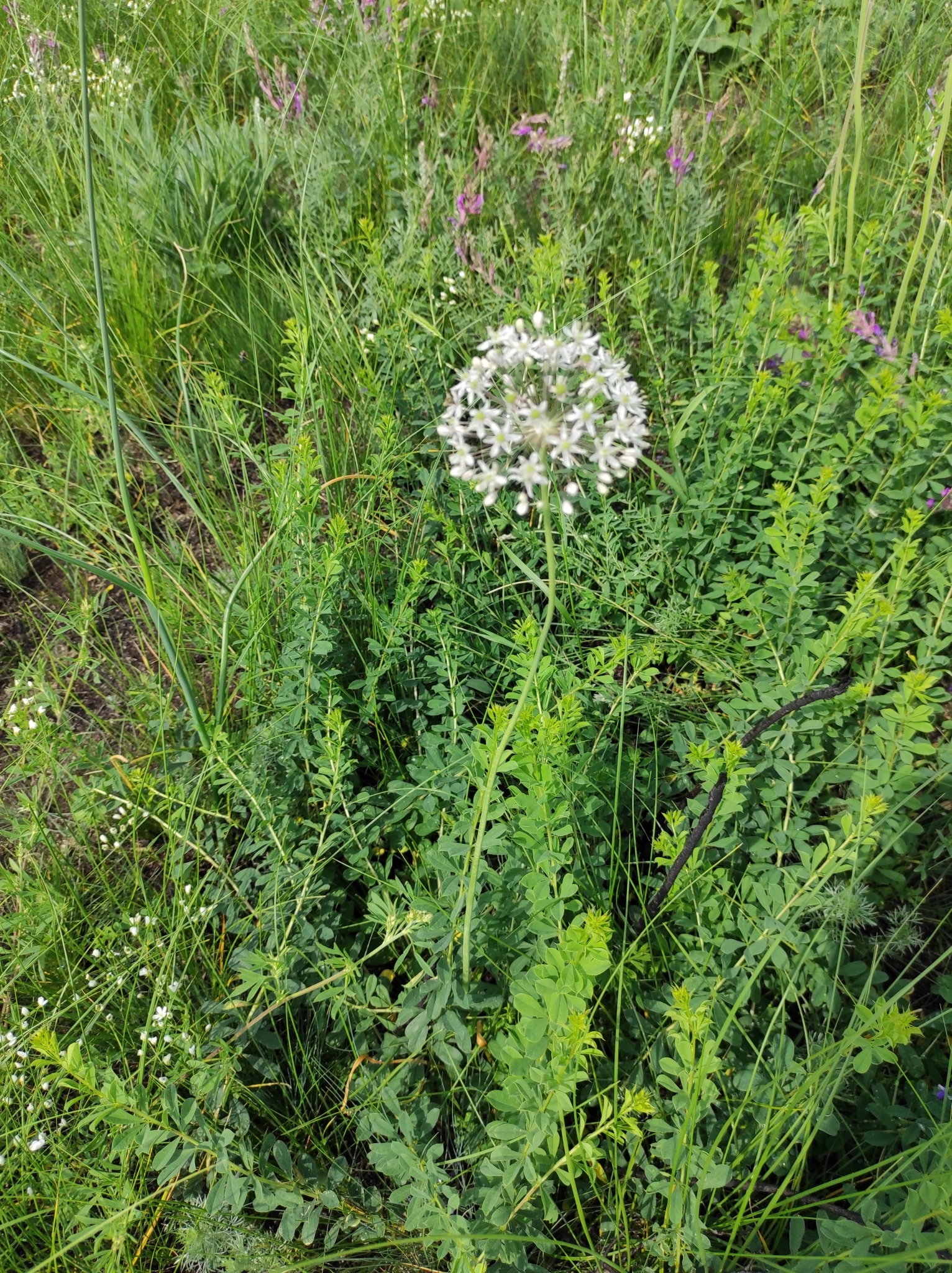

Scientific classification
- Kingdom: Plantae
- Clade: Tracheophytes
- Clade: Angiosperms
- Clade: Monocots
- Order: Asparagales
- Family: Amaryllidaceae
- Subfamily: Allioideae
- Genus: Allium
- Subgenus: Allium subg. Melanocrommyum
- Species: A. decipiens

Binomial name
- Allium decipiens Fisch. ex Roem. & Schult not M.E.Jones 1902

Synonyms
- Allium moly Georgi 1779, illegitimate homonym not L. 1753; Allium nigrum M.Bieb. 1808, illegitimate homonym not L. 1762 nor Sm. 1823 nor All. 1785; Allium bifolium Willd. ex Schult. & Schult.f.; Allium chloranthum Avé-Lall. ex Regel, not validly published

= Allium decipiens =

Species of flowering plant

Allium decipiens is a Eurasian species of garlic in the amaryllis family native to eastern Europe and western Asia.

Allium decipiens has a spherical bulb. The Scape can go up to 100 cm tall. The leaves are flat and linear-lanceolate. The Umbel is hemispherical with many flowers crowded together. The Tepals are whitish with a dark green midvein. The Ovary is green.

subspecies

- Allium decipiens subsp. decipiens - Ukraine, European Russia, Western Siberia, Altay Krai, Caucasus, Turkey
- Allium decipiens subsp. quercetorum Seregin - Crimea, northwestern Caucasus
