= Friedrich Karl von Moser =

German jurist, state journalist and politician

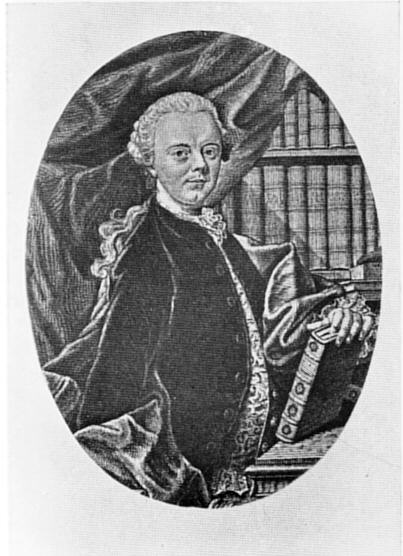
Friedrich Karl von Moser.

Baron Friedrich Karl von Moser Filseck (born 18 December 1723 in Stuttgart; died 11 November 1798 in Ludwigsburg) was a German jurist, state journalist and a politician.

Moser was the eldest son of Johann Jacob Moser. He was educated in the Pietist tradition at Kloster Berge school. He studied law in Jena, and in 1743 became an assistant to his father, a lawyer and diplomat. Between 1747-67 and 1782–98, he was an active writer and journalist.

From 1751-67 Moser lived in Frankfurt. In 1769 he was made a baron. In 1772 he was appointed as First Minister by Ludwig IX. He reorganised the finances of the state, which had accumulated heavy debts. Moser reached a settlement of these debts. His autocratic style of government made him many enemies. He resigned in 1780, and returned to writing.

From 1783-90 Moser lived in Mannheim, then in Ludwigsburg.

== Publications ==
- Teutsche Hofrecht (1754).
- Der Christ in der Freundschaft (1754).
- Der Herr und der Diener, geschildert mit patriotischer Freiheit (1759).
- Der Hof in Fabeln (1761).
- Die Ministerschule (1762).
- Daniel in der Löwen-Grube (1763). Translated into French by Antoine Gilbert Griffet de Labaume in 1787.
- Geistliche Gedichte (1763).
- Gesammelte Moralische und Politische Schriften (1763).
- Von dem Deutschen Nationalgeist (1765).
- Patriotische Briefe (1767).
- Necker (1782).
- Über Regenten, Regierung und Ministers (1784).
- Über den Diensthandel Deutscher Fürsten (1786).
- Über die Regierung der Geistlichen Staaten in Deutschland (1787).
- Politische Wahrheiten (1796).
- Actenmäßige Geschichte der Waldenser (1798).

Works in English translation

- In James Schmidt (ed.), What is Enlightenment? Berkeley: University of California Press, 1996.
  - "Publicity," pp. 114–118.
  - "True and False Political Enlightenment," pp. 212–216.
