= Christoph Martin Wieland =

German poet and writer (1733–1813)

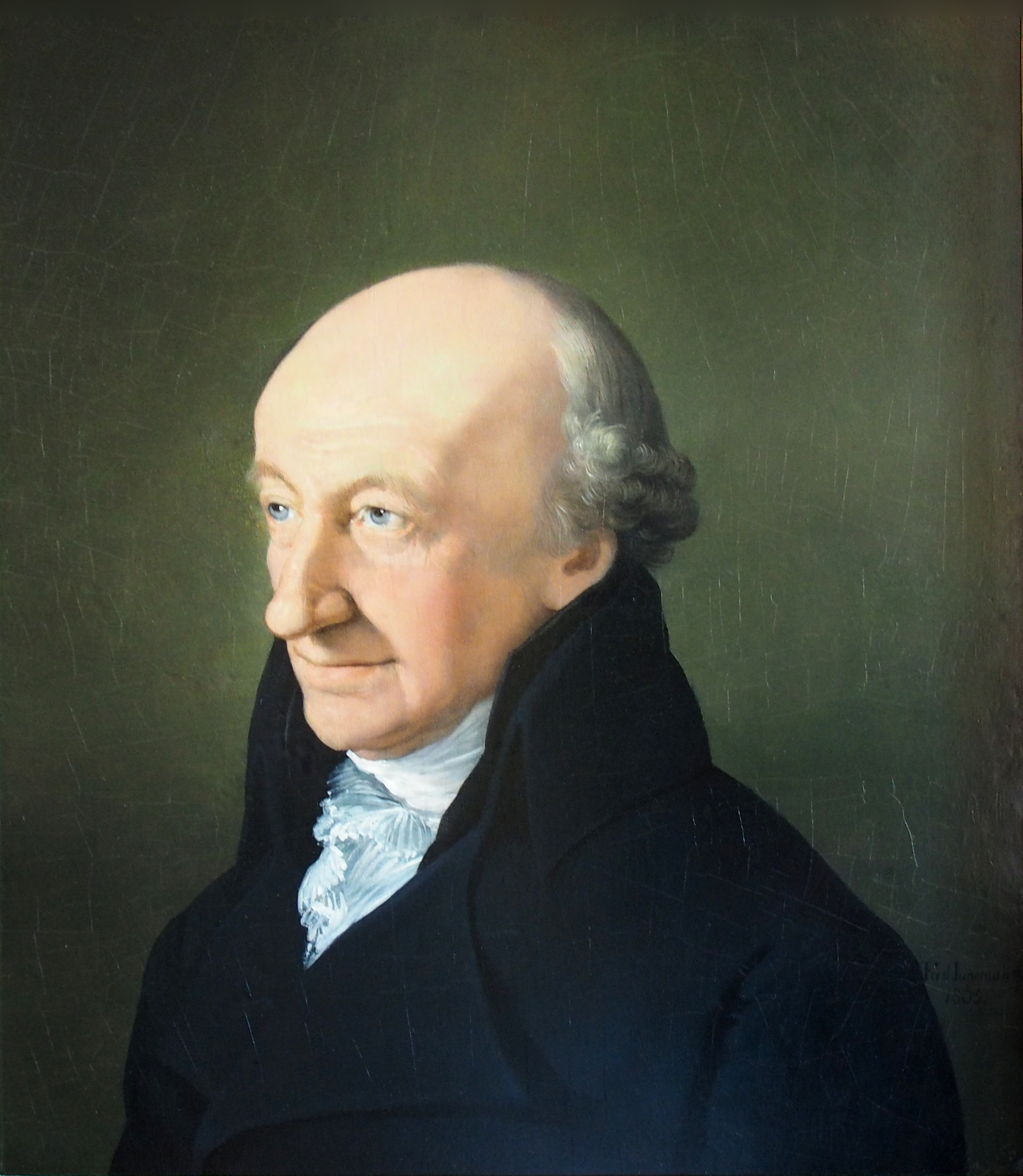
1805 portrait of Christoph Martin Wieland by Ferdinand Jagemann

Christoph Martin Wieland (/ˈviːlɑːnt/; German: [ˈviːlant]; 5 September 1733 – 20 January 1813) was a German poet and writer, representative of literary Rococo. He is best-remembered for having written the first Bildungsroman (Geschichte des Agathon), as well as the epic Oberon, which formed the basis for both Friederike Sophie Seyler's opera of the same name and Carl Maria von Weber's opera of the same name. His thought was representative of the cosmopolitanism of the German Enlightenment, exemplified in his remark: "Only a true cosmopolitan can be a good citizen." He was a key figure of Weimar Classicism and a collaborator of Abel Seyler's theatre company.

== Biography ==
Christoph Martin Wieland was born in Oberholzheim (now part of Achstetten), half of which then belonged to the Free Imperial City of Biberach an der Riss and the other half to Gutenzell Abbey in the south-east of the modern-day state of Baden-Württemberg.

His father, who was pastor in Oberholzheim and subsequently in Biberach, took great pains with his son's education. From the town school of Biberach, he passed on at the age of twelve to the Kloster Berge gymnasium, near Magdeburg. He was a precocious child, and when he left school in 1749 was widely read in the Latin classics and the leading contemporary French writers; amongst German poets his favourites were Brockes and Klopstock.

During the summer of 1750, he fell in love with a cousin, Sophie Gutermann, and this love affair inspired him to plan his first ambitious work, Die Natur der Dinge (The Nature of Things, 1752), a didactic poem in six books. In 1750 he went to the University of Tübingen as a student of law, but his time was mainly taken up with literary studies. The poems he wrote at the university—Hermann, an epic (published by F. Muncker, 1886), Zwölf moralische Briefe in Versen (Twelve Moral Letters in Verse, 1752), Anti-Ovid (1752)—are pietistic in tone and dominated by the influence of Klopstock.

Wieland's poetry attracted the attention of the Swiss literary reformer, J. J. Bodmer, who invited Wieland to visit him in Zürich in the summer of 1752. After a few months however, he felt little sympathy with Wieland as, two years earlier, he had felt himself with Klopstock, and the friends parted; but Wieland remained in Switzerland until 1760, spending the last year, at Bern where he obtained a position as private tutor. Here he became intimate with Jean-Jacques Rousseau's friend Julie de Bondeli.

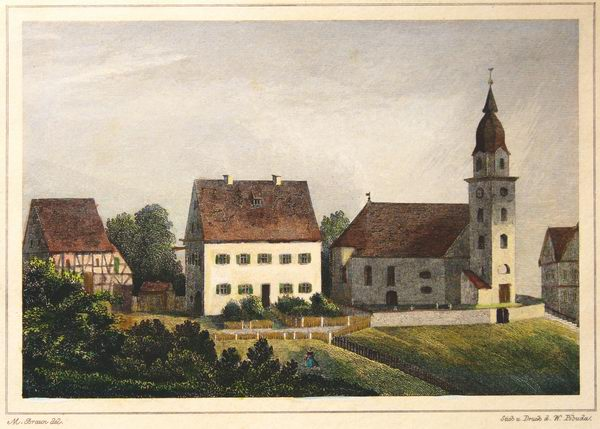
Birthplace of Christoph Martin Wieland in Oberholzheim (1840)

Wieland's tastes had changed; the writings of his early Swiss years—Der geprüfte Abraham (The Trial of Abraham's Faith, 1753), Sympathien (1756), Empfindungen eines Christen (1757)—were still in the manner of his earlier writings, but with the tragedies, Lady Johanna Gray (1758), and Clementina von Porretta (1760)—the latter based on Samuel Richardson's Sir Charles Grandison—the epic fragment Cyrus (first five cantos, 1759), and the "moral story in dialogues", Araspes und Panthea (1760), Wieland, as Gotthold Lessing said, "forsook the ethereal spheres to wander again among the sons of men." In Cyrus, he had been inspired by the deeds of Frederick the Great to write a poem exhibiting the ideal of a hero. Araspes und Panthea is based on an episode from the Cyropaedia of Xenophon.

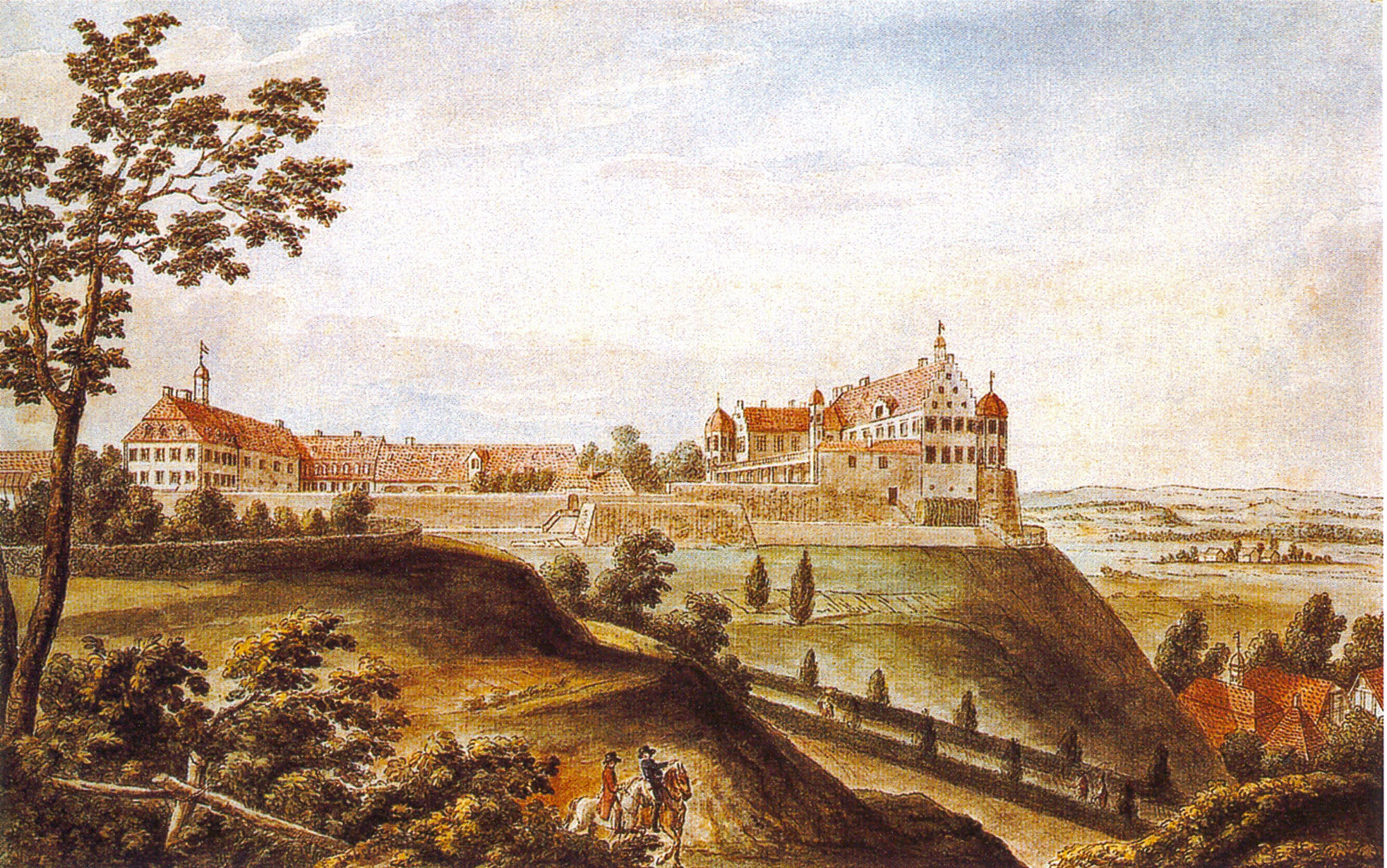
View of Schloss Warthausen by Johann Heinrich Tischbein (1781)

Wieland's conversion was completed at Biberach, having returned in 1760 as director of the chancery. The monotony of his life here was relieved by the friendship of a Count Stadion, whose library in the castle of Warthausen, not far from Biberach, was well stocked with French and English literature. Wieland met again his early love Sophie Gutermann, who had become the wife of Hofrat La Roche, then manager of Count Stadion's estates.

In Don Sylvio von Rosalva (1764), a romance in imitation of Don Quixote, he held his earlier faith up to ridicule and in the Comische Erzählungen (1765) he gave his extravagant imagination only too free a rein.

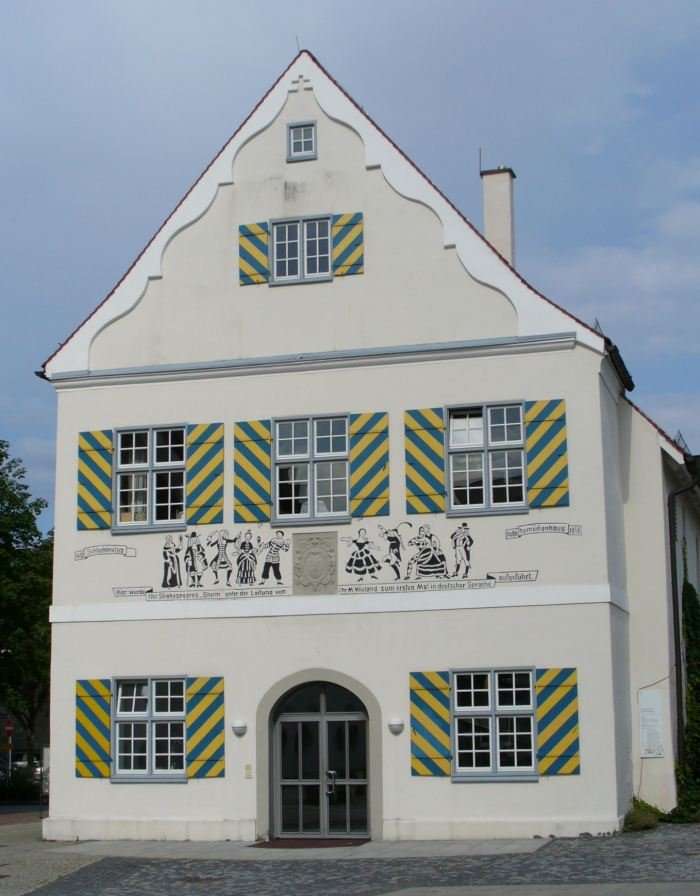
Former Komödienhaus in der Schlachtmetzig in Biberach an der Riss where in 1762, The Tempest (Shakespeare), translated by Christoph Martin Wieland, was performed for the first time in Germany

More important is the novel Geschichte des Agathon (1766–1767), in which, under the guise of a Greek fiction, Wieland described his own spiritual and intellectual growth. This work, which Lessing recommended as "a novel of classic taste", marks an epoch in the development of the modern psychological novel. Of equal importance was Wieland's translation of twenty-two of Shakespeare's plays into prose (8 vols., 1762–1766); it was the first attempt to present the English poet to the German people in something approaching entirety. With the poems Musarion oder die Philosophie der Grazien (1768), Idris (1768), Combabus (1770), Der neue Amadis (1771), Wieland opened the series of light and graceful romances in verse which appealed so irresistibly to his contemporaries and acted as an antidote to the sentimental excesses of the subsequent Sturm und Drang movement. Musarion advocates a rational unity of the sensual and spiritual; Amadis celebrates the triumph of intellectual over physical beauty.

Wieland married Anna Dorothea von Hillenbrand (July 8, 1746 – November 9, 1801) on October 21, 1765. They had 14 children. Wieland's daughter Sophia Catharina Susanna Wieland (October 19, 1768 – September 1, 1837) married philosopher Karl Leonhard Reinhold (1757–1823) on May 18, 1785.

Between 1769 and 1772, Wieland was a professor of philosophy at the University of Erfurt. In his Verklagter Amor ("Cupid Accused") he defended amatory poetry; and in the Dialogen des Diogenes von Sinope (1770) he gave a general vindication of his philosophical views.

In 1772 he published Der goldene Spiegel oder die Könige van Scheschian, a pedagogic work in the form of oriental stories; this attracted the attention of Duchess Anna Amalia of Brunswick-Wolfenbüttel, and resulted in his appointment as tutor to her two sons, the Duke Karl August and his brother Prince Constantin, at Weimar. With the exception of some years spent at Ossmannstedt, where in later life he bought an estate, Weimar remained Wieland's home until his death. Turning his attention to dramatic poetry, he wrote opera librettos such as Wahl des Hercules ("Choice of Hercules") and Alceste by Anton Schweitzer.

In 1773, he founded Der teutsche Merkur, which under his editorship (1773–1789) became the most influential literary review in Germany. His views, as exhibited therein, however, showed so much of the narrow conventional spirit of French criticism, that he was attacked by Goethe in the satire Götter, Helden und Wieland ("Gods, Heroes and Wieland"). This Wieland answered with great good nature, recommending it to all who were fond of wit and sarcasm. Goethe and Johann Gottfried Herder were soon drawn to Weimar, where the Duchess Anna Amalia formed a circle of talent and genius, later also joined by Friedrich Schiller.

Politically, Wieland was a moderate liberal who advocated a constitutional monarchy, a free press, and a middle path between extremes of left and right. At least three of his works, Geschichte des Agathon, Der goldene Spiegel oder die Könige van Scheschian, and Beiträge zur geheimen Geschichte des menschlichen Verstandes und Herzens, found themselves on the official Bavarian Illuminati reading list. Wieland also explored the role of secret societies in Enlightenment thought in Das Geheimnis des Kosmopoliten-Ordens (1788). This work examines the political and philosophical implications of clandestine organizations, particularly their potential to form a "state within a state". A modern English edition, The Secret of the Order of Cosmopolitans, was published in 2025, making the text accessible to a wider audience.

He was also a librettist for the Seyler theatrical company of Abel Seyler. Of his later writings the most important are the admirable satire on German provinciality—the most attractive of all his prose writings—Die Abderiten, eine sehr wahrscheinliche Geschichte (A very probable history of the Abderites, 1774), (translated into French by Antoine Gilbert Griffet de Labaume) and the charming poetic romances, Das Wintermärchen (1776), Das Sommermärchen (1777), Geron der Adelige (1777), Pervonte oder die Wünsche (1778), a series culminating with Wieland's poetic masterpiece, the romantic epic of Oberon (1780). In 1780 he created the singspiel Rosamunde with the composer Anton Schweitzer.

In Wieland's later novels, such as the Geheime Geschichte des Philosophen Peregrinus Proteus (1791) and Aristipp und einige seiner Zeitgenossen (1800–1802), a didactic and philosophic tendency obscures the small literary interest they possess. He also translated Horace's Satires (1786), Lucian's Works (1788–1789), Cicero's Letters (1808 ff.), and from 1796 to 1803 he edited the Attisches Museum which did valuable service in popularizing Greek studies. Wieland was also strongly influenced by the French fairy-tale vogue of the 18th century; he published a collection of tales entitled Dschinnistan (1786–1789), which included three original tales, 'Der Stein der Weisen' ('The Philosopher's Stone'), 'Timander und Melissa', and 'Der Druide oder die Salamanderin und die Bildsäule' ('The Druid or the Salamander and the Painted Pillar').

Wieland died in Weimar. He had a strong influence on the German literature of his time.

== Works ==
Wieland was a prolific writer, publishing novels, poetry, plays, and philosophical treatises. His works contributed significantly to the literary and intellectual movements of the Enlightenment and Weimar Classicism.

=== Major works ===
- Der geprüfte Abraham (1753)
- Geschichte des Agathon (1766–1767)
- Don Sylvio von Rosalva (1764)
- Musarion oder die Philosophie der Grazien (1768)
- Der neue Amadis (1771)
- Die Abderiten, eine sehr wahrscheinliche Geschichte (1774)
- Oberon (1780)
- Dschinnistan (1786–1789)
- Das Geheimnis des Kosmopoliten-Ordens (1788) → The Secret of the Order of Cosmopolitans
- Aristipp und einige seiner Zeitgenossen (1800–1802)

=== Collected editions ===
Wieland's complete works were widely republished in collected editions, some of which included critical annotations and commentary.

==== Sämtliche Werke ====
- Sämtliche Werke (1794–1802, 45 vols.) – Edited by Ludwig Wieland (1815) and H. Gessner (1815–1816)
- Later editions:
  - 1818–1828, 53 vols.
  - 1839–1840, 36 vols.
  - 1853–1858, 36 vols.
  - 1879–1882, 40 vols. (edited by H. Düntzer)
- Selected works published in Kürschner's Deutsche Nationalliteratur (vols. 51–56, 1883–1887), edited by Heinrich Pröhle
- Further selections by F. Muncker (6 vols., 1889) and W. Bolsche (4 vols., 1902)

==== Gesammelte Schriften ====
- Edited by Deutsche Kommission der Königlich Preußischen Akademie der Wissenschaften (1909–1975)
- Two sections:
  - Abt. I: Werke
  - Abt. II: Übersetzungen
- Later edited by the German Academy of Sciences at Berlin (1945), Akademie der Wissenschaften der DDR (1969), Hans Werner Seiffert, and others.
- Includes volumes with and without commentary.
- Some volumes remain missing from the edition.

==== Correspondence and critical editions ====
- Wielands Briefwechsel (20 volumes, 1963–2007) – Edited by the German Academy of Sciences at Berlin, later by Berlin-Brandenburgische Akademie der Wissenschaften
- Wielands Werke. Historisch-kritische Ausgabe (since 2008) – Edited by Klaus Manger and Jan Philipp Reemtsma, published in Berlin/New York.
