= Carl Friedrich Christian Fasch =

German composer and harpsichordist

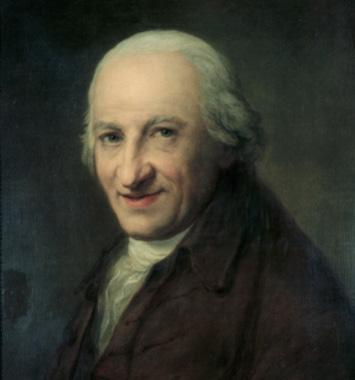
- Portrait of Carl Friedrich Christian Fasch by Anton Graff
- Born: Zerbst
- Died: 3 August 1800 (aged 63); Vienna
- Occupations: composer; harpsichordist

Carl Friedrich Christian Fasch (1736–1800) was a German composer and harpsichordist. Born in Zerbst, he was the son of the composer Johann Friedrich Fasch. He was initially taught by his father.

In 1756 he began service at the court of Frederick the Great of Prussia, where he served as deputy to Court harpsichordist C.P.E. Bach, whose post he attained when Bach left the court for Hamburg in 1767. In 1791 he founded the Sing-Akademie in Berlin which quickly became an important centre of Berlin's musical life. In its concerts Fasch promoted the music of J.S. Bach and other masters of the Baroque period, as well as contemporary music. The Akademie was visited by Beethoven in 1796. Fasch also composed numerous works for the Sing-Akademie. His Mass for sixteen voices, a virtuosic mass accompanied solely by organ continuo, is a choral masterpiece of the late 18th century.

Fasch died in Berlin in 1800. His grave is preserved in the Protestant Friedhof I der Jerusalems- und Neuen Kirchengemeinde (Cemetery No. I of the congregations of Jerusalem's Church and New Church) in Berlin-Kreuzberg, south of Hallesches Tor. He was succeeded as head of the Akademie by Carl Friedrich Zelter.

== Life ==
=== Education ===
As a child he was delicate, and much indulged. He made rapid progress on the violin and clavier, and in the rudiments of harmony. After a short stay at Coethen, where he made his first attempts at composition in church-music, he was sent to Strelitz. Here he continued his studies under Hertel, in all branches of music, but especially in accompaniment, at that time a difficult art, as the accompanist had only the figured bass to guide him. In 1751 Linicke, the court clavierist, having declined to accompany Franz Benda, Fasch offered to supply his place at the harpsichord, and Benda’s praises incited him to still greater efforts. After his return to Zerbst, he was sent to complete his education at Klosterbergen near Magdeburg. Benda had not forgotten their meeting, and in 1756, when just twenty, Fasch was appointed on his recommendation accompanist to Frederick the Great. His coadjutor was no less a person than Carl Philipp Emanuel Bach; they took it in turns to accompany the King’s flute-concertos, and as soon as Fasch had become accustomed to the royal amateur's impetuous style of execution, his accompaniments gave every satisfaction.

=== Times of war ===
The Seven Years' War put an end to Frederick’s flute-playing, and as Fasch received his salary (300 thalers) in paper, worth only a fifth part of its nominal value— a misfortune in which he anticipated Beethoven—he was compelled to maintain himself by giving lessons. For his lessons in composition, he made a collection of several thousand examples. About the same time he wrote several most ingenious canons, particularly one for twenty-five voices containing five canons put together, one being in seven parts, one in six, and three in four parts. After the Battle of Torgau, the King granted him an addition of 100 thalers to his salary, but the increase covered the direction of the opera, which was put into his hands from 1774 to 1776. After the War of the Bavarian Succession Frederick gave up his practice, and Fasch was free to follow his natural inclination for church music.

=== Sing-Akademie ===
In 1783, excited by a 16-part Mass of Benevoli's, which Reichardt had brought from Italy, he wrote one for the same number of voices, which, however, proved too difficult for the court-singers. He retained his post after Frederick's death but occupied himself chiefly with composition and teaching. In the summer of 1790, as he himself tells us, he began choral-meetings in the summer-house of Geheimrath Milow, which resulted in the Singakademie, an institution which under his pupil and successor Zelter became very popular and exercised an important influence on musical taste in Berlin for many years.

=== Beethoven's visits to Fasch ===
Before his death, Fasch was twice visited by Beethoven, who spent some time in Berlin in the summer of 1796. On the first occasion, June 21, he heard a chorale, the three first numbers of Fasch's mass, and several movements from his 119th Psalm, and he himself extemporized on one of the subjects of the latter. On the 28th he reappeared and again extemporized, to the delight of Fasch's scholars, who, as Beethoven used to say, pressed round him and could not applaud for tears (Thayer's Beethoven, ii. 13).The Academy at that date was about 90 strong, but at the time of Fasch's death, Aug. 3, 1800, it had increased to 147. In accordance with a wish expressed in his will, the Academy performed Mozart's Requiem to his memory—for the first time in Berlin. The receipts amounted to 1200 thalers, an extraordinary sum in those days, and were applied to founding a Fund for the perpetual maintenance of a poor family.

== Publications of Fasch's work ==
In 1801 Zelter published his Life—a brochure of 62 pages 4to., with a portrait. In 1839 the Academy published Fasch's best sacred works in 6 volumes. A 7th, issued by the representatives of Zelter, contains the mass and the canon above alluded to. Of his oratorio Giuseppe riconosciuto, performed in 1774, one terzetto alone remains, Fasch having destroyed the rest, together with several other works composed before the 16-part mass. As a master of composition in many parts, Fasch is the last representative of the great school of sacred composers that lasted so long in Italy. His works combine the severity of ancient forms with modern harmony and a fine vein of melody.
