= Rosamunde (Schweitzer) =

Rosamunde is a singspiel in three acts by Anton Schweitzer to a German-language libretto by Christoph Martin Wieland, first performed on 20 January 1780 at the Nationaltheater Mannheim. The singspiel was revived by the 60th Schwetzingen Festival in 2012 in a production by Jens-Daniel Herzog.
