= Alceste (Schweitzer) =

Opera by Anton Schweitzer and Christoph Martin Wieland

- Opera by Anton Schweitzer
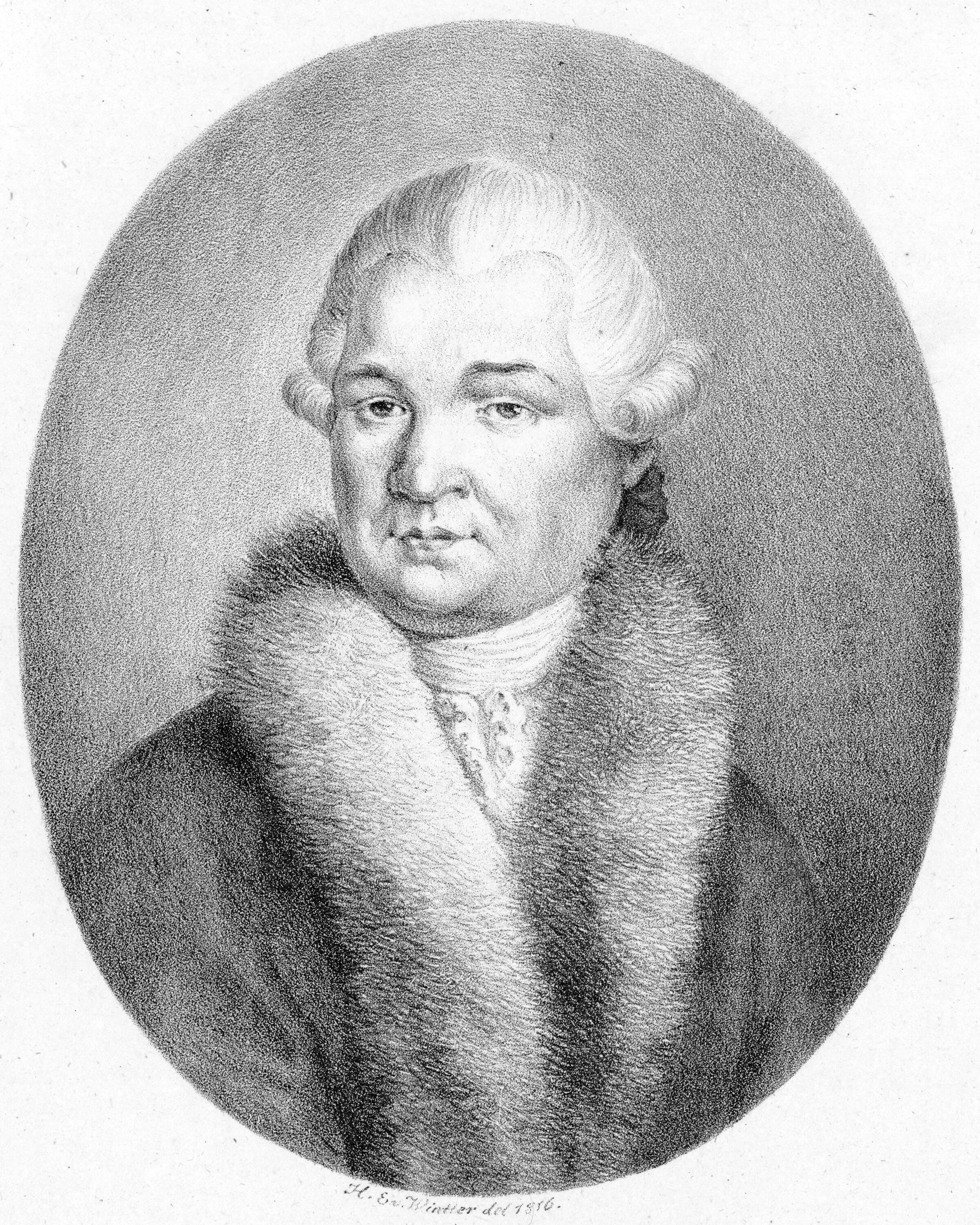
- Anton Schweitzer, the composer
- Librettist: Christoph Martin Wieland
- Language: German
- Premiere: 28 May 1773; Hoftheater Weimar

Alceste is an opera in German in five acts by Anton Schweitzer with a libretto by Christoph Martin Wieland. It was commissioned by Abel Seyler for the Seylersche Schauspiel-Gesellschaft, and premiered on 28 May 1773 at the Hoftheater Weimar. Considered a milestone of German opera, it was revived in Weimar and recorded in 1999.

== History ==
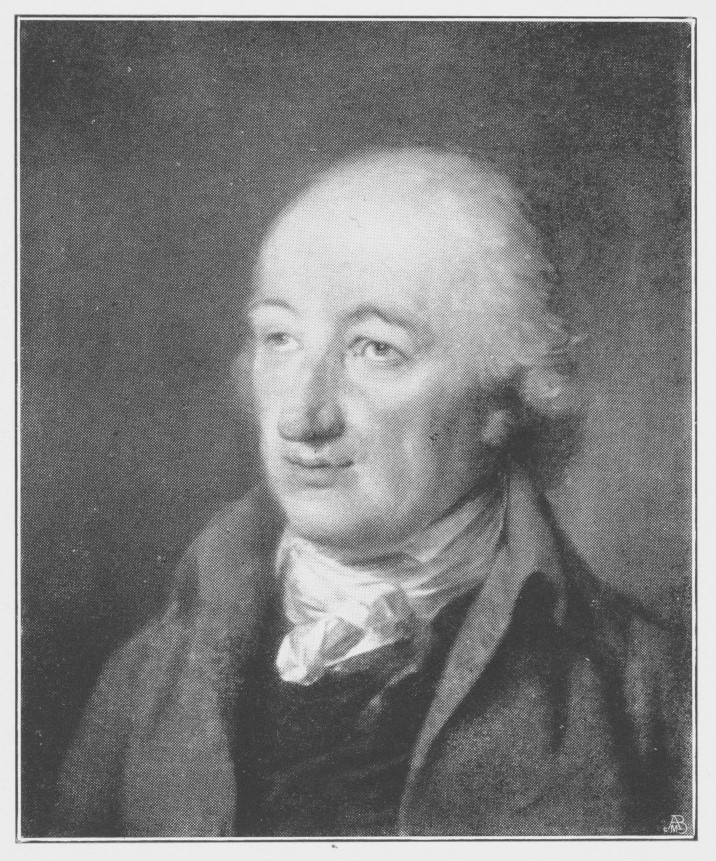
Christoph Martin Wieland, the poet and librettist

Alceste was commissioned by Abel Seyler for the Seylersche Schauspiel-Gesellschaft. He was a strong proponent of German opera. Anton Schweitzer worked as a musical director for the company since 1769. The opera was an effort to found a German opera style, while earlier operas in German had relied on Italian and French traditions, for example the lost Dafne by Heinrich Schütz, and the first extant opera in German, Das geistliche Waldgedicht oder Freudenspiel, genannt Seelewig by Sigmund Theophil Staden on a libretto by Georg Philipp Harsdörffer, which is closely related to works of the Renaissance.

The librettist and the composer had collaborated already for the ballets Idris und Zenide and Aurora, with Wieland compared to Metastasio. Wieland wrote several comments to the libretto of Alceste, including in his essay Versuch über das Deutsche Singspiel, explaining his intentions to Charles Burney who was surprised on his musical trips through France, Italy and Germany that he found now German lyrical theatre. Wieland's goal was an "interessante Art von Schauspielen" (a more interesting form of plays) with a focus on "Rührung" (emotional affect). Duchess Anna Amalie of Weimar wanted to establish a Nationalbühne, a stage for plays and operas in German. Early pieces for such a theatre were the Singspiele Die Jagd by Johann Adam Hiller and Die Dorfgala by Schweitzer. Wieland and Schweitzer wanted to create in Alceste a work that could compete internationally. The librettist reduced the number of characters to four, and employed no choir. The opera is regarded as a milestone of German opera.

== Performance, reception, recording ==
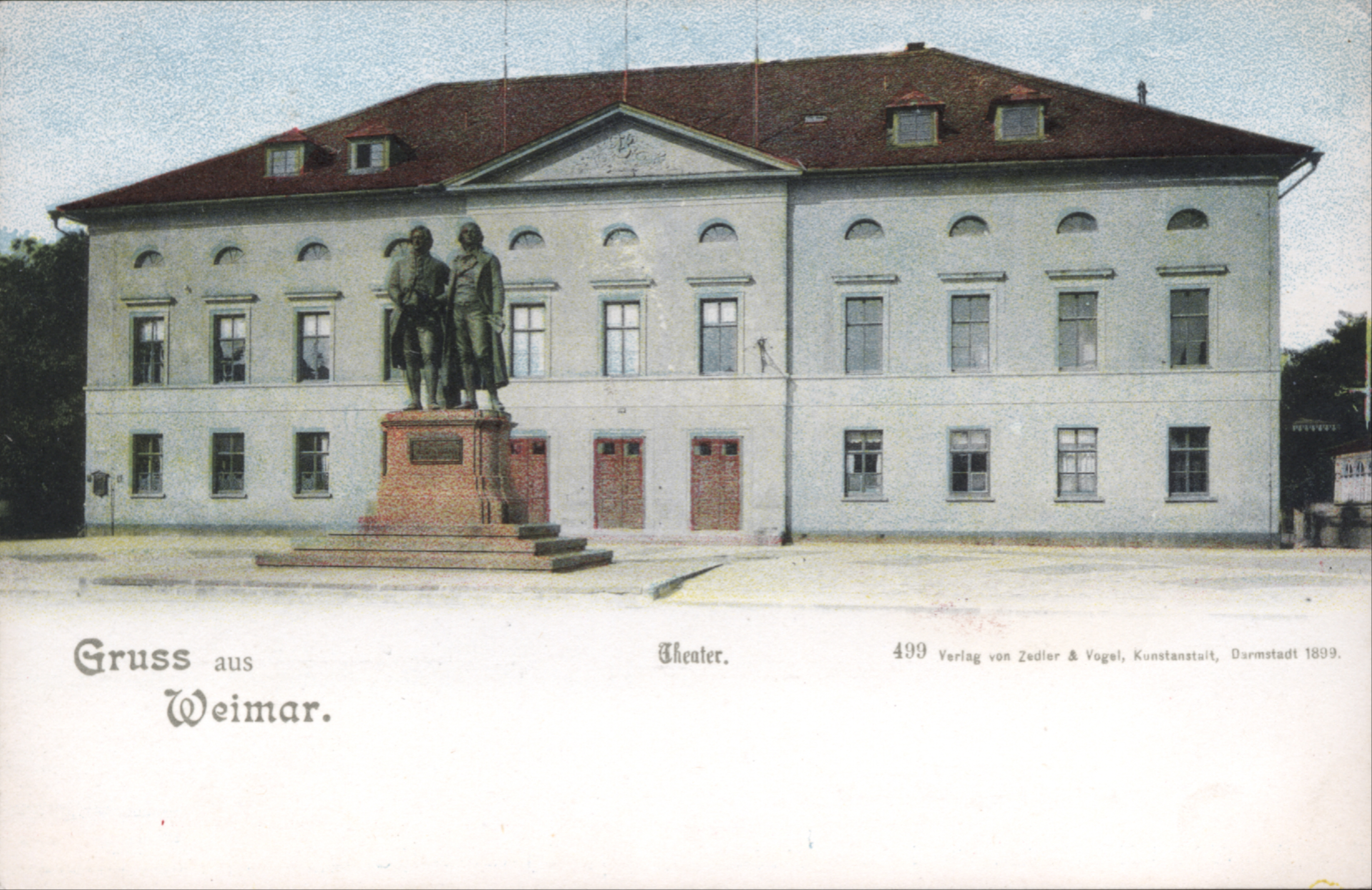
The Hoftheater Weimar on an 1899 postcard

The opera was premiered by the Seyler Company on 28 May 1773 at the Hoftheater Weimar, with Franziska Romana Koch in the title role, whose voice the composer had in mind when he wrote the opera. The librettist was so pleased with her performance that he wrote a poem to her.

Mozart wrote that "Alcestis was a great success, and that although it is not half so beautiful as [Schweitzer's] Rosamund. It is true that its success was much abetted by the fact that it was the first German opera." The opera singer, composer and musical theorist Ernst Christoph Dressler described the positive reception of the opera in Weimar in his 1774 book Gedanken Die Vorstellung Der Alceste, Ein Deutsches Ernsthaftes Singspiel (Thoughts on the Presentation of Alceste, a German Serious Opera). He considered it a model for German opera.

The opera was revived in Weimar in 1999, when the town was European Capital of Culture. Conducted by Stephan E. Wehr, it was staged in the Richard-Wagner-Saal of the Hotel Elephant, and broadcast live by Deutschlandfunk. Ideas and Impresario was the visual artist Cornel Wachter from Cologne. The ensemble, with Ursula Targler as Alceste, Sylvia Koke as Parthenia, Christian Voigt as Admet and Christoph Johannes Wendel as Herkules, with the Philharmonisches Orchester Erfurt and its chorus recorded the opera in 2001. Another recording was made in 2008 by Concerto Köln conducted by Michael Hofstetter on period instruments, with Simone Schneider, Cyndia Sieden, Christoph Genz and Josef Wagner. The DVD recorded a performance staged by Hendrik Müller in the Festsaal (festive hall) of Schloss Weimar, on the occasion of the reopening after the fire of the Duchess Anna Amalia Library.
