= Hans Michael Schletterer =

German musical administrator, conductor, composer and writer

Hans Michael Schletterer (29 May 1824 – 4 June 1893) was a German musical administrator, conductor, composer and writer on music. He was important in the musical life of Augsburg.

== Life ==
Schletterer was born in Ansbach in 1824, son of a tailor. After training at Kaiserslautern to be a teacher, he studied music in Kassel with Otto Kraushaar and Louis Spohr, and in Leipzig with Ferdinand David and Ernst Richter; he also studied in Dresden, Dessau and Berlin. He was a music teacher in Fénétrange; in 1847 he was a musical director in Zweibrücken. In 1853 he became musical director at the University of Heidelberg.

In 1858 he became Kapellmeister at the Protestant church in Augsburg, St Anne's Church. There he was organizer, choir conductor and composer. In 1866 he founded the Oratorio Society (Oratorienverein Augsburg); this gave subscription concerts of sacred works and orchestral works, and became important in the musical life of the city. In 1873 he founded the Music School in Augsburg (Augsburger Musikschule; it later became the Leopold Mozart Centre). In 1878 he was awarded an honorary degree Doctor of Philosophy at the University of Tübingen, for his works on the history of music.

Schletterer was musically conservative, and opposed to the followers of the music of Richard Wagner. The change in prevailing taste caused his resignation as conductor of the Oratorio Society, not long before his death.

He died in Augsburg in 1893. His wife, violinist Hortensia Zirges (a niece of Admiral Karl Rudolf Brommy) died in 1904.

=== Works ===
Schletterer composed mainly songs, cantatas and choral music. He published several books about the history of music, including Die Entstehung der Oper ("The Origin of Opera"; Nördlingen 1873); Studien zur Geschichte der französischen Musik ("Studies on the History of French Music"; Berlin 1884/85) and Die Ahnen moderner Musikwerke ("The Ancestors of Modern Musical Works"; Leipzig 1882).
