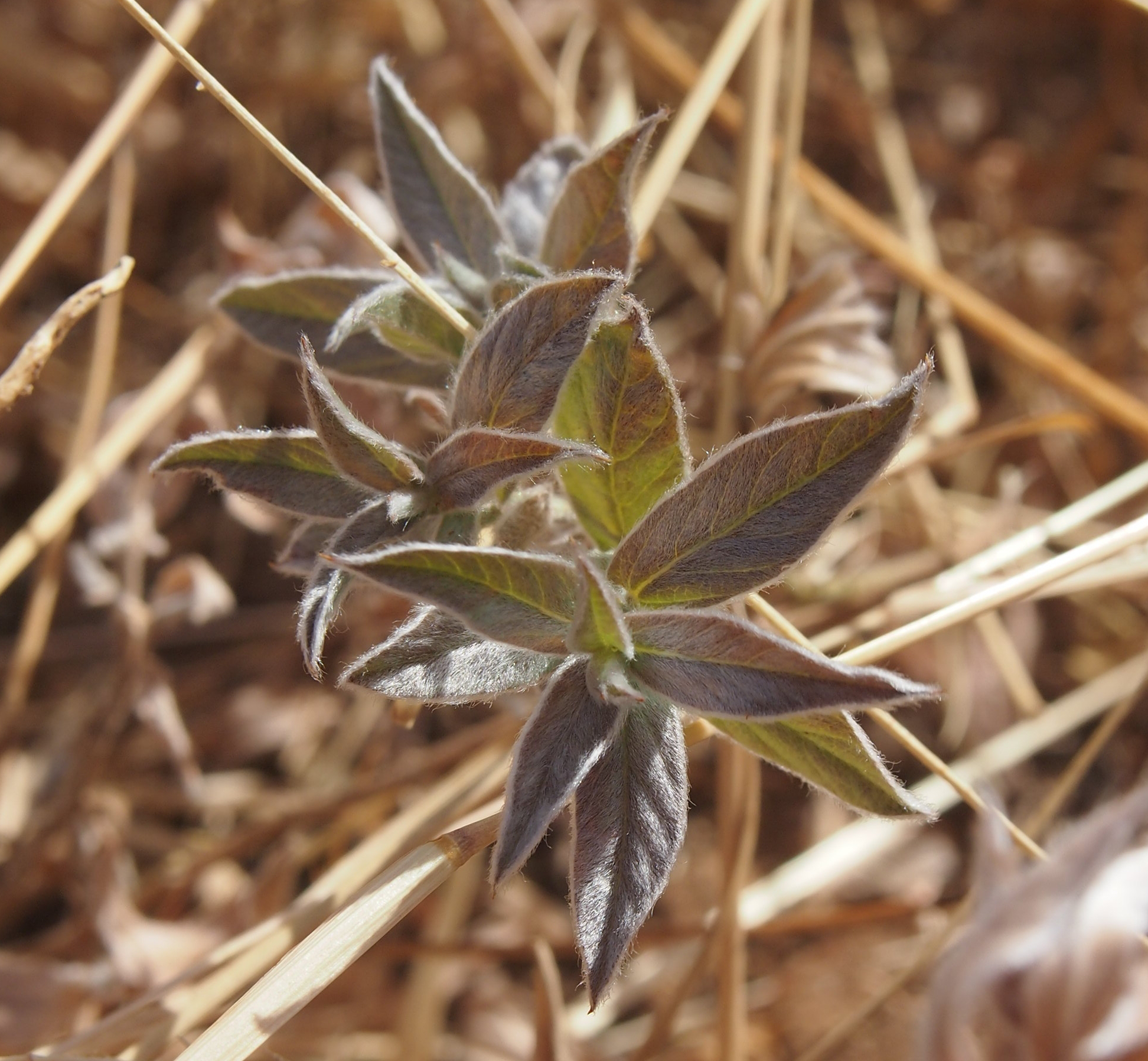

Scientific classification
- Kingdom: Plantae
- Clade: Tracheophytes
- Clade: Angiosperms
- Clade: Eudicots
- Clade: Asterids
- Order: Solanales
- Family: Convolvulaceae
- Genus: Ipomoea
- Species: I. polymorpha

Binomial name
- Ipomoea polymorpha Roemer & Schultes

Synonyms
- Convolvulus brownii Spreng. Convolvulus commatophyllus Steud. ex Choisy; Convolvulus defloratus Choisy; Convolvulus nolaniflorus Zippelius ex Spanoghe; Convolvulus robertianus Spreng. Ipomoea commatophylla A. Rich. Ipomoea heterophylla R. Br. Ipomoea pumila Span. Ipomoea tashiroi Matsum.

= Ipomoea polymorpha =

Species of flowering plant

Ipomoea polymorpha is a morning glory species that was first described by Swiss botanist Johann Jacob Roemer and Austrian botanist Josef August Schultes. It is endemic to Australia.
