= The Secret of the Order of Cosmopolitans =

The Secret of the Order of Cosmopolitans (German: Das Geheimnis des Kosmopoliten-Ordens) is a treatise published in 1788 by Christoph Martin Wieland, in which he critically examines secret societies and their influence on politics and society. The work is considered an important contribution to the debate on cosmopolitanism and Freemasonry during the Age of Enlightenment.

== Content ==
In this work, Wieland describes a fictional society, the "Order of Cosmopolitans," which differs from other secret organizations of the time. While groups such as the Bavarian Illuminati and certain Masonic lodges were known for their secrecy and political influence, Wieland's order emphasizes openness, reason, and universal humanity.

The text argues that a true cosmopolitan is not defined by secret rituals or exclusive knowledge but by their ability to see themselves as a citizen of a global community, transcending national and social boundaries. Wieland critically examines the idea that secret societies could establish a "state within a state," thereby undermining legitimate political structures.

== Reception ==
During its time, the book was seen as a critical reflection on the influence of secret societies on politics and morality. Wieland’s portrayal of cosmopolitanism has been linked to the ideas of Immanuel Kant, particularly his concept of "world citizenship" as part of a rational world order.

Modern scholarly analyses regard the book as a key text in the German debate on cosmopolitanism in the 18th century.

== Modern Editions ==
A modern English translation, titled The Secret of the Order of Cosmopolitans, was published in 2026, making the text accessible to a wider audience.
