= Kloster Berge school =

- Buckau; Magdeburg, Saxony-Anhalt; Germany

Information
- School type: Gymnasium
- Opened: mid-16th century
- Closed: 1810
- Enrollment: c.150

The Kloster Berge school or Berge monastery school was a gymnasium at the Kloster Berge (Berge Abbey or Berge Monastery) at Buckau on the outskirts of Magdeburg, Germany which was founded in the mid-16th century and during its heyday from 1660 to 1806 was known for the quality of its education.

== History ==
Both Thietmar of Merseburg in the 10th century and Herkus Monte in the 13th are said to have been educated at the monastery.

However, the first clear mention of boys being schooled there dates to 1563, and the actual school was founded as part of the re-establishment of the monastery beginning in 1559, after the Schmalkaldic War. During this period, in 1565, it also ceased to be a Benedictine abbey and became Lutheran like the city of Magdeburg. The formal opening of the school was therefore in 1565, as a Lutheran foundation. The school opened with 12 pupils, all on scholarship. At the outset, the teacher was paid 20 Thalers, 2 shirts, a pair of shoes and a pair of slippers per year plus bed and board. Instruction appears to have been restricted to the medieval trivium and quadrivium, and took place in the cloister of the parsonage until one schoolmaster hanged himself there and it was moved to a specially built round tower.

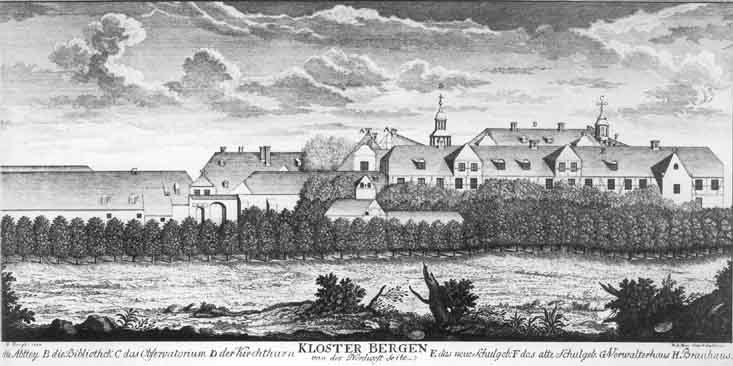
Kloster Berge seen from the northwest in 1780; the old school building is labelled E, the new school building F, and the observatory tower C

In 1625 Magdeburg was stricken by plague, parents withdrew their children, and the school was closed. The monastery was sacked and destroyed during the Thirty Years' War. The school was re-established in 1660 with 6 pupils and although an unsuccessful court case was brought against the abbot in 1665 for excessive disciplining of 3 unruly pupils, starting in 1686 it was enlarged and reorganised as a gymnasium, preparing pupils for university study with a curriculum of religion, mathematics, history, geography, rhetoric, logic, poetry, moral philosophy, ars humaniora and fine arts, and came to be regarded as one of Germany's best schools. It reached its height of fame in the mid-18th century, under Abbot Johann Adam Steinmetz. The school was particularly known for its instruction in ancient and modern languages. At that time the school had 40–50 new pupils a year and a total student body of over 150, and noble families from all over the Holy Roman Empire and beyond sent their sons to be educated there. Goethe visited the monastery and praised the school and Steinmetz.

The monastery had become a centre of Pietism; the school was closely associated with August Hermann Francke's Franckesche Stiftungen in Halle, and in 1735 an institute for the training of rural schoolteachers was founded. In 1750, after being denied official permission, Steinmetz with the assistance of some benefactors established a separate free school for 100 poor children of Magdeburg, in a house which he bought for the purpose.

Scientific research was also carried out at the monastery. In June 1761, Georg Christoph Silberschlag and Heinrich Wilhelm Bachmann detected the atmosphere of Venus at the monastery observatory.

The school declined starting in 1762 when Steinmetz' chosen successor as abbot proved unsatisfactory; he was authoritarian, sought to relate all instruction explicitly to the New Testament and reduced expenditure excessively, including cutting back on free places at the school, and teachers and pupils left. By Easter 1768 there were only 33 pupils. In contrast he spent freely on the teacher training institute. He was removed from leadership of the school by royal decree in 1770 and eventually also from his position as abbot. His successor introduced classes in technology and hired Johann Gottlieb Cunradi to teach the subject but was unable to restore the school's reputation; in 1784/5 a newspaper report stated, "The school has a very thoughtful director and some very able teachers—if only it also had pupils!"

During the Napoleonic Wars Magdeburg surrendered to the French, and in 1810 the Kingdom of Westphalia ordered the school to be closed. It was shut down on March 30, after educating 2,200 pupils since 1686. The monastery library and scientific collections were donated to Halle University and the school library sold at auction.

== Notable alumni ==
- Johann Christoph Adelung
- Carl Friedrich Fasch
- Ludwig Philipp vom Hagen
- Friedrich von Matthisson
- Friedrich Karl von Moser
- Stephan Schütze
- Christoph Martin Wieland
