= Johann Jakob Moser =

German jurist, publicist and researcher

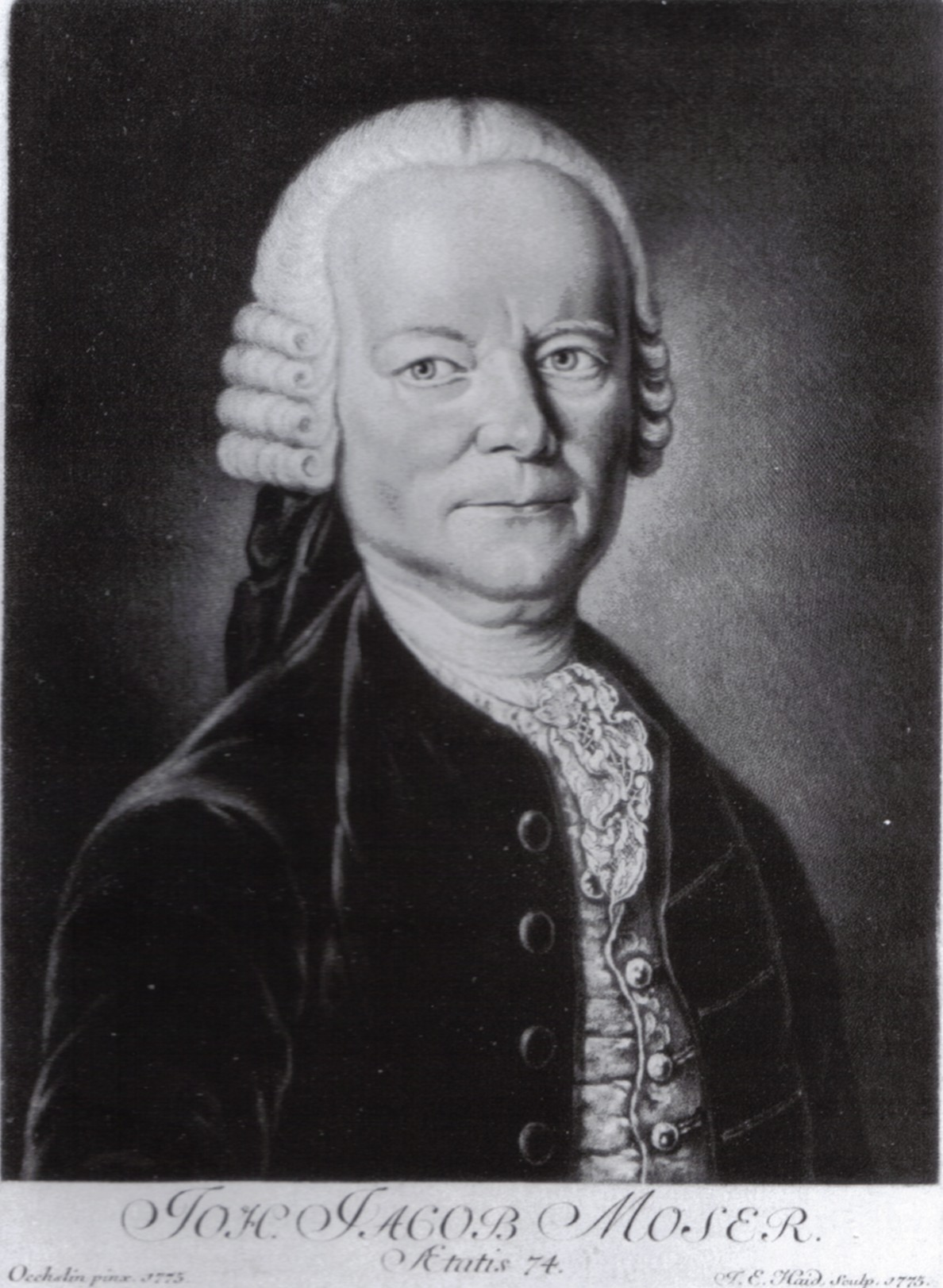
Johann Jacob Moser, after a painting by Johann Georg Oechslin (1775).

Johann Jakob Moser (18 January 1701 – 30 September 1785) was a German jurist, publicist and researcher, whose work earned him the title "The Father of German Constitutional Law" and whose political commitment to the principles of Liberalism caused him to lose academic positions and spend years as a political prisoner. Moser was born and died in Stuttgart.

== Early life ==
Johann Jacob Moser was a member of the Moser family of Filseck, an old and respectable Württemberg family. They were devout Protestants with a history of service as civil servants to the Duchy of Württemberg. Moser's father, Johann Jacob Moser of Filseck, was born in 1660 in Stuttgart and died in 1716; his mother, Helene Catharine Moser (née Misler), was born in 1672 in Stade and died in 1741 in Stuttgart.

Although the younger Moser had six siblings, his parents managed to fund his pursuit of an academic career.

== Career ==
After attending Eberhard-Ludwigs-Gymnasium, Moser studied state journalism at the University of Tübingen. His additional efforts at and success in independent learning enabled him to gain an appointment as professor of law at the same university at the early age of 18 or 19 years.

In 1721 Moser married Friederike Rosine Vischer, daughter of a Württembergian Upper Council President. Their oldest son, Friedrich Karl von Moser, was born on 18 December 1723 in Stuttgart, and became a jurist, political writer and a statesman.

From 1721 to 1726 he worked in Vienna. In 1724 he became an adviser to the state vice-chancellor Count Schönborn. Moser was not able to pursue a career in the imperial service, because he refused to convert to Catholicism. Soon afterwards he entered the civil service of the Holy Roman Empire, and was appointed as a "state adviser" in the Imperial Court. In 1726 Moser returned to Stuttgart as a government advisor. In 1727 he was appointed professor at the Tübingen Collegium. The work brought him into conflict with the government's censors, and he quit both his job as professor and his job as government advisor in 1732. He later held a long series of administrative appointments, giving him a thorough knowledge of political and constitutional issues.

In 1736 he was called to head the Faculty of Law at the University of Frankfurt (Oder), but had to leave after three years due to his thoroughly Liberal ideas which were disliked by King Frederick William I of Prussia. Between 1739 and 1751, he had various jobs.

He spent the years 1739 to 1747 at Ebersdorf, mainly concerned with completing the monumental 53 volumes of his Deutsches Staatsrecht ("German Constitutional Law"), a pioneering research analysing the named subject matter more systematically than ever done before, and based on a through study of the sources.

In 1751 Moser became a consultant on land reform to the Charles Eugene, Duke of Württemberg. He came into conflict with the Duke by opposing the Duke's absolutist tendencies. In July 1759 he was arrested and imprisoned without judicial procedure in solitary confinement in the fortress Hohentwiel, on the charge of authoring subversive writings. He completed his five-year detention with his mental and physical health and his faith in God unbroken. In order to meet his desire to write, without writing materials, he wrote religious songs on the walls with soot from the fireplace on the walls.

In 1764, aged 63, he was released, due in part to the intercession of Friedrich the Great of Prussia (son of the king who had hounded Moser in 1739). He was rehabilitated and restored to his position, rank and titles. He retired on 16 July 1770 aged 69. During the next 15 years, he wrote many books. Over his entire life he wrote 500-600 books. This prolific output led sometimes to careless representations of the facts in his works.

== Legacy ==
Statue of Johann Jakob Moser at the Reich Court building in Leipzig

Johann Jacob Moser wrote the first description of the German state based not on abstract principles but on concrete legal rules and judicial decisions. He collected material and organised it systematically. Thus he argued against the deductive systems of natural law advocated by Christian Thomasius (1655–1728) and Christian Wolff (1679–1754). He gave the same treatment to international law, describing how it was actually practiced, rather than attempting to derive it from nature. Moser is considered as laying the foundations for the modern German state and positive international law. He defended the traditional order by defending actual legal rules.

Apart from his work on state law, he was also interested in the local law of the numerous territories of the state. However, because of their great variety, he was not able to describe them with the same comprehensiveness.

Among his important later works can be mentioned Neues deutsches Staatsrecht, ("New German Constitutional Law"), published in 24 volumes between 1766 and 1782. His overall ouvre includes about 500 works, on law as well as theology.

== Bibliography (in German) ==
- H. Shultze, "Johann Jakob Moser – Der Vater der deutschen Staatsrechts", 1869
- J. Herzog, "Moser, Vater und Sohn", 1905
- M. Fröhlich, "Johann Jakob Moser in seinem Verhältnis zum Rationalismus und Pietismus", 1925.
- Nussbaum, Arthur (1947). A Concise History of the Law of Nations. New York: Macmillan. pp. 163–170.
