= Anton Schweitzer =

German composer (1735-1787)

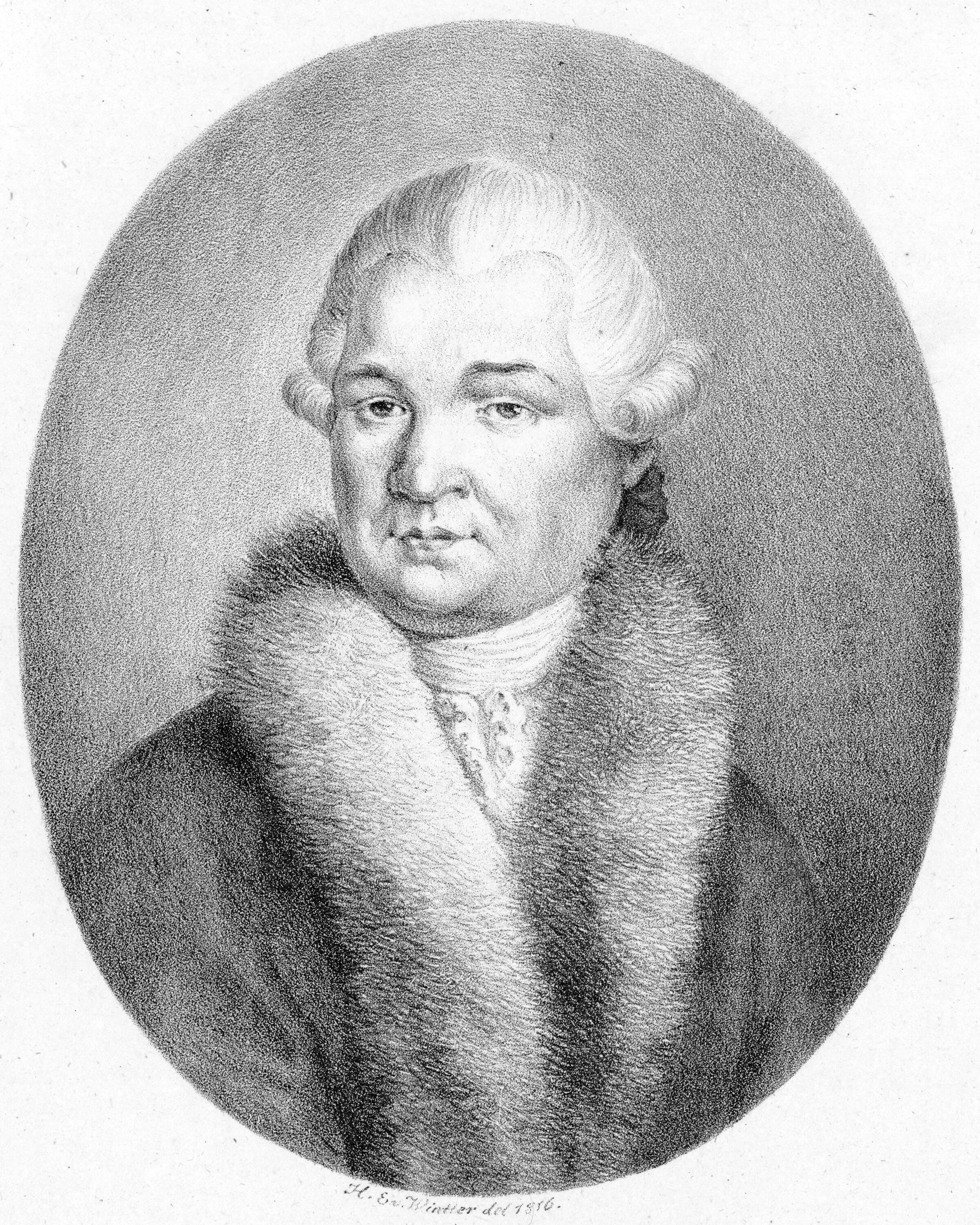
Anton Schweitzer by H. E. Winter

Anton Schweitzer (6 June 1735, Coburg – 23 November 1787, Gotha) was a German composer of operas, who was affiliated with Abel Seyler's theatrical company.

He was a child prodigy who obtained the patronage of the duke of Saxe-Hildburghausen, who sent him to study with Jakob Friedrich Kleinknecht at the court of Bayreuth in 1758, and then sent him to Italy (1764–66), and made him Kapellmeister. With the dismissal of the court orchestra at Hildburghausen, he was enabled to tour Europe with the Seyler theatrical company from 1769. His most notable work is the opera Alceste (1773), with a German libretto by Christoph Martin Wieland, among the early German-language operas.

== Operas ==
- Elysium (libretto: Johann Georg Jacobi, 18 January 1770, Hoftheater Hannover)
- Die Dorfgala (libretto: Friedrich Wilhelm Gotter, 30 June 1772, Hannover)
- Alceste (libretto: Christoph Martin Wieland, 28 May 1773, Hoftheater Weimar)
- Die Wahl des Herkules (libretto: Christoph Martin Wieland, 3 September 1773, Hoftheater Weimar)
- Rosamunde (libretto: Christoph Martin Wieland, 20 January 1780, Nationaltheater Mannheim)

== Sources ==
- Schweitzer, Anton – Neue Deutsche Biographie
- Jörg Krämer: Deutschsprachiges Musiktheater im späten 18. Jahrhundert. Typologie, Dramaturgie und Anthropologie einer populären Gattung. (= Studien zur deutschen Literatur vol. 149), Tübingen 1998, pp. 202–260.
- Julius Maurer: Anton Schweitzer als dramatischer Komponist. (= Publikationen der Internationalen Musikgesellschaft), Leipzig 1912.
- Hans Michael Schletterer (1891). "Schweizer, Anton" . Allgemeine Deutsche Biographie (in German). Vol. 33. Leipzig: Duncker & Humblot. pp. 371–373.
