= Charlotte Sporleder =

German composer

Charlotte Wilhelmine Eringarde Freiin Spiegel von und zu Peckelsheim Sporleder (November 8, 1836 – January 9, 1915) was a German composer who won a medal at the 1893 Chicago World's Fair. She published her music under the name Charlotte Sporleder.

Sporleder was born in Kassel to Josepha von Warnsdorf and General Spiegel von und zu Peckelsheim. She married Lt Col Justus Henrich Sporleder, who was 29 years her senior, in 1855 and was widowed in 1865.

Sporleder started piano lessons with her mother when she was six years old. She later studied music with Otto Kraushaar and Friedrich Ruhl. She began publishing music in the late 1860s, producing at least 19 opus numbers. In 1877, Sporleder donated the proceeds from the sale of Rondo Capriccio towards building a monument honoring Louis Spohr in Kassel. In 1893, she joined musicologist Anna Morsch to present a program of German music at the Chicago World Fair. She was awarded a medal from the World Fair and a special diploma from the Chicago Women's Committee because she "contributed significantly to the success of the exhibition by sending in her beautiful and numerous compositions."

Sporleder's music was published by A. Michaelis, Bote & Bock, Johann Andre, and Monopol Verlag. Her compositions include:

== Band ==
- some military band music

== Chamber ==
- Concertante (violin and piano)

== Piano ==
- Grand Sonata
- Idylle for the Left Hand, opus 19
- Impromptu, opus 8
- Prussian Victory March, opus 14
- Rondo Capriccioso, opus 16 (also arranged for four hand piano)
- Valse Brillante

== Vocal ==
- “Dear, Hear Me, opus 6” (voice, violin and piano)
- “Der Vater ist am Steuer, opus 1”
- Four Songs, opus 2 (text by Heinrich Heine)
- Four Songs, opus 15
- Two Songs, opus 11 (text by Heinrich Heine)
- Weihnachtslied (Christmas Carol), opus 20

- Listen to Ich hab im Traum geweinet by Charlotte Sporleder
