= Ludwig Hoffmann =

Ludwig Hoffmann or Hofmann may refer to:

- Ludwig Hoffmann (Pilot and design engineer) (1912–1979), German test and glider pilot and design engineer
- Ludwig Hoffmann (architect) (1852–1932), German architect
- Ludwig Hoffmann (Waffen-SS) (1908–1945), Hauptsturmführer (Captain) in the Waffen-SS
- Ludwig Hofmann (footballer) (1900–1935), German footballer
- Ludwig Hofmann (bass) (1895–1963), German opera singer
- Leopold Hofmann, also Ludwig Hoffman, Austrian composer of classical music

== See also ==
- Ludwig Hoffmann-Rumerstein (1937–2022), Grand Commander of the Sovereign Military Order of Malta 2014–2019
