= Johann Rudolph Schellenberg =

Swiss artist, writer and entomologist (1740–1806)

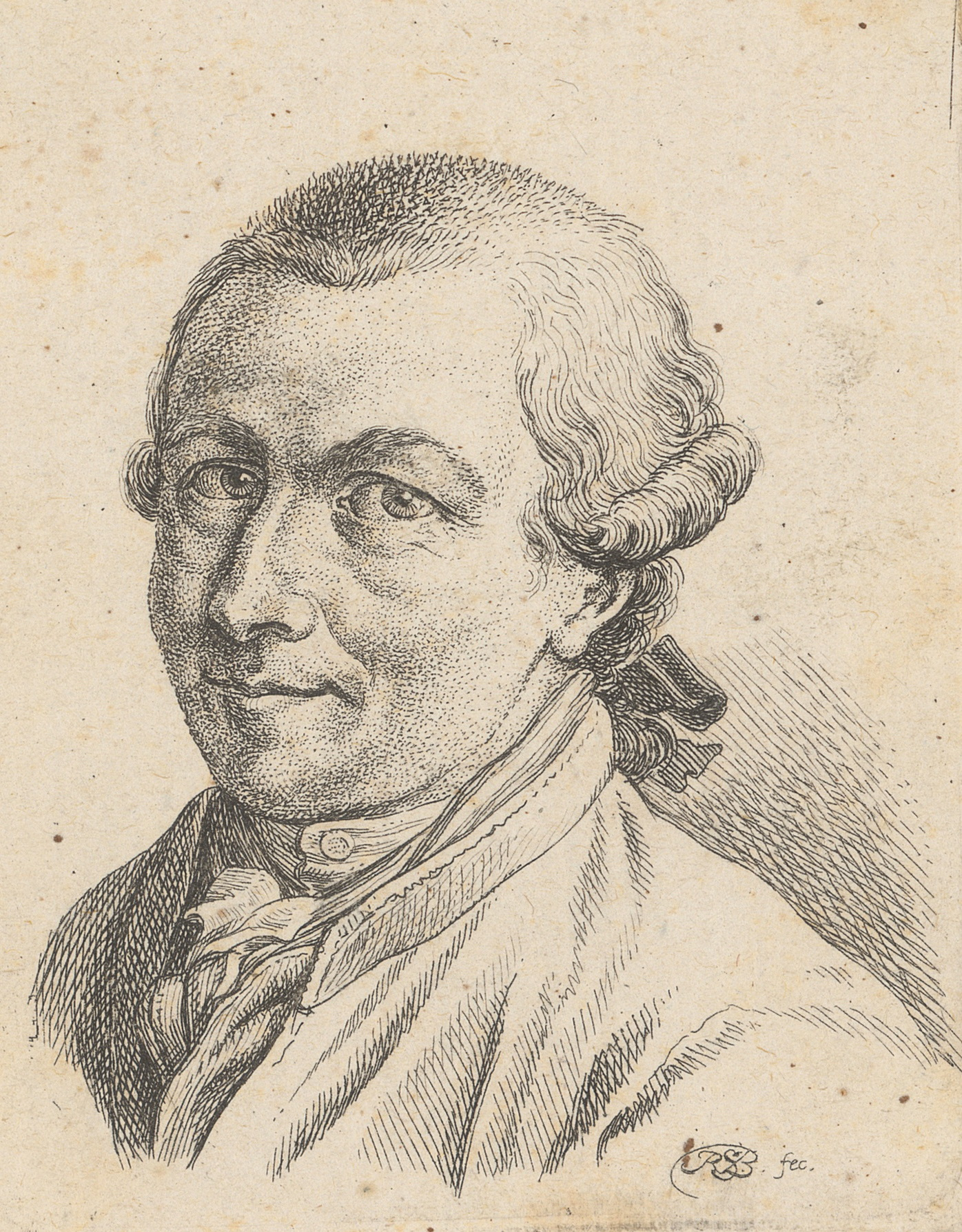
Johann Rudolph Schellenberg: Self-portrait (etching, c. 1780)

Johann Rudolph Schellenberg (4 January 1740, Basel – 8 June 1806, Töss, a district in the city of Winterthur) was a Swiss artist, writer and entomologist best known for his illustrations of insects.

During his career he performed illustrative work for Johann Heinrich Sulzer, Johannes Gessner, Johann Kaspar Lavater and Johann Kaspar Füssli. He illustrated a number of entomological works, a few being:

- Johann Heinrich Sulzer's Die Kennzeichen der Insekten, nach Anleitung des Königl. Schwed. Ritters und Leibarzts Karl Linnaeus. Mit einer Vorrede des Herrn Johannes Gessners, published in Zurich in 1761.
- Johann Jacob Roemer's Genera Insectorum Linnaei et Fabricii iconibus illustrata published in Winterthur, Steiner in 1789.
- His own Genres des mouches Diptères représentés en XLII planches projettées et dessinées et expliquées par deux amateurs de l'entomologie, published in Zurich in 1803. This work has 42 plates.

The municipal library in Winterthur has about 4000 of his insect watercolors.
