= History of the Abderites =

1780 novel by Christoph Martin Wieland

- Author: Christoph Martin Wieland
- Original title: Die Geschichte der Abderiten
- Language: German
- Genre: satire
- Publisher: Weidmann & Reich
- Publication date: 1780
- Publication place: Saxony
- Pages: 767

History of the Abderites (German: Die Geschichte der Abderiten. Eine sehr wahrscheinliche Geschichte, lit. 'The Story of the Abderites: A Very Probable Story') is a novel by the German writer Christoph Martin Wieland. It satirises the pettiness of the inhabitants of small-town Germany, using the ancient Greek town of Abdera as a stand-in for the contemporary German towns which Wieland was critiquing. Abderit is a name for a 'Schildbürger', a naive and simple but also conceited person. The term likely targeted the often hypocritical citizens of Wieland's home town of Biberach.

Written between 1773 and 1779, History of the Abderites was published in part in the periodical Der teutsche Merkur (The German Mercury) in 1774 and was first issued as a collection in book form in 1780.

== Background ==
Christoph Martin Wieland intended the book to serve as a satire of the parochial and self-satisfied nature of provincial German life, using Abdera as the setting. The town was notorious in ancient times for the small-mindedness of its inhabitants, with the notable exception of Democritus. It was ridiculed by Cicero and described as a "republic of fools"; it became a symbol of folly to the ancient Greeks, where things happened in the opposite way to how they would normally be expected. Wieland sought not only to satirise the petty-minded and Philistine nature of the small-town German bourgeoisie but to attack the excessive enthusiasm for Classical ideals that he perceived at the time. Ironically, he had himself previously worked to promote Classical ideals but now felt that the populace had become too earnest and uncritical in adopting them.

== Synopsis ==
The book is set in the ancient Greek town of Abdera in Thrace and is divided into five chapters, each depicting a different aspect of the Abderites' foolishness. In the first, Demokritus unter der Abderiten, the philosopher Democritus returns to his hometown but finds that the inhabitants doubt his sanity. The second chapter, Hippocrates in Abdera, portrays the physician Hippocrates evaluating Democritus and finding him sane, but the townspeople are mad. Euripides in Abdera, the third chapter, is principally a literary satire that reflects the contemporary German enthusiasm for the theatre, while the fourth chapter, Der Prozeß um des Esels Schatten, depicts a legal battle between an ass driver and the animal's hirer, highlighting the extreme litigiousness of the Abderites. In the final part, Die Frösche der Latona, divisions between rival sects of frog-worshippers mean that the Abderites fail to take action against the town's sacred frogs and consequently find themselves being driven out of their homes. At the end of the book, Wieland makes his satirical intent clear with the statement that although Abdera had long since disappeared, the Abderites still exist and are to be found in every town and city in Germany.
