= Otto Kraushaar (musician) =

German musician, writer and composer

Otto Kraushaar (31 May 1812 - 23 November 1866) was a German musician, writer and composer.

== Life ==
Kraushaar was from Kassel, Germany. He was a musician, composer, and writer. He studied with Moritz Hauptmann, in 1834 he published his first composition in the Berlin publishing house, but in the future paid little attention to composing music, leaving only a few songs. At the time of Hauptmann's departure for Leipzig in 1842 he acquired the reputation of one of the city's leading musical educators (he studied Christopher Bach and Karl Bargheer in particular), and was actively published as a music journalist in various German editions. He was one of the founders of the Kassel singing academy, in 1853–1856. One of his students was composer Charlotte Sporleder. Lraisjaar performed with regular public lectures on music. The last 20 years of his life he worked on a major theoretical work, from which, however, was published only a small excerpt (Deutsches der Accordische Gegensatz und Die Begründung der Scala, 1852), while the fundamental Schule der Tonbildung and Grundlehren der musikalischen Komposition remained in the manuscripts that are kept in the archives of the musical manuscripts of the Land Library in Kassel.
