= Johann Jacob Roemer =

Swiss botanist (1763–1819)

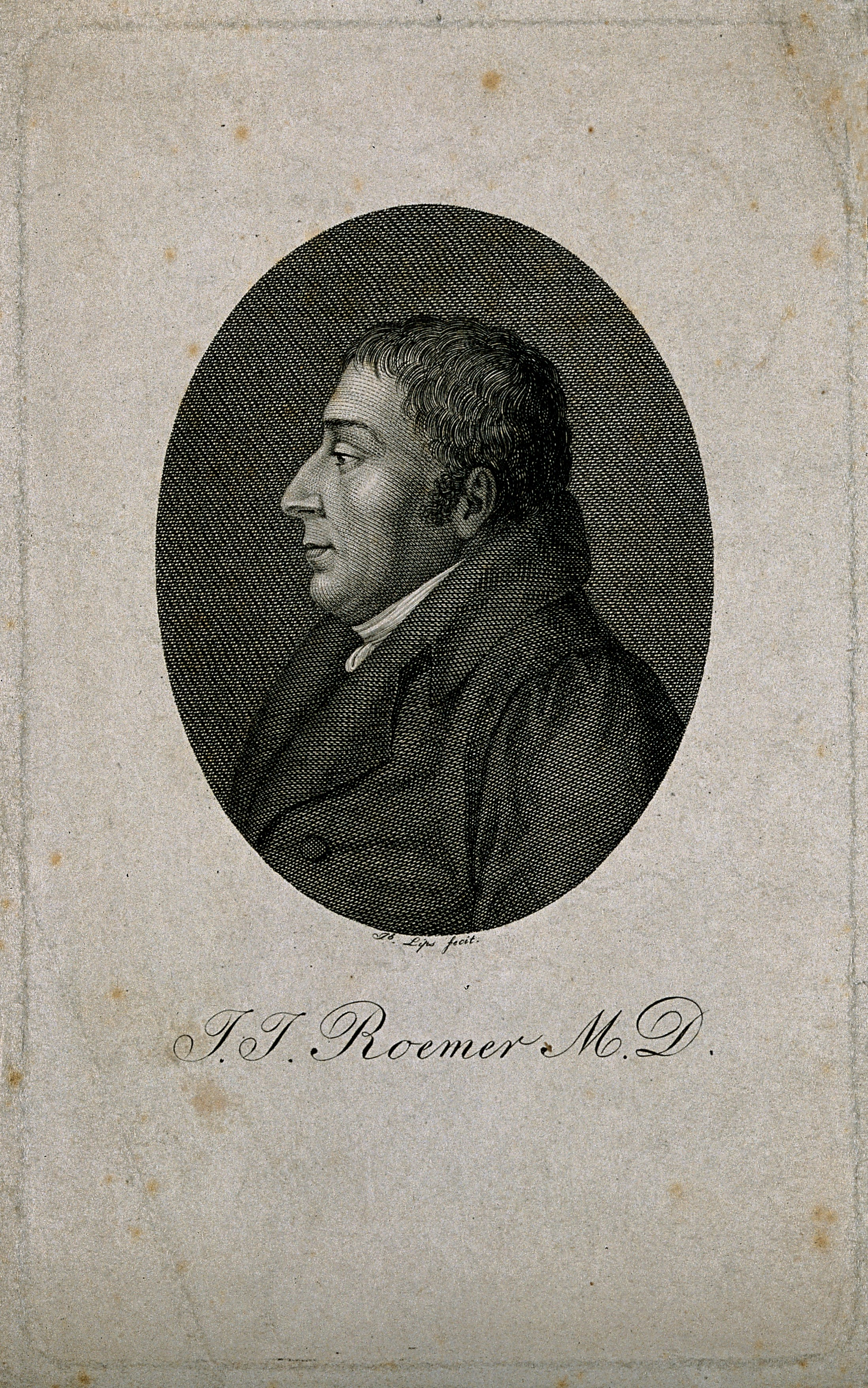
Johann Jacob Roemer. Portrait by Johann Heinrich Lips

Johann Jacob Roemer (8 January 1763, Zürich – 15 January 1819) was a Swiss physician and professor of botany in Zürich, Switzerland. He was also an entomologist.

With Austrian botanist Joseph August Schultes, he published the 16th edition of Carl Linnaeus' Systema Vegetabilium.

Roemer's Genera insectorum is a Swiss publication on entomology. The hand-coloured plates were drawn and engraved by the Swiss artist J.R. Schellenberg, an entomologist himself and therefore familiar with structural details.

In 1793, he was elected a foreign member of the Royal Swedish Academy of Sciences. The botanical genus Roemeria from the family Papaveraceae is named after him.

== Works ==
- Magazin für die Botanik, vols. 1–4; 1787–1791, with publicist Paul Usteri (1768-1831). Afterwards Roemer continued this series as Neues Magazin für die Botanik.
- Genera insectorum Linnaei et Fabricii iconibus illustrata. Vitoduri Helvetorum (Winterthur), apud Henric. Steiner, 1789
- Flora Europaea... Norimbergae [Nürnberg] 14 fasc. 1797-1811
- Collecteana ad Omnem rem Botanicam Spectantia Partim e Propriis, Partim ex Amicorum Schedis Manuscriptis Concinnavit et Edidit J. J. Roemer, M.D. Turici [Zurich], In parts between 1806 and 1810.
- Systema vegetabilium (ed. 16) 7 vols. – 1817–1830
