= Sarastro =

Sarastro is an alternative name of Zoroaster and may refer to characters in:

- The Magic Flute
- Queen of the Night aria
