= Works inspired by The Magic Flute =

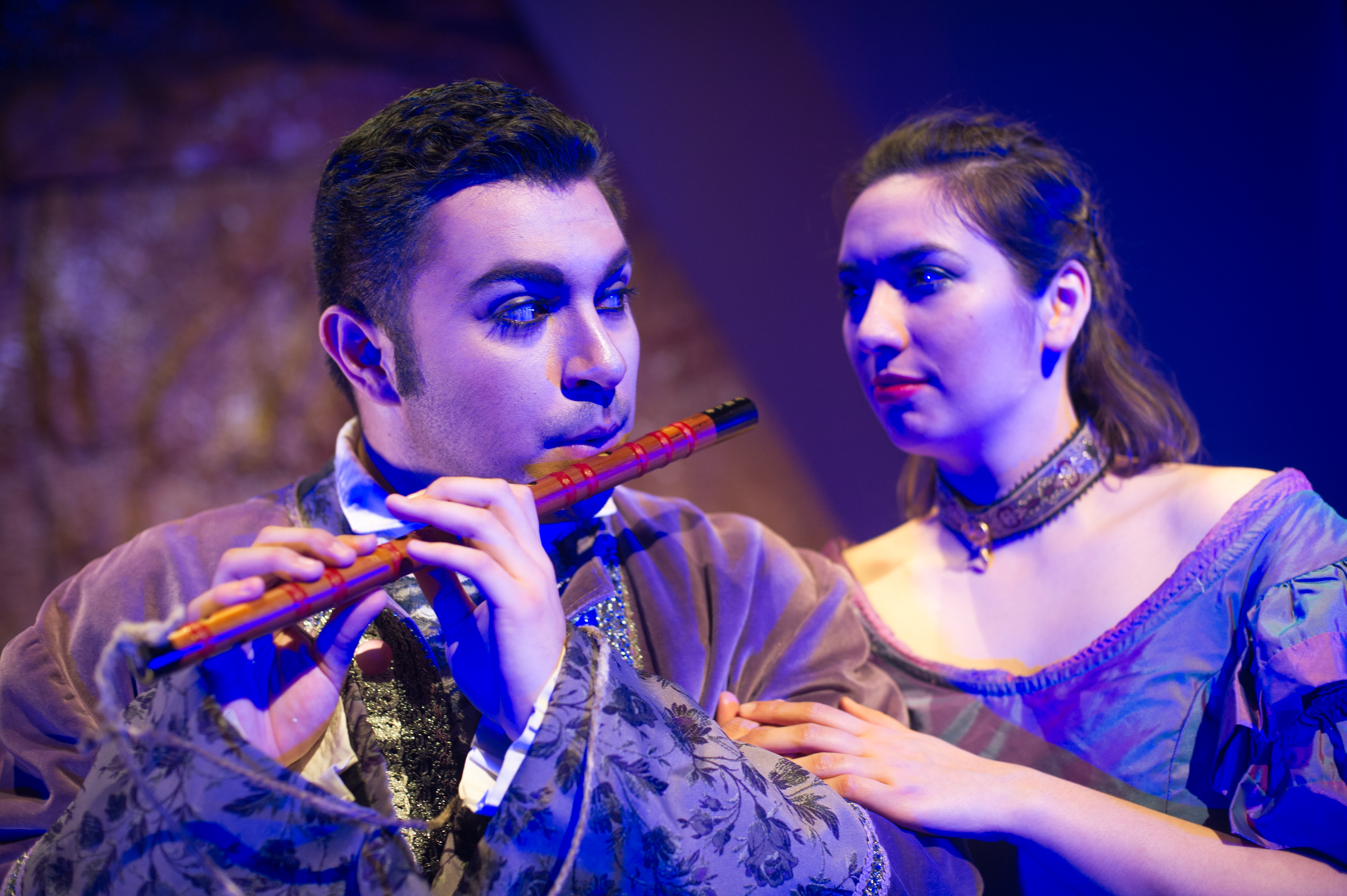
A production of The Magic Flute at Texas A&M University–Commerce in 2015

The Magic Flute, an opera by Wolfgang Amadeus Mozart with libretto by Emanuel Schikaneder, was composed in 1791 and premiered to great success. It has been an important part of the operatic repertory ever since, and has inspired a great number of sequels, adaptations, novels, films, artwork, and musical compositions.

== Sequels in literature and theatre ==
There are two sequels named The Magic Flute Part Two. The first is a fragment by Johann Wolfgang von Goethe, which was intended to be set to music by Paul Wranitzky. The second was sponsored by Emanuel Schikaneder himself, the opera, Das Labyrinth oder Der Kampf mit den Elementen (The Labyrinth or The Struggle with the Elements), a Singspiel in two acts composed in 1798 by Peter von Winter to a German libretto by Schikaneder.

== Adaptations of Mozart's music by other composers ==
- "Away with Melancholy" was a popular duet first published in London in the early 1790s, and reprinted in America from 1797 on. The music is adapted from the episode in the act 1 finale in which Monostatos and his slaves, enchanted by the music from Papageno's magic bells, dance off the stage, leaving Papageno and Pamina in freedom.
- Beethoven wrote sets of variations for violoncello and piano for two numbers from the opera. His twelve variations in F major on "Ein Mädchen oder Weibchen" (1796) is catalogued as Op. 66 and his seven variations in E-flat major on "Bei Männern" (1801) is catalogued as WoO 46.
- Les Mystères d'Isis, French adaptation of the opera by Ludwig Wenzel Lachnith, represented for the first time in Paris in 1801. Production run for 130 subsequent performances till 1827.
- Christian Gottlob Neefe, one of Beethoven's teachers, wrote a set of piano variations on the March of the Priests, and also arranged five others extracts from the opera for piano 4-hands.
- Johann Nepomuk Hummel arranged the overture for piano.
- Daniel Steibelt wrote piano variations on "Bei Männern".
- Josepha Barbara Auernhammer, a former student of Mozart, wrote a set of variations for piano on Papageno's aria "Der Vogelfänger bin ich ja".
- Johann Baptist Cramer wrote a set of piano variations on Papageno's aria Ein Mädchen oder Weibchen wünscht Papageno sich.
- Mikhail Glinka wrote a set of piano variations on the glockenspiel theme from the finale to act 1 ("Das klinget so herrlich, das klinget so schön").
- Guitarist and composer Fernando Sor transcribed "Six Airs from The Magic Flute", Op. 19, for solo guitar around 1820–1821 and wrote his Introduction and Variations on a Theme by Mozart, Op. 9, on the music from act 1 sung by Monostatos and the slaves, or as Sor called it, "O cara armonia".
- Like Sor, Athénaïs Paulian wrote variations for guitar on the very same theme.
- The Canadian national anthem, "O Canada", by Calixa Lavallée (1880) has been noticed for its resemblance to the "March of the Priests" that begins the second act.
- Flautists Jean-Pierre Rampal and Claudi Arimany have recorded duet arrangements from the opera made by Gerhard Braun.
- Spanish composer Pablo de Sarasate wrote a violin showpiece, "Fantasy on Die Zeuberflöte", Op. 54 (1908).
- British composer Jonathan Dove wrote a flute concerto The Magic Flute Dances.
- Composer Robert Fobbes wrote "Fantasy on Mozart's Die Zauberflöte" (The Magic Flute), for flute and orchestra.
- American composer Jasper Gilley wrote a solo piano showpiece, "Reminiscences on Die Zauberflöte", which was partially inspired by Franz Liszt's Réminiscences de Don Juan.
- The Children of Bodom song "Hatebreeder" (1999) features a short solo referencing "Der Hölle Rache kocht in meinem Herzen".
- Chicago theatre director and playwright Mary Zimmerman adapted the libretto of Mozart’s The Magic Flute into English and staged a premiere of The Matchbox Magic Flute, which she described as “a hybrid, a playful variation, more a creature of the theatre [than of] opera," at the Goodman Theatre in February–March 2024.

== Art ==
- In 1986, the Metropolitan Opera of New York commissioned a poster from Graciela Rodo Boulanger for The Magic Flute.
- Eduardo Paolozzi created a screenprint illustrating the arrival of the Queen of the Night in act 2, Magic Flute II in 1994.
- In 2018, publisher EVIL TENDER debuted its Opera Print Series with a limited edition screenprint for The Magic Flute by illustrator Jonathan Burton.
- Inspired by Mozart and Schikaneder's opera, Anastasia Elena Baranoff, award-winning American fine artist and founder of Egg Tempera Movement, created the original egg tempera painting "The Magic Flute - On The Wings Of Imagination".

== Films ==
- Papageno (1935), a silhouette animation short film by Lotte Reiniger, loosely based on The Magic Flute
- La Flûte magique (1946), a short animated film directed by Paul Grimault.
- Trollflöjten (The Magic Flute) (1975), a filmed production of the opera, sung in Swedish and directed by Ingmar Bergman
- The Magic Flute (1994), an animated television film produced by Ruby-Spears Productions, DIC Entertainment and Greengrass Productions, which aired as part of the ABC Weekend Specials series.
- The Magic Flute (1995), a traditional animation film directed by Valeriy Ugarov for the series Operavox, set to a half-hour, English-language version
- The Magic Flute (2006), the opera sung in English and set against a background inspired by World War I, directed by Kenneth Branagh, screenplay by Stephen Fry
- Magic Flute Diaries (2008), a modern story about singers in a production of The Magic Flute whose lives loosely parallel those of the opera's main characters. The film also includes excerpts from the opera itself performed by Opera Atelier.
- "Masonic Mysteries", an episode of the British TV series Inspector Morse, which uses the opera as its central theme.
- The Magic Flute (2022), a German produced musical film featuring a contemporary framing device with the opera taking place in a parallel fantasy world.

== Books ==
- Dickinson, G. Lowes's The Magic Flute: A Poetic Fantasy, 1920, reinterprets the story as a parable of civilization after World War I.
- Updike, John, The Magic Flute, a children's book based on the opera with illustrations by Warren Chappell. A. A. Knopf, 1962.
- Ibbotson, Eva, Magic Flutes (1982), a teen romance period novel, centred around the Viennese opera, and the main performance of The Magic Flute
- Bradley, Marion Zimmer, Night's Daughter, a novel based on The Magic Flute, 1985. It sets the story in an Atlantis-like world with human-animal hybrid creatures. Bradley agrees with Bergman that Sarastro is Pamina's father.
- Russell, P. Craig's The Magic Flute, a graphic novel published in 1990 as part of the author's Library of Operatic Adaptation.
- Trapido, Barbara, Temples of Delight (1990). A novel which, though set in contemporary England, takes its structure very loosely from The Magic Flute. Characters in the novel are analogous to Pamina, Tamino, Papageno and Sarastro although the novel strays heavily from the original plot with the 'Pamina' character ultimately rejecting 'Tamino' in favour of a romantic relationship with 'Sarastro'.
- Dokey, Cameron, Sunlight and Shadow, (part of the Once Upon A Time series), 2004, a retelling of The Magic Flute for teen readers; Dokey's novel also states that Sarastro is Pamina's father.
- Amano, Yoshitaka, Mateki: The Magic Flute (2008), an adaptation of the opera illustrated by himself and retold using classic Japanese elements.
- Luisa Perkins's contemporary fantasy novel Summersong (2021) is a retelling of The Magic Flute set in modern-day New York among a reclusive people called the Volant.

== Plays ==
- Thomas Bernhard's 1972 play, Der Ignorant und der Wahnsinnige (The Ignoramus and the Madman), takes place before, during and after a performance of the opera, at which the prima donna decides to make this, her 222nd performance of the Queen of the Night, her last.

== Adaptations ==
- Susan Hammonnd and publisher The Children's Group (now part of Linus Entertainment) published an arrangement called Classical Kids: Mozart's Magic Fantasy. The story adds a new protagonist - the daughter of the actress playing the Queen of the Night - who brings the flute with her onto the stage and gets stuck in the story. The album received the 1991 Juno Award for Children's Album of the Year.
- In 1995, the pianist Joanna MacGregor made an arrangement of the opera aimed at children aged 7 and above, premiered at the Unicorn Theatre in London. The action was condensed, the orchestral score was rearranged for a chamber music including piano, and the plot updated; Tamino is a journalist (aided by the three boys), Sarastro a millionaire environmentalist, the Queen of the Night a failed rock-star formerly married to Sarastro (Pamina is their daughter), and Papageno the Queen's former roadie. The production has been frequently restaged, including at the Bath International Music Festival in 2012.
- Pamina Devi is a 2006 dance adaptation of The Magic Flute by Sophiline Cheam Shapiro, originally directed by Peter Sellars, in the style of Cambodian classical dance. It is not entirely based on the same plot and includes elements foreign to the original.
- The Magic Flute (Impempe Yomlingo) is a 2007 adaptation of the opera as musical theatre. Set in contemporary South Africa, the musical re-interprets the story from a South African perspective. Mozart's score is transposed for an orchestra of marimbas, drums and township percussion.

== Psychology ==
The Papageno effect is the effect that mass media can have by presenting non-suicide alternatives to crises. The character Papageno was contemplating suicide until other characters showed him a different way to resolve his problems.
