= Eight Variations on "Ein Weib ist das herrlichste Ding" =

1791 piano composition by W. A. Mozart

Eight Variations in F major on "Ein Weib ist das herrlichste Ding"
- Theme and variations by Wolfgang Amadeus Mozart
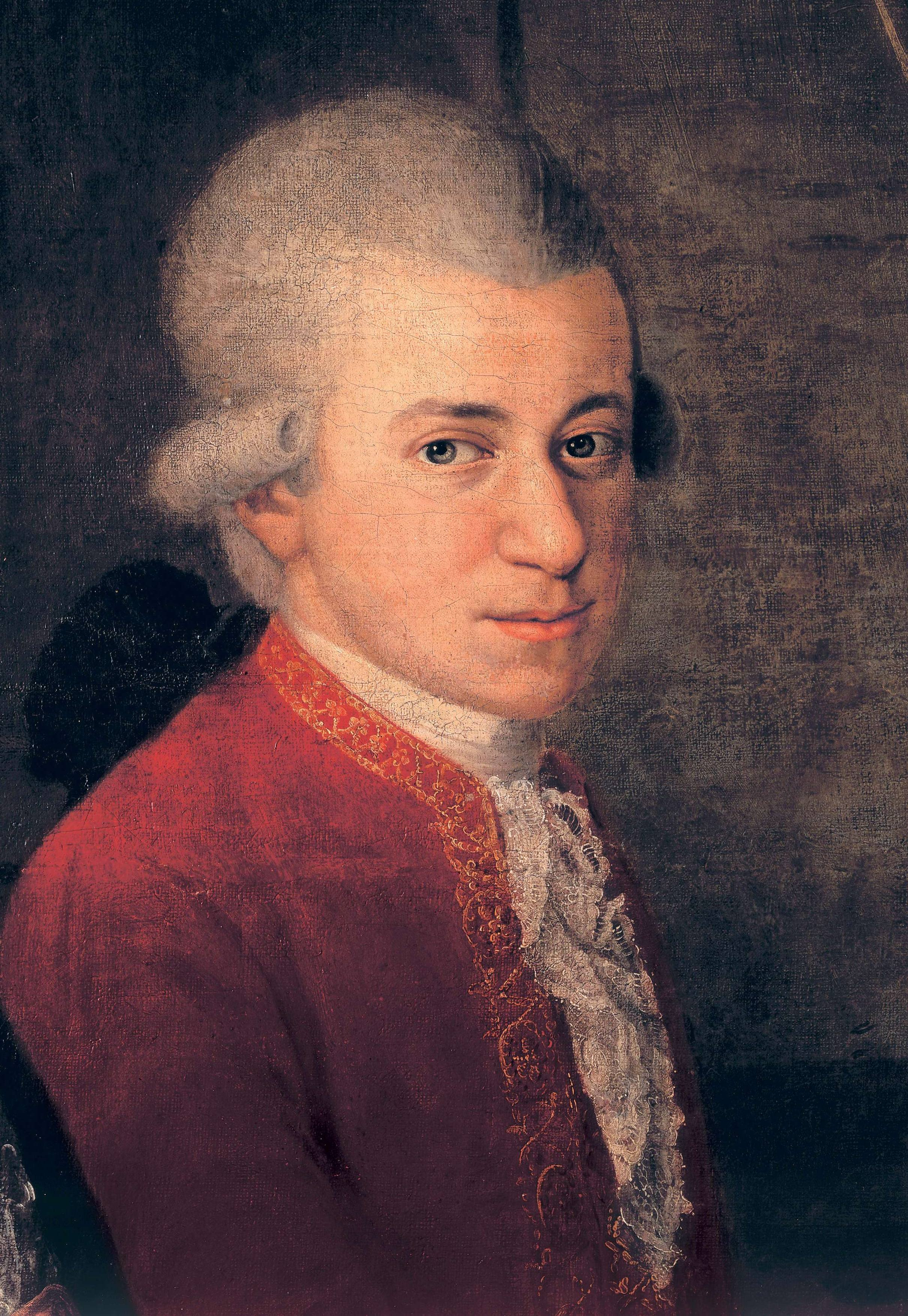
- Mozart around 1780
- Native name: Acht Variationen über "Ein Weib ist das herrlichste Ding"
- Key: F major
- Catalogue: K. 613
- Period: Classical music
- Form: Theme and variations
- Composed: 1791
- Published: 1791
- Duration: 13 minutes
- Movements: 1
- Scoring: Piano

Eight Variations in F major on "Ein Weib ist das herrlichste Ding", K. 613, is a set of theme and variations for piano by composer Wolfgang Amadeus Mozart. Composed in 1791, it is the last set of theme and variations for piano ever composed by Mozart.

== Background ==
Mozart's Eight Variations were composed between March 8 and April 12, 1791, during the final year of his life. The theme originated from a popular theatrical song featured in a musical play written by Emanuel Schikaneder, the librettist of The Magic Flute and a prominent actor-manager of his time. The music for the play was composed by Benedikt Schack and Franz Xaver Gerl, both members of Schikaneder's theatrical troupe. Schack would later premiere as Tamino in The Magic Flute, while Gerl created the role of Sarastro. The play in question was part of a series of comic Singspiel centered on the character der dumme Anton (the stupid Anton), a figure in the tradition of Viennese farce and the Hanswurst character Der dumme Gärtner (The Stupid Gardener), believed to be the first joint effort by Schack and Gerl for Schikaneder's company and a sequel to the original Anton play, premiered at the Freihaus-Theater auf der Wieden in Vienna on 12 July 1789.

This was Mozart's last published variation set. As variations were very popular amongst performers and publishers, Mozart published more than a dozen of them during his lifetime. The piece was published by Artaria, in Vienna, before June 1791. The publication was announced in the Wiener Zeitung on 4 June of that year and, even though the publication mentioned twelve variations, only eight of them are known to exist. Several manuscript copies have survived by various scribes, some of them reflecting different and unique variants and numbering, possibly reflecting different transmission lines.

== Structure ==
The Eight Variations have a total duration of around 13 minutes. It consists of the theme, eight variations and a short coda which is not separated from the final variation by a double bar. It is mostly in F major; the minore variation (No. VI) is in F minor. Both the theme and every individual variation has an introduction before presenting the theme, which is varied yet independent from the variation itself in terms of key, tempo and time signature. The segment list is as follows:

Structure
Variation	Title or tempo marking	Time signature	Bars
Theme	—	3/4	44
Variation I	—	3/4	48
Variation II	—	3/4	47
Variation III	—	3/4	47
Variation IV	—	3/4	47
Variation V	—	3/4	48
Variation VI	Minore	3/4	46
Variation VII	Adagio	3/4	45
Variation VIII	Allegro	2/4	90
Coda	—	3/4	41
