= O Isis und Osiris =

Aria from Mozart's 1791 opera The Magic Flute

O Isis und Osiris
Josef Greindl, RIAS Symphony Orchestra, RIAS Kammerchor, Ferenc Fricsay (1953)

"O Isis und Osiris" (lit. 'O Isis and Osiris') is an aria with chorus from Wolfgang Amadeus Mozart's 1791 opera The Magic Flute. The aria, in F major and 3/4 time, takes place in act 2, scene 1. It is the first aria sung by Sarastro, ruler of the Kingdom of Light, a bass, and his priests.

== Synopsis ==
Sarastro and his priests celebrate the successes of the Prince Tamino as he passes through a series of trials to test and purify him. They pray he will succeed and become worthy of joining their order.

== The text ==
Mozart's friend Emanuel Schikaneder, who played Tamino's companion Papageno in the premiere performance, wrote the opera's German libretto.

Sarastro:	O Isis und Osiris, schenket der Weisheir Geist dem neuen Paar! Die Ihr der Wand'rer Schritte lenket, stärkt mit Geduld sie in Gefahr.	O Isis and Osiris, grant the spirit of wisdom to the new couple! You who guide the wanderer's steps, strengthen them with patience in times of danger.
Priests:	Stärkt mit Geduld sie in Gefahr.	Strengthen them with patience in times of danger.
Sarastro:	Lasst sie der Prüfung Früchte sehen, doch sollten sie zu Grabe gehen, so lohnt der Tugend kühnen Lauf, nehmt sie in euren Wohnsitz auf!	Let them see the fruits of their trials, yet should they pass into the grave, may their bold pursuit be rewarded, welcome them into your abode!
Priests:	Nehmt sie in euren Wohnsitz auf!	Welcome them into your abode!
