= Johann Joseph Nouseul =

German singer

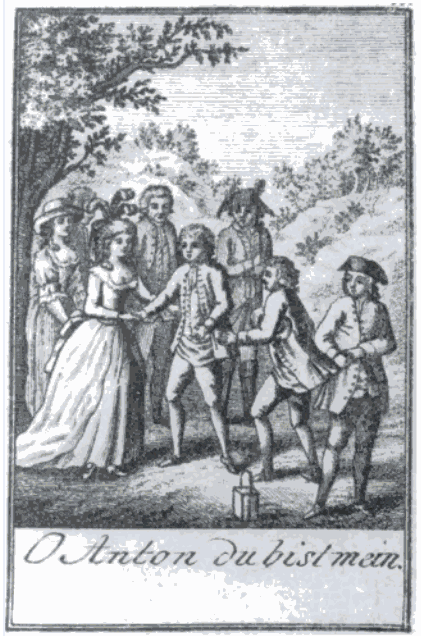
Johann Joseph Nouseul in performance with the Schikaneder troupe: the number "O Anton du bist mein" from the Singspiel Die Zween Anton. The couple holding hands are the tenor Benedikt Schack (later the first Tamino) and soprano Josepha Hofer (the first Queen of the Night); Nouseul, playing the role of Graf von Dorn, stands behind them. Click on image for the identities of the other players and the original source.

Johann Joseph Nouseul (1742 – 9 December 1821) was an actor, singer, and theater manager who worked in Vienna and other German-speaking cities in the late 18th and early 19th centuries. He is remembered for having premiered the role of Monostatos in Wolfgang Amadeus Mozart's opera The Magic Flute.

== Career ==
Nothing is known of his youth or his early efforts in the field of acting. In 1770, he married Maria Rosalia Lefèvre, an actress who went on to a distinguished career. During the 1770s he acted with his wife in companies in Munich, Rastatt, and briefly ran his own company in Hanover. He came to Vienna in 1779 and made his debut 17 January 1780 in the resident company of the Burgtheater. He left the company in 1781 (his wife remained), and during 1782 was co-director with Friedrich Gensicke of the Kärntnertortheater. At the time he also played roles in French with the visiting French troupe performing at the Kärntnertortheater. The following year he left Vienna to serve as the director of the theater in Graz.

By 1789 he had returned to Vienna, where he was part of the company run by Johann Friedel in the Theater auf der Wieden. That year, Friedel died and a new company was formed at the theater by Emanuel Schikaneder. Nouseul was among the performers from Friedel's company that Schikaneder retained. The illustration shows Nouseul in performance as part of the Wiedner ensemble in Die zween Anton, a popular work that introduced the new company to Vienna. The Magic Flute premiered 30 September 1791, with Nouseul in role of Monostatos, the villainous assistant of Sarastro who ultimately defects to the side of the Queen of the Night.

Nouseul continued to perform in Schikaneder's troupe until 1800, at which point he joined the Burgtheater again, continuing there to 1814. He died in 1821 in Vienna.

== Sources ==
- Clive, H. Peter (1993) Mozart and his Circle: A Biographical Dictionary. New Haven: Yale University Press.
- E. Marktl: "Nouseul (Nouseuil, Nousseul), Johann (Josef)". In: Österreichisches Biographisches Lexikon 1815–1950 (ÖBL). Vol. 7, Austrian Academy of Sciences, Vienna 1978, ISBN 3-7001-0187-2, p. 159.
