= Franz Xaver Gerl =

Austrian opera singer and composer (1764–1827)

Franz Xaver Gerl (30 November 1764 – 9 March 1827) was a bass singer and composer of the classical era. He sang the role of Sarastro in the premiere of Mozart's opera The Magic Flute.

== Life ==
Gerl was born on 30 November 1764 in Andorf (then Bavaria, since 1780 part of Austria). He sang as a chorister as a child in Salzburg; the New Grove asserts that he was probably the pupil of Leopold Mozart. He attended the University of Salzburg, studying logic and physics. His career as a bass began in 1785 with the theatrical company of Ludwig Schmidt.

He evidently had an impressively low vocal range; Peter Branscombe observes that the very low notes that Mozart included in the part of Sarastro have been "the despair of many a bass singer since".

By 1787 he had joined the theatrical company of Emanuel Schikaneder, for which he sang the demanding role of Osmin in Mozart's opera Die Entführung aus dem Serail and other roles. In 1789 the troupe settled at the Theater auf der Wieden in Vienna. Gerl participated in a system of joint composition used by Schikaneder's troupe, in which Singspiele were produced rapidly by having several composers collaborate. As such, Gerl may have been the composer of the aria "Ein Weib ist das herrlichste Ding", for which Mozart wrote a set of eight variations for piano, K. 613 (the composer may instead have been another singer-composer in the troupe, Benedikt Schack).

Mozart gradually came to participate more in the activities of the Schikaneder troupe, culminating in his opera The Magic Flute (1791) to a libretto by Schikaneder. Gerl premiered the role of Sarastro, and continued to sing this part in many performances through 1792. He left Schikaneder's troupe in 1793.

Gerl may have been a participant in a rehearsal of Mozart's Requiem on the day before the composer died; for details see Benedikt Schack.

Gerl's later career took him to Brno and Mannheim, where he retired in 1826. He died there on 9 March 1827.

== Assessment ==
Branscombe, writing in the New Grove, offers the following concerning Gerl's reputation as a singer: "When Schröder, the greatest actor-manager of his age, went to Vienna in 1791 he was told not to miss hearing [Benedikt] Schack and Gerl at Schikaneder's theatre." Branscombe also notes the striking quality of the music that Mozart wrote for Gerl.

== Family ==
Gerl married the soprano Barbara Reisinger (1770–1806) on 2 September 1789. She also sang in the Schikaneder troupe, and performed the role of Papagena at the Magic Flute premiere. She went with Gerl to Brno and Mannheim, and died there shortly after giving birth to their second child.

== Notes ==
=== Sources ===
- Branscombe, Peter (1991). W. A. Mozart: Die Zauberflöte. Cambridge Opera Handbooks. Cambridge: Cambridge University Press. ISBN 978-0-521-31916-4.
- Branscombe, Peter; Buch, David (2001). "Gerl, Franz Xaver". Grove Music Online (8th ed.). Oxford University Press. doi:10.1093/omo/9781561592630.013.90000380878. ISBN 978-1-56159-263-0. (subscription, Wikilibrary access, or UK public library membership required)
