= Sebastian Mayer =

German opera singer

(Friedrich) Sebastian Mayer (actually Meier, 1773 – 9 May 1835) was a bass singer and stage director of the Classical era.

== Life ==
Mayer was born at Benediktbeuern. In 1793, he joined the theater company of Emanuel Schikaneder.

On 23 December 1797, he became the second husband of Josepha (Weber) Hofer, the sister of Constanze Mozart. Constanze was the widow of Mozart, who had died in 1791. Mayer's best man at this wedding was Emanuel Schikaneder.

In 1805, he participated in the premiere of Ludwig van Beethoven's opera Fidelio, taking the part of Pizarro. The role apparently was challenging, as the following quotation from Thayer's biography of Beethoven (p. 326) indicates:

the voice moves over a series of scales, played by all the strings, so that the singer at each note which he has to utter, hears an appoggiatura of a minor second from the orchestra. The Pizarro of 1805 was unable with all his gesticulation and writhing to avoid the difficulty, the more since the mischievous players in the orchestra below maliciously emphasized the minor second by accentuation. Don Pizarro, snorting with rage, was thus at the mercy of the bows of the fiddlers. This aroused laughter. The singer, whose conceit was thus wounded, thereupon flew into a rage and hurled at the composer among other remarks the words: 'My brother-in-law would never have written such damned nonsense.

Mayer was apparently at least partly responsible for the preparation of the production, as he was the recipient of a letter from Beethoven filled with complaints and asking for more rehearsal and preparation.

Mayer, who was also active as stage director at the Theater an der Wien, died in Vienna.

== Assessment ==
Mayer is described in Thayer's biography of Beethoven (p. 326) as "moderately gifted bass singer, but a very good actor, and of the noblest and most refined taste in vocal music, opera as well as oratorio".
