= Queen of the Night aria =

Aria from W. A. Mozart's opera The Magic Flute

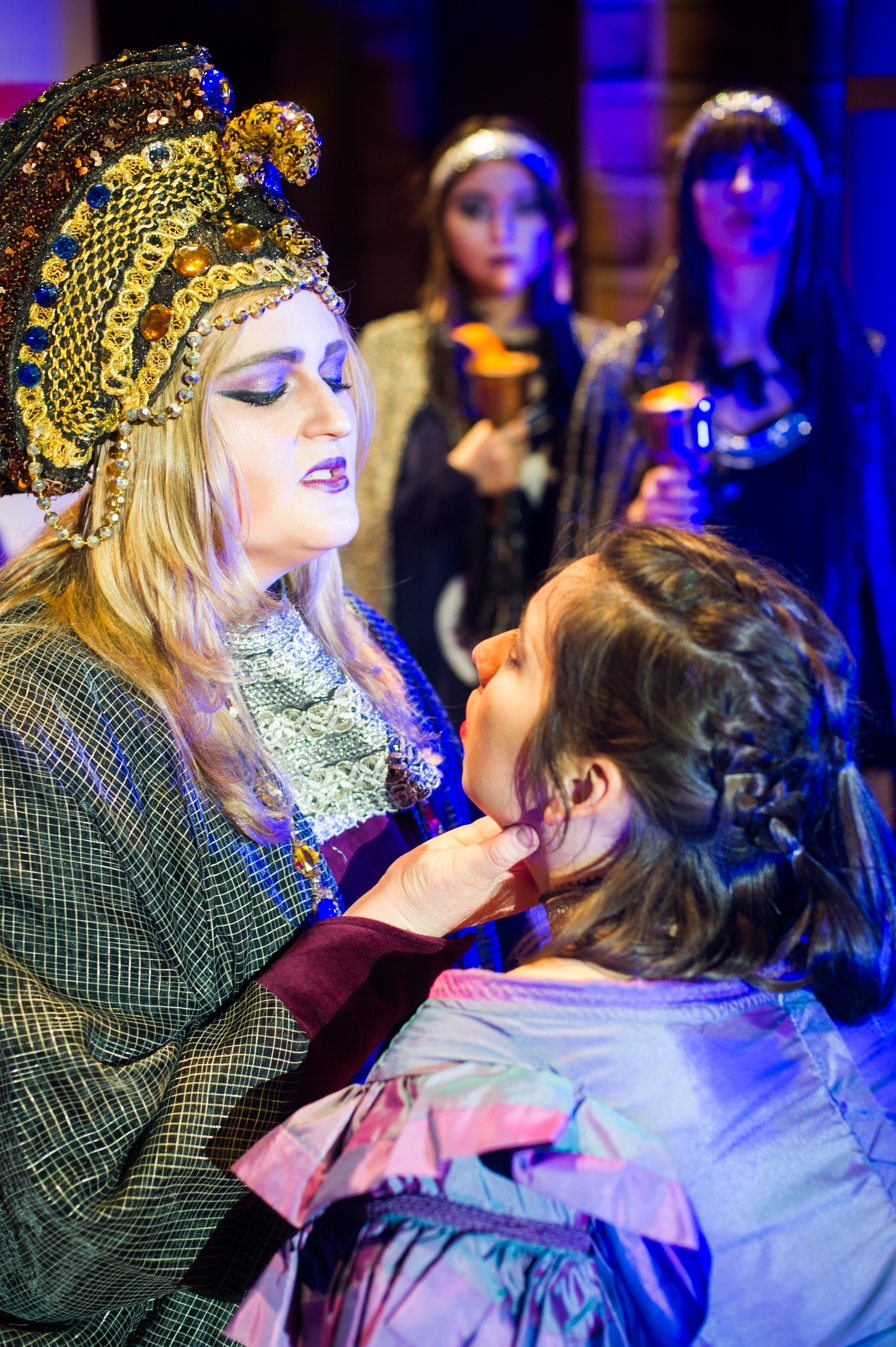
The Queen of the Night menaces Pamina. From a 2015 production of The Magic Flute at Texas A&M University–Commerce

"Der Hölle Rache kocht in meinem Herzen" ("Hell's vengeance boils in my heart"), commonly abbreviated "Der Hölle Rache", is an aria sung by the Queen of the Night, a coloratura soprano part, in the second act of Mozart's opera The Magic Flute (Die Zauberflöte). It depicts a fit of vengeful rage in which the Queen of the Night places a knife into the hand of her daughter Pamina and exhorts her to assassinate Sarastro, the Queen's rival, else she will disown and curse Pamina.

Memorable for its multiple upper register staccatos, the fast-paced and menacingly grandiose "Der Hölle Rache" is one of the most famous of all opera arias. This rage aria is often referred to as the Queen of the Night aria, although the Queen sings another distinguished aria earlier in the opera, "O zittre nicht, mein lieber Sohn".

== Libretto ==
The German libretto of The Magic Flute was written by Emanuel Schikaneder, who also led the theatre troupe that premiered the work and created the role of Papageno.

Der Hölle Rache kocht in meinem Herzen,
Tod und Verzweiflung flammet um mich her!
Fühlt nicht durch dich Sarastro Todesschmerzen,
So bist du meine Tochter nimmermehr:

Verstoßen sei auf ewig,
Verlassen sei auf ewig,
Zertrümmert sei'n auf ewig
Alle Bande der Natur.

Wenn nicht durch dich Sarastro wird erblassen!
Hört, Rachegötter, hört der Mutter Schwur!

Hell's vengeance boils in my heart,
Death and despair blaze about me!
If Sarastro doesn't feel the pain of death through you,
Then you will not be my daughter anymore:

Disowned be you forever,
Abandoned be you forever,
Destroyed be forever
All the bonds of nature.

If not through you Sarastro will turn pale!
Hear, gods of revenge, hear the mother's oath!

Metrically, the text consists of a quatrain in iambic pentameter (unusual for this opera which is mostly in iambic tetrameter), followed by a quatrain in iambic trimeter, then a final pentameter couplet. The rhyme scheme is [ABAB][CCCD][ED].

== Music ==
1953 recording
Rita Streich, RIAS Symphony Orchestra, Ferenc Fricsay

2006 recording
Siam Philharmonic Orchestra, conducted by Trisdee na Patalung

The aria is written in D minor, and is scored for pairs of flutes, oboes, bassoons, horns in F, and trumpets, along with timpani and the string section. This is a larger orchestra than for "O zittre nicht" and consists of all the players from the opera as a whole, except the clarinets and trombones.

The aria is renowned as a demanding piece to perform well. The vocal range covers two octaves, from F_{4} to F_{6} and requires a very high tessitura, A_{4} to C_{6}.

Thomas Bauman has expressed particular admiration for one moment in the score. At the climax of the aria, the Queen sings the words "Hört, hört, hört!" solo, in alternation with loud chords from the orchestra. The first two syllables are sung to D and F, suggesting to the listener a third one on A, completing the D minor triad. But, as Bauman writes:

Mozart's masterstroke is the transformation he brought about by moving from the third degree to the flat sixth rather than to the fifth. ... No matter how often one hears this passage ... one is led by musical logic to expect, after D and F, A. But the Queen sings a terrifying B♭ instead.

The effect is accompanied by unexpected Neapolitan harmony in the orchestra, with all the violins playing in unison high on the G string to intensify the sound.

== Performance history ==
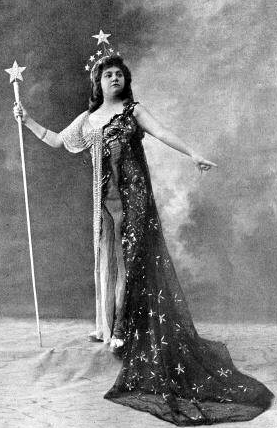
Alice Verlet as Queen of the Night, 1912

The first singer to perform the aria onstage was Mozart's sister-in-law Josepha Hofer, who at the time was 32. By all accounts, Hofer had an extraordinary upper register and an agile voice and apparently Mozart, being familiar with Hofer's vocal ability, wrote the two blockbuster arias to showcase it.

An anecdote from Mozart's time suggests that the composer himself was very impressed with his sister-in-law's performance. The story comes from an 1840 letter from composer Ignaz von Seyfried to librettist Georg Friedrich Treitschke, and relates an event from the last night of Mozart's life—4 December 1791, five weeks into the opera's initial (very successful) run. According to Seyfried, the dying Mozart whispered the following to his wife Constanze:

Quiet, quiet! Hofer is just taking her top F; – now my sister-in-law is singing her second aria, 'Der Hölle Rache'; how strongly she strikes and holds the B-flat: 'Hört! hört! hört! der Mutter Schwur!'

In modern times a number of notable sopranos have performed or recorded the aria. June Anderson sings it in the film Amadeus. The aria was also a favourite of the famously-incompetent soprano Florence Foster Jenkins.

A recording of the aria by Edda Moser, accompanied by the Bavarian State Opera under the baton of Wolfgang Sawallisch, is included in a collection of music from Earth on the Voyager 1 and Voyager 2 spacecraft.
