= The Magic Flute =

1791 opera by Wolfgang Amadeus Mozart

Die Zauberflöte The Magic Flute
- Opera by W. A. Mozart
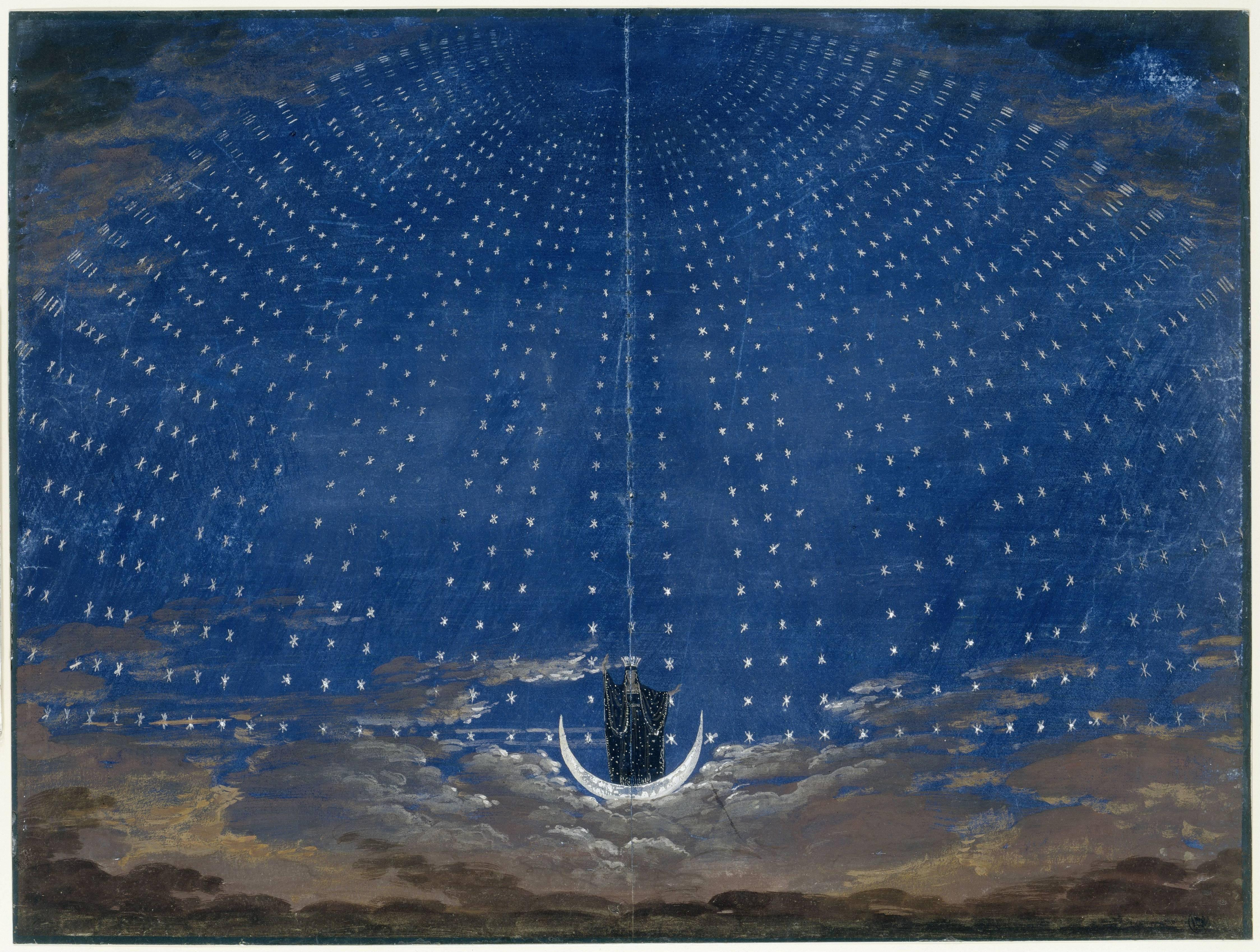
- The arrival of the Queen of the Night. Stage set by Karl Friedrich Schinkel for an 1815 production.
- Librettist: Emanuel Schikaneder
- Language: German
- Premiere: 30 September 1791; Theater auf der Wieden, Vienna

The Magic Flute (German: Die Zauberflöte, pronounced [diː ˈtsaʊbɐˌfløːtə]), K. 620, is an opera in two acts by Wolfgang Amadeus Mozart to a German libretto by Emanuel Schikaneder. It is a Singspiel, a popular form that included both singing and spoken dialogue. (Note: The genre of the work is hard to specify. The programme at the premiere performance announced it as Eine grosse oper (A grand opera). Mozart entered the work in his personal catalog as a "German opera", and the first printed libretto called it a Singspiel.) The work premiered on 30 September 1791 at Schikaneder's theatre, the Freihaus-Theater auf der Wieden in Vienna, just two months before Mozart's death. It was Mozart's last opera. It was an outstanding success from its first performances, and remains a staple of the opera repertory.

In the opera, the Queen of the Night persuades Prince Tamino to rescue her daughter Pamina from captivity under the high priest Sarastro; instead, he learns the high ideals of Sarastro's community and seeks to join it. Separately, then together, Tamino and Pamina undergo severe trials of initiation, which end in triumph, with the Queen and her cohorts vanquished. The earthy Papageno, who accompanies Tamino on his quest, fails the trials completely but is rewarded anyway with the hand of his ideal female companion Papagena.

== Composition ==
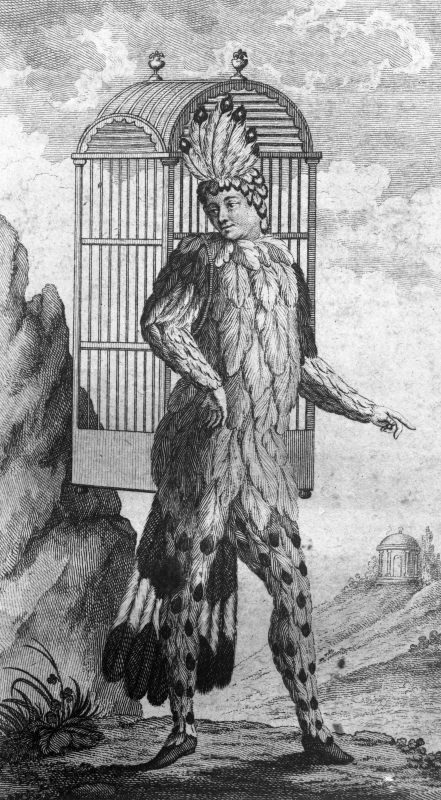
Emanuel Schikaneder, librettist of Die Zauberflöte, as Papageno

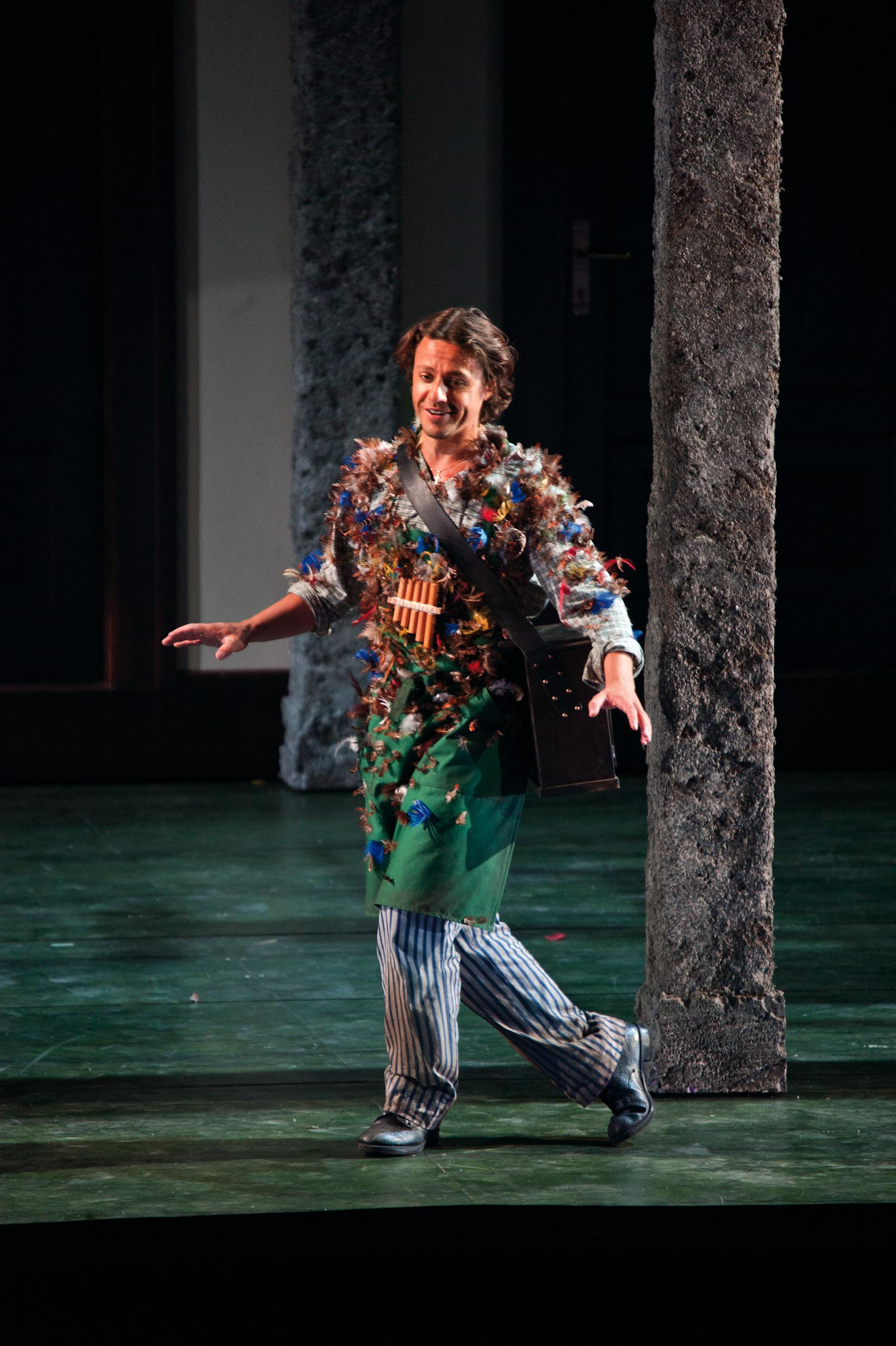
Baritone Markus Werba appearing as Papageno. He wears his pipes and carries his magic bells; both instruments are essential to the plot.

The opera was the culmination of Mozart's increasing involvement with Emanuel Schikaneder's theatrical troupe, which since 1789 had been the resident company at the Theater auf der Wieden. Mozart was a close friend of one of the singer-composers of the troupe, tenor Benedikt Schack (the first Tamino), and had contributed to the compositions of the troupe, which were often collaboratively written. Mozart's participation increased with his contributions to the 1790 collaborative opera Der Stein der Weisen (The Philosopher's Stone), including the duet ("Nun liebes Weibchen", K. 625/592a) among other passages. Like The Magic Flute, Der Stein der Weisen was a fairy-tale opera and can be considered a kind of precursor; it employed much the same cast in similar roles.

Schikaneder's libretto for The Magic Flute is thought by scholars to be based on many sources. Some works of literature that may have served as sources include the medieval romance Yvain by Chrétien de Troyes, the novel Life of Sethos by Jean Terrasson, and the essay "On the mysteries of the Egyptians" by Ignaz von Born. The libretto is also a natural continuation of a series of fairy tale operas produced at the time by Schikaneder's troupe, including an adaptation of Sophie Seyler's Singspiel Oberon as well as Der Stein der Weisen. Especially for the role of Papageno, the libretto draws on the Hanswurst tradition of the Viennese popular theatre. Many scholars also acknowledge an influence of Freemasonry. (Note: For detailed discussion of sources see Branscombe 1991 and Libretto of The Magic Flute.)

The Magic Flute appears to have two references to the music of Antonio Salieri. The first is that the Papageno–Papagena duet is similar to the Cucuzze cavatina in Salieri's Prima la musica e poi le parole. Both are centered around musical-textual playfulness with humorous bird-like utterances of pseudo-Italian words. The Magic Flute also echoes Salieri's music in that Papageno's whistle is based on a motif borrowed from Salieri's Concerto for Clavicembalo in B♭ major.

== Roles ==
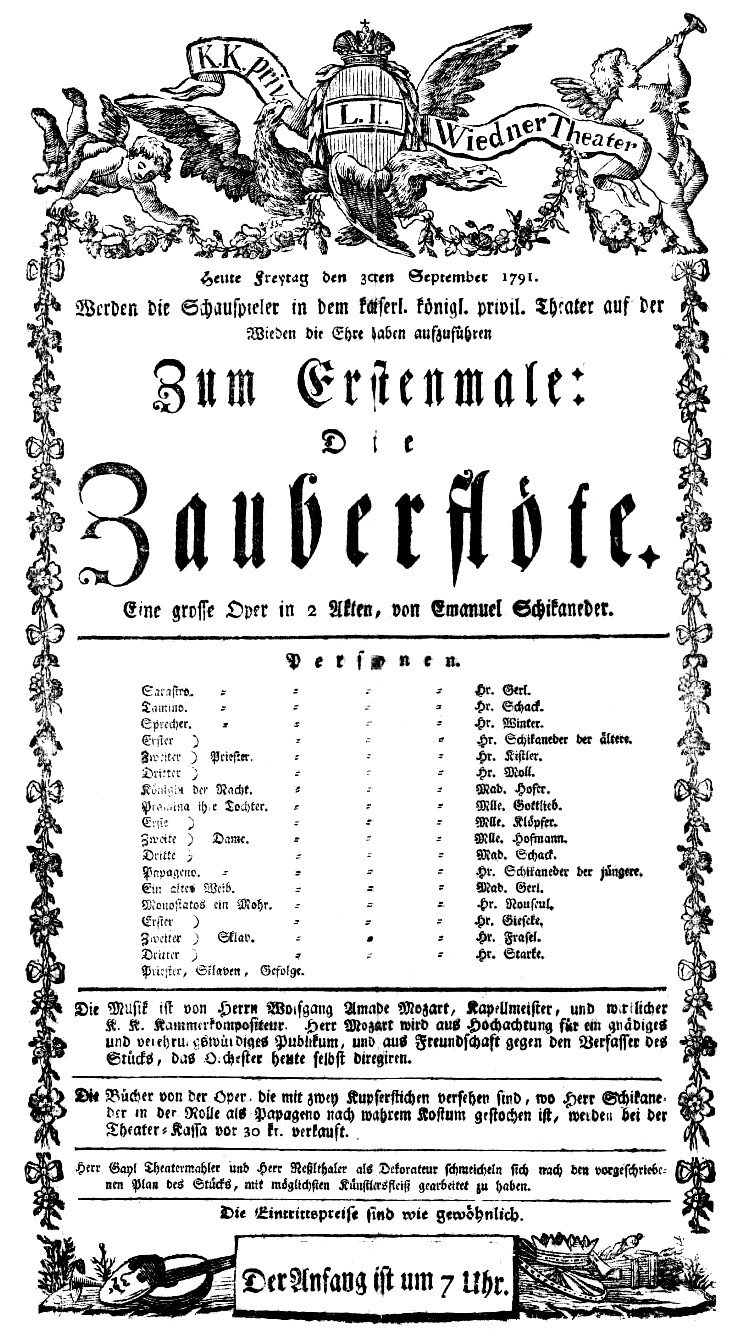
Playbill for the premiere (Note: I[mperial] & R[oyal] priv[ileged] Wieden Theatre / Today, Friday 30 September 1791. / The actors of the Imperial and Royal privileged Theatre on the Wieden will have the honour to perform / For the first time: / Die Zauberflöte. / A grand opera in 2 acts, by Emanuel Schikaneder. / Characters. / Sarastro. ... Hr. Gerl. / Tamino. ... Hr. Schack. / Speaker. ... Hr. Winter / {First, Second, Third} priest {...} {Hr. Schikaneder the elder. Hr. Kistler. Hr. Moll.} / Queen of the Night ... Mad. Hofer. / Pamina, her daughter. ... Mlle. Gottlieb. / {First, Second, Third} lady. ... {Mlle. Klöpfer. Mlle. Hofmann. Mad. Schack.} / Papageno. ... Hr. Schikaneder the younger. / An old woman [i.e., Papagena]. ... Mad. Gerl. / Monostatos a Moor. ... Hr. Nouseul. / {First, Second, Third} slave. ... {Hr. Gieseke. Hr. Frasel. Hr. Starke.} / Priests, slaves, retinue. / The music is by Herr Wolfgang Amade Mozart, Kapellmeister, an actual I[mperial] and R[oyal] Chamber Composer. Herr Mozart, out of respect for a gracious and honourable public, and from friendship for the author of this piece, will today direct the orchestra in person. / The book of the opera, furnished with two copper-plates, on which is engraved Herr Schikaneder in the costume he wears for the role of Papageno, may be had at the box office for 30 kr[eutzer]. / Herr Gayl, theatre painter, and Herr Nesslthaler as designer, flatter themselves that they have worked with the utmost artistic zeal according to the prescribed plan of the piece. / Prices of admission are as usual. / To begin at 7 o'clock. (According to English translation from Deutsch 1966, pp. 407–408))

Roles, voice types as originally written and contemporary classification, premiere cast
Role	Voice type	Contemporary classification	Premiere cast, 30 September 1791 Conductor: Wolfgang Amadeus Mozart
Tamino	tenor	tenor	Benedikt Schack
Papageno	bass	baritone	Emanuel Schikaneder
Pamina	soprano	soprano	Anna Gottlieb
The Queen of the Night (Note: German: Königin der Nacht. The Queen is sometimes referred to by the name Astrifiammante, an Italian translation of the German adjective sternflammende ("star-blazing") in the original libretto)	soprano	coloratura soprano	Josepha Hofer
Sarastro	bass	bass	Franz Xaver Gerl
Three ladies	3 sopranos	sopranos, mezzo-soprano	M^{lle} Klöpfer, M^{lle} Hofmann, Elisabeth Schack
Monostatos	tenor	baritone	Johann Joseph Nouseul
Three boys	soprano (Note: The three child-spirits are often portrayed by young boy singers but also sometimes by mature women, particularly in studio recordings)	treble, alto, mezzo-soprano	Anna Schikaneder; Anselm Handelgruber; Franz Anton Maurer
Speaker of the temple (German: Sprecher)	bass	bass-baritone	Herr Winter
First Priest	tenor	tenor	Johann Michael Kistler
First armoured man	tenor	tenor	Johann Michael Kistler
Second Priest	bass	bass	Urban Schikaneder
Third Priest	speaking role	bass	Herr Moll
Second armoured man	bass	bass	Herr Moll
Papagena	soprano	soprano	Barbara Gerl
Three slaves	speaking roles	bass, 2 tenors	Karl Ludwig Giesecke, Herr Frasel, Herr Starke
Priests, women, people, slaves, chorus

The names of the performers at the premiere are taken from a preserved playbill for this performance (at right), which does not give full names; "Hr." = Herr, Mr.; "Mme." = Madame, Mrs.; "Mlle." = Mademoiselle, Miss.

While the female roles in the opera are assigned to different voice types, the playbill for the premiere performance referred to all of the female singers as "sopranos". The casting of the roles relies on the actual vocal range of the part.

== Orchestration ==
The work is scored for two flutes (one doubling on piccolo), two oboes, two clarinets (doubling basset horns), two bassoons, two horns, two trumpets, three trombones (alto, tenor, and bass), timpani and strings. It also requires a four-part chorus for several numbers (notably the finales of each act). Mozart also called for a stromento d'acciaio (instrument of steel) to perform Papageno's magic bells. This instrument has since been lost to history, though modern day scholars believe it to be a keyed glockenspiel, which is usually replaced with a celesta in modern-day performances.

Charles Rosen has remarked on the character of Mozart's orchestration:

Die Zauberflöte has the greatest variety of orchestral color that the eighteenth century was to know; the very lavishness, however, is paradoxically also an economy as each effect is a concentrated one, each one—Papageno's whistle, the Queen of the Night's coloratura, the bells, Sarastro's trombones, even the farewell in scene 1 for clarinets and pizzicato strings—a single dramatic stroke."

== Synopsis ==
=== Overture ===
The overture, composed after the other parts of the opera were complete, begins with a solemn three-chord sequence from the brass, associated with the Priests of the Temple of Wisdom. (The number three is highly significant in Freemasonry and recurs as the number of ladies, boys and temples.) It transitions in an adagio to a lively fugue in E♭ major.

Halfway through, there is a false ending. After another three-chord brass sequence, the fugue resumes in E♭ minor, returning to E♭ major.

=== Act 1 ===
==== Scene 1: A rough, rocky landscape ====
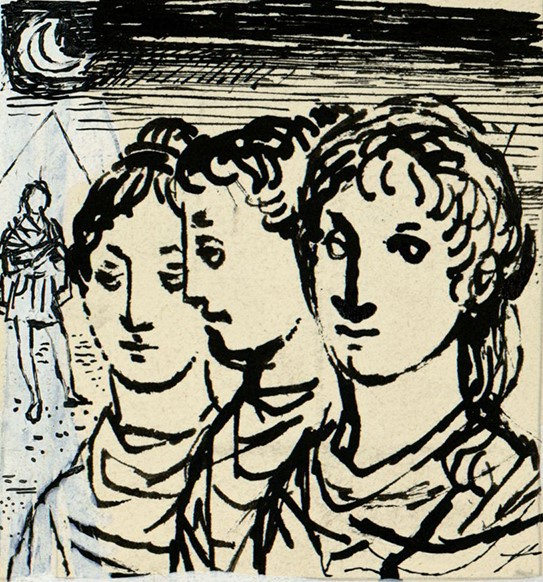
Libretto cover design by Peter Hoffer, 1959. From the opening scene: the Three Ladies, with Tamino in the distance, standing before a pyramid.

Tamino, a handsome prince lost in a distant land, is pursued by a serpent and asks the gods to save him (aria: "Zu Hilfe! Zu Hilfe!" / Help! Help!, segued into trio "Stirb, Ungeheuer, durch uns're Macht!" / Die, monster, by our might!). He faints, and three ladies, attendants of the Queen of the Night, appear and kill the serpent. They find the unconscious prince extremely attractive, and each of them tries to persuade the other two to leave her alone with him. After arguing, they reluctantly decide to leave together.

Tamino wakes up and is surprised to find himself still alive and the serpent dead. Papageno enters dressed as a bird. He describes his life as a bird-catcher, complaining he has no wife or girlfriend (aria: "Der Vogelfänger bin ich ja" / The birdcatcher am I indeed). Tamino introduces himself to Papageno, thinking Papageno killed the serpent. Papageno happily takes the credit – claiming he strangled it with his bare hands. The three ladies suddenly reappear and instead of giving Papageno wine, cake and figs, they give him water and a stone, and padlock his mouth closed as a warning not to lie. They give Tamino a portrait of the Queen of the Night's daughter Pamina, with whom Tamino falls instantly in love (aria: "Dies Bildnis ist bezaubernd schön" / This portrait is enchantingly beautiful).

The ladies return and tell Tamino that Pamina has been captured by Sarastro, whom they describe as a powerful, evil demon. Tamino vows to rescue Pamina. The Queen of the Night appears and promises Tamino that Pamina will be his wife if he rescues her from Sarastro (Recitative: "O zittre nicht, mein lieber Sohn" / Oh, tremble not, my dear son! – and aria: "Du, Du, Du wirst sie zu befreien gehen / You will go to free her). The Queen and the ladies leave and Papageno can only hum to bemoan the padlock on his mouth. (Quintet: "Hm! Hm! Hm! Hm!"). The ladies return and remove the padlock with a warning not to lie any more. They give Tamino a magic flute which has the power to change sorrow into joy, and Papageno magic bells for protection, telling him to go with Tamino. The ladies tell of three boys who will guide Tamino and Papageno to Sarastro's temple. Together Tamino and Papageno set forth.

==== Scene 2: A room in Sarastro's palace ====
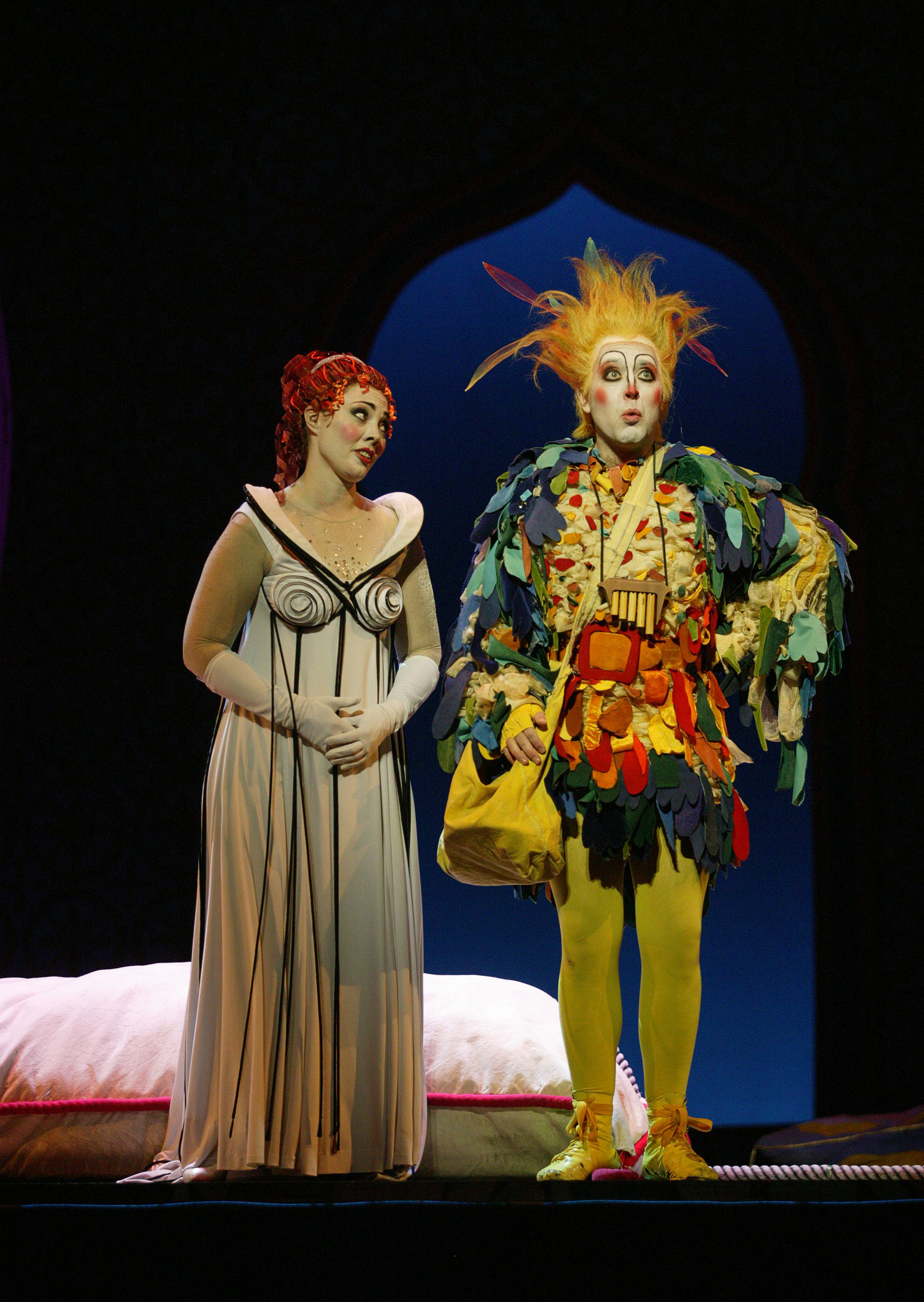
Pamina (Tiffany Speight) and Papageno (Richard Burkhard) sing "Bei Männern, welche Liebe fühlen" in a 2006 New Zealand Opera production

Pamina is dragged in by Sarastro's slaves, having tried to escape. Monostatos, a blackamoor and chief of the slaves, orders them to chain her and leave her alone with him. Papageno, sent ahead by Tamino to help find Pamina, enters (Trio: "Du feines Täubchen, nur herein!" / Just come in, you fine little dove!). Monostatos and Papageno are each terrified by the other's strange appearance and both flee, each thinking the other is the devil. Papageno returns and announces to Pamina that her mother has sent Tamino to save her. Pamina rejoices to hear that Tamino is in love with her. She offers sympathy and hope to Papageno, who longs for a wife. Together they reflect on the joys and sacred value of marital love (duet: "Bei Männern welche Liebe fühlen" / In men, who feel love).

==== Finale. Scene 3: A grove in front of a temple ====
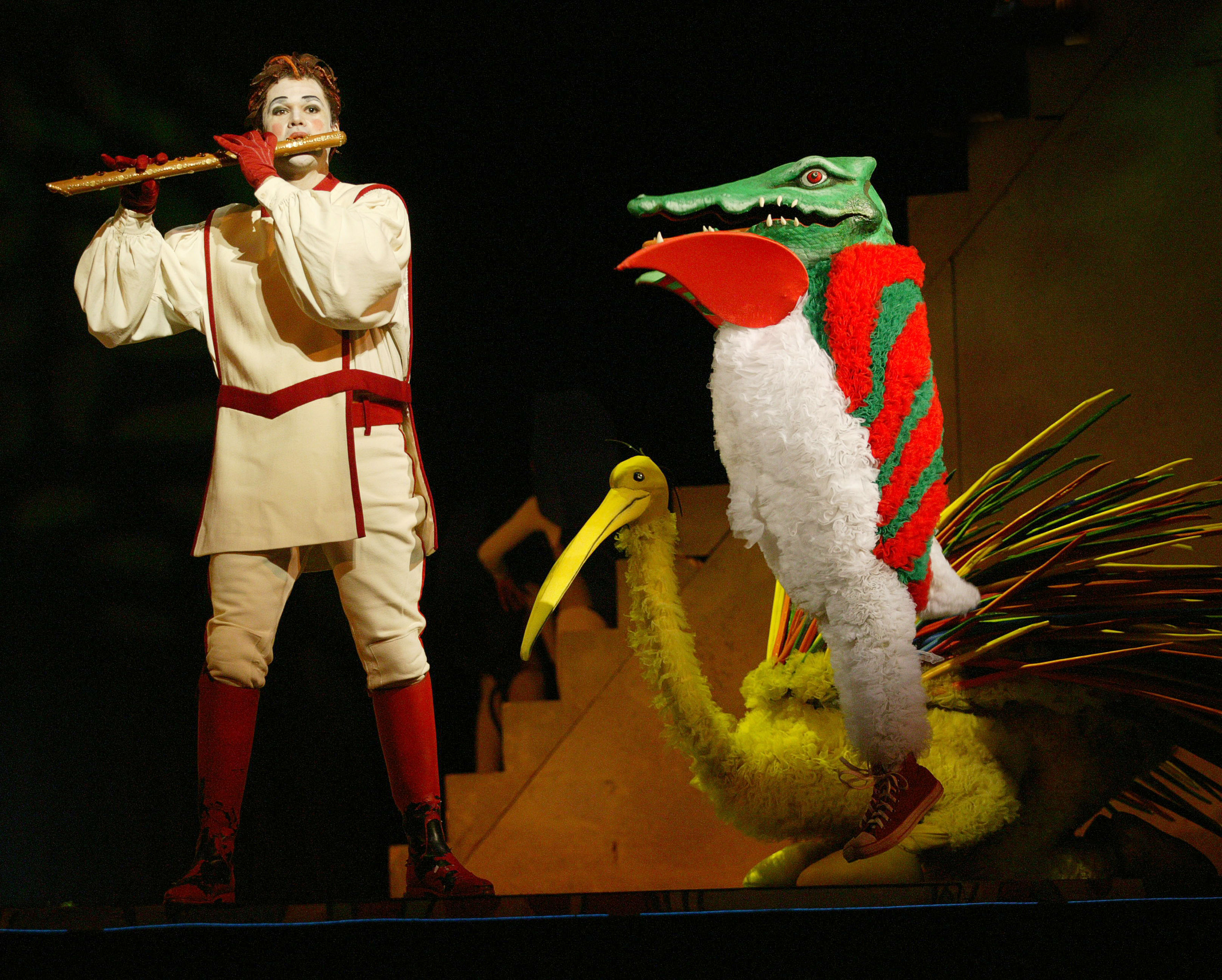
Tamino charms the animals with his flute.

The three boys lead Tamino to Sarastro's temple, promising that if he remains patient, wise and steadfast, he will succeed in rescuing Pamina (Quartet: "Zum Ziele führt dich diese Bahn" / This path leads you to your goal). Tamino approaches the right-hand entrance (the Temple of Reason) and is denied access by voices from within. The same happens when he goes to the entrance on the left (the Temple of Nature). But from the entrance in the middle (the Temple of Wisdom), a senior priest appears. (The priest is referred to as "The Speaker" in the libretto, but his role is sung.) He tells Tamino that Sarastro is benevolent, not evil, and that he should not trust the Queen of the Night. With a hidden male chorus, he promises that Tamino's confusion will be lifted when he approaches the temple in a spirit of friendship, and that Pamina is alive. Tamino plays his magic flute. Animals appear and dance, enraptured, to his music. Tamino hears Papageno's pipes sounding offstage, and hurries off to find him (aria: "Wie stark ist nicht dein Zauberton" / How strong is thy magic tone).

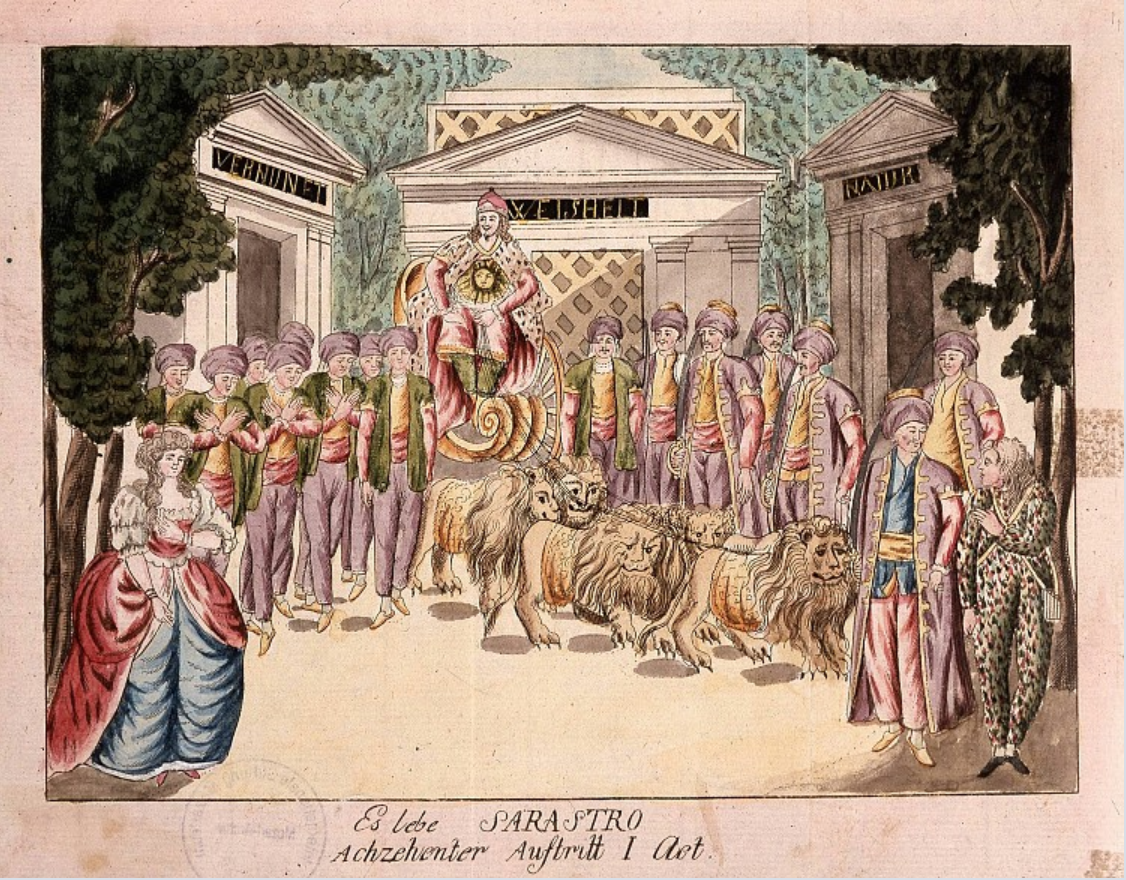
Arrival of Sarastro on a chariot pulled by lions, from a 1793 production in Brno. Pamina appears at left, Papageno at right. In the background are the temples of Wisdom, Reason, and Nature.

Papageno and Pamina enter, searching for Tamino (trio: "Schnelle Füße, rascher Mut" / Swift steps, ready courage). They are recaptured by Monostatos and his slaves. Papageno plays his magic bells, causing Monostatos and his slaves to dance off the stage, mesmerised by the beauty of the music (chorus: "Das klinget so herrlich" / That sounds so splendid). Papageno and Pamina hear the sound of Sarastro's retinue approaching. Papageno is frightened and asks Pamina what they should say. She answers that they must tell the truth. Sarastro enters, with a crowd of followers. (chorus: "Es lebe Sarastro!" / Long live Sarastro!) Pamina falls at Sarastro's feet and confesses that she tried to escape because Monostatos had forced his attentions on her. Sarastro receives her kindly and assures her that he wishes only for her happiness, but he refuses to return her to her mother, whom he describes as a proud, headstrong woman, and a bad influence on those around her. Pamina, he says, must be guided by a man.

Monostatos brings in Tamino. The two lovers see one another for the first time and embrace, causing indignation among Sarastro's followers. Monostatos tells Sarastro that he caught Papageno and Pamina trying to escape, and demands a reward. Sarastro ironically "rewards" Monostatos with a beating and sends him away. He announces that Tamino and Pamina must both undergo trials to be purified. The priests declare that virtue and righteousness will sanctify life and make mortals like gods ("Wenn Tugend und Gerechtigkeit" / If virtue and justice).

=== Act 2 ===
==== Scene 1: A grove of palms ====
The council of priests of Isis and Osiris, headed by Sarastro, enters to the sound of a solemn march. Sarastro tells the priests that Tamino is ready to undergo the ordeals that will lead to enlightenment. He invokes the gods Isis and Osiris, asking them to protect Tamino and Pamina (Aria and chorus: "O Isis und Osiris / O Isis and Osiris").

==== Scene 2: The courtyard of the Temple of Ordeal ====
Tamino and Papageno are led in by two priests for the first trial. The two priests advise Tamino and Papageno of the dangers ahead of them, warn them of women's wiles and swear them to silence (Duet: "Bewahret euch von Weibertücken" / Keep yourselves from women's tricks). The three ladies appear and remind Tamino and Papageno of what the Queen has said about Sarastro, trying to tempt them into speaking. (Quintet: "Wie, wie, wie" / How, how, how) Papageno cannot resist answering the ladies, but Tamino remains aloof, angrily instructing Papageno not to listen to the ladies' threats and to keep quiet. Seeing that Tamino will not speak to them, the ladies withdraw in confusion. The Speaker and a priest return and lead Tamino and Papageno away.

==== Scene 3: A garden ====
Pamina is asleep. Monostatos creeps in and ogles her. (Aria: "Alles fühlt der Liebe Freuden" / All feel the joys of love) He is about to kiss her, when the Queen of the Night appears. Monostatos hides. Waking, Pamina tells her that Tamino is joining Sarastro's brotherhood and that she is thinking of accompanying him. The Queen is not pleased. She explains that her husband, the previous owner of the temple, on his deathbed gave the ownership to Sarastro instead of to her, rendering the Queen powerless (this is in the original libretto, but is usually omitted from modern productions). She gives Pamina a dagger, ordering her to kill Sarastro with it and threatening to disown her if she does not. (Aria: "Der Hölle Rache kocht in meinem Herzen" / Hell's vengeance boils in my heart). She leaves. Monostatos returns and tries to force Pamina's love by threatening to reveal the Queen's plot, but Sarastro enters and drives him off. Pamina begs Sarastro to forgive her mother and he reassures her that revenge and cruelty have no place in his domain (Aria: "In diesen heil'gen Hallen" / Within these sacred halls).

==== Scene 4: A hall in the Temple of Ordeal ====
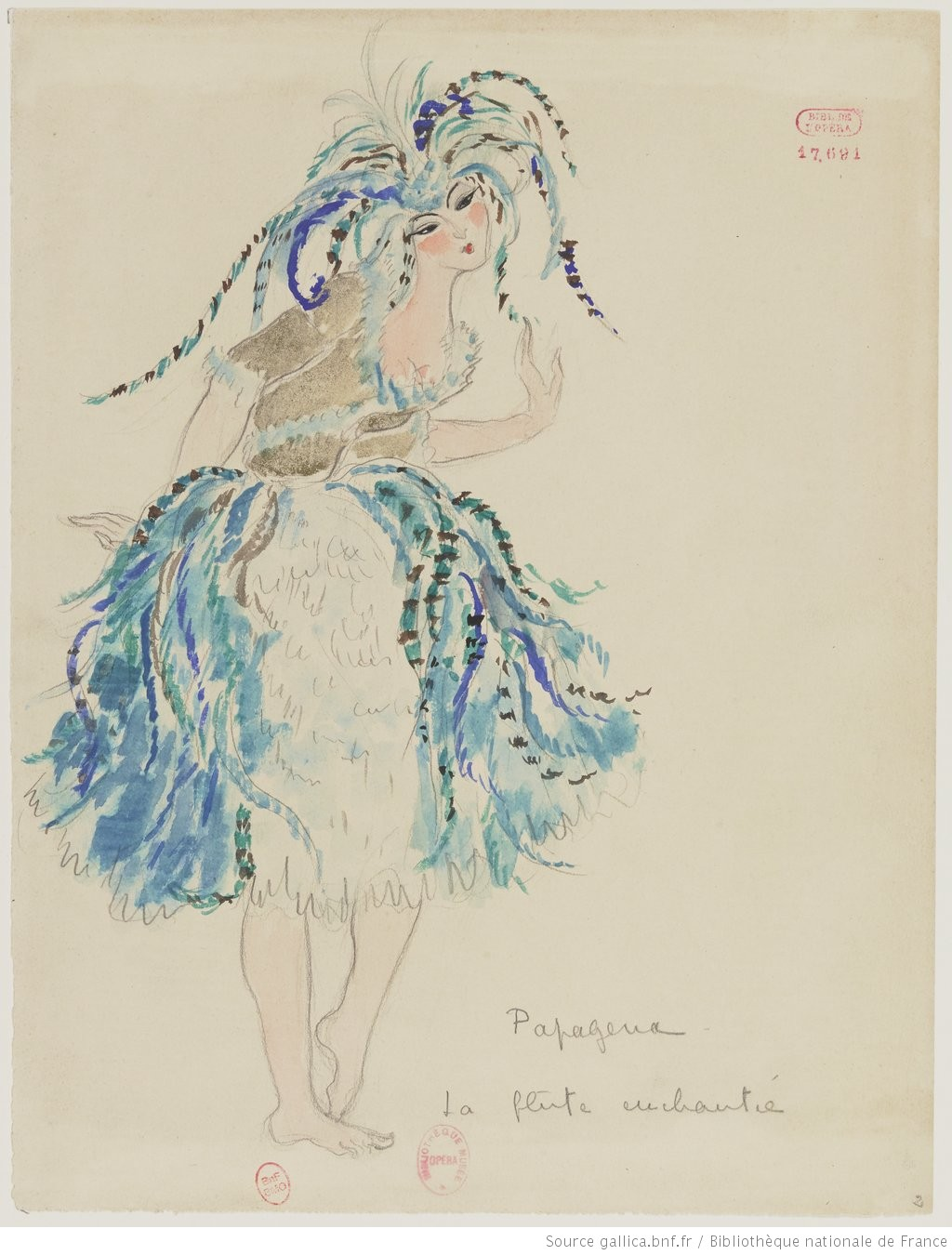
Papagena as imagined by Jacques Drésa for a 1922 performance

Tamino and Papageno are led in by priests, who remind them that they must remain silent. Papageno complains of thirst. An old woman enters and offers Papageno a cup of water. He drinks and teasingly asks whether she has a boyfriend. She replies that she does and that his name is Papageno. She disappears as Papageno asks for her name, and the three boys bring in food, the magic flute, and the bells, sent from Sarastro (Trio: "Seid uns zum zweiten Mal willkommen" / We welcome you a second time). Tamino begins to play the flute, which summons Pamina. She tries to speak with him, but Tamino, bound by his vow of silence, cannot answer her, and Pamina begins to believe that he no longer loves her. (Aria: "Ach, ich fühl's, es ist verschwunden" / Oh, I feel it, it is gone) She leaves in despair.

==== Scene 5: The pyramids ====
The priests celebrate Tamino's successes so far, and pray that he will succeed and become worthy of their order (Chorus: "O Isis und Osiris" / O Isis and Osiris). Pamina is brought in and Sarastro instructs Pamina and Tamino to bid each other farewell before the greater trials ahead, alarming them by describing it as their "final farewell". (Trio: Sarastro, Pamina, Tamino – "Soll ich dich, Teurer, nicht mehr sehn?" / Shall I see you no more, dear one? — Note: In order to preserve the continuity of Pamina's suicidal feelings, this trio is sometimes performed earlier in act 2, preceding or immediately following the chorus "O Isis und Osiris". (Note: For instance, in the videotaped performance from the Bayerisches Staatsoper, Munich, 19 September 1983, available from Deutsche Grammophon)) They exit and Papageno enters. The priests grant his request for a glass of wine and he expresses his desire for a wife. (Aria: "Ein Mädchen oder Weibchen" / A girl or a woman). The elderly woman reappears and warns him that unless he immediately promises to marry her, he will be imprisoned forever. When Papageno promises to love her faithfully (muttering that he will only do this until something better comes along), she is transformed into the young and pretty Papagena. Papageno rushes to embrace her, but the priests drive him back, telling him that he is not yet worthy of her.

==== Finale. Scene 6: A garden ====
The three boys hail the dawn. They observe Pamina, who is contemplating suicide because she believes Tamino has abandoned her. The boys restrain her and reassure her of Tamino's love. (Quartet: "Bald prangt, den Morgen zu verkünden" / To herald the morning, soon will shine). The scene changes without a break, leading into scene 7.

==== Scene 7: At the Mountains of Ordeal ====
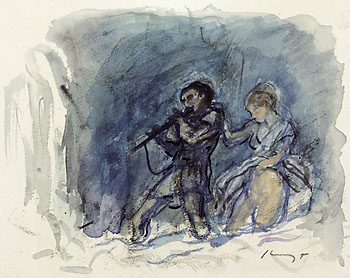
Tamino and Pamina undergo their final trial; watercolor by Max Slevogt (1868–1932)

(One mountain has a waterfall, the other emits fire.) Two men in armour lead Tamino in. They promise enlightenment to those who successfully overcome the fear of death ("Der, welcher wandert diese Strasse voll Beschwerden" / He who walks this path weighed down with cares – sung to a Baroque chorale prelude, inspired by Martin Luther's hymn "Ach Gott, vom Himmel sieh darein" / Oh God, look down from heaven (Note: The hymn was translated by Martin Luther in 1524 from the eleventh Psalm)). Tamino declares that he is ready to be tested. Pamina calls to him from offstage. The men in armour assure him that the trial by silence is over and he is free to speak with her. Pamina enters and declares her intention to undergo the remaining trials with him. She hands him the magic flute to help them through the trials ("Tamino mein, o welch ein Glück! / Oh, what luck, my Tamino!"). Protected by the music of the magic flute, they pass unscathed through fire and water. Offstage, the priests hail their triumph and invite the couple to enter the temple. The scene changes without a break, leading into scene 8.

==== Scene 8: A garden with a tree ====
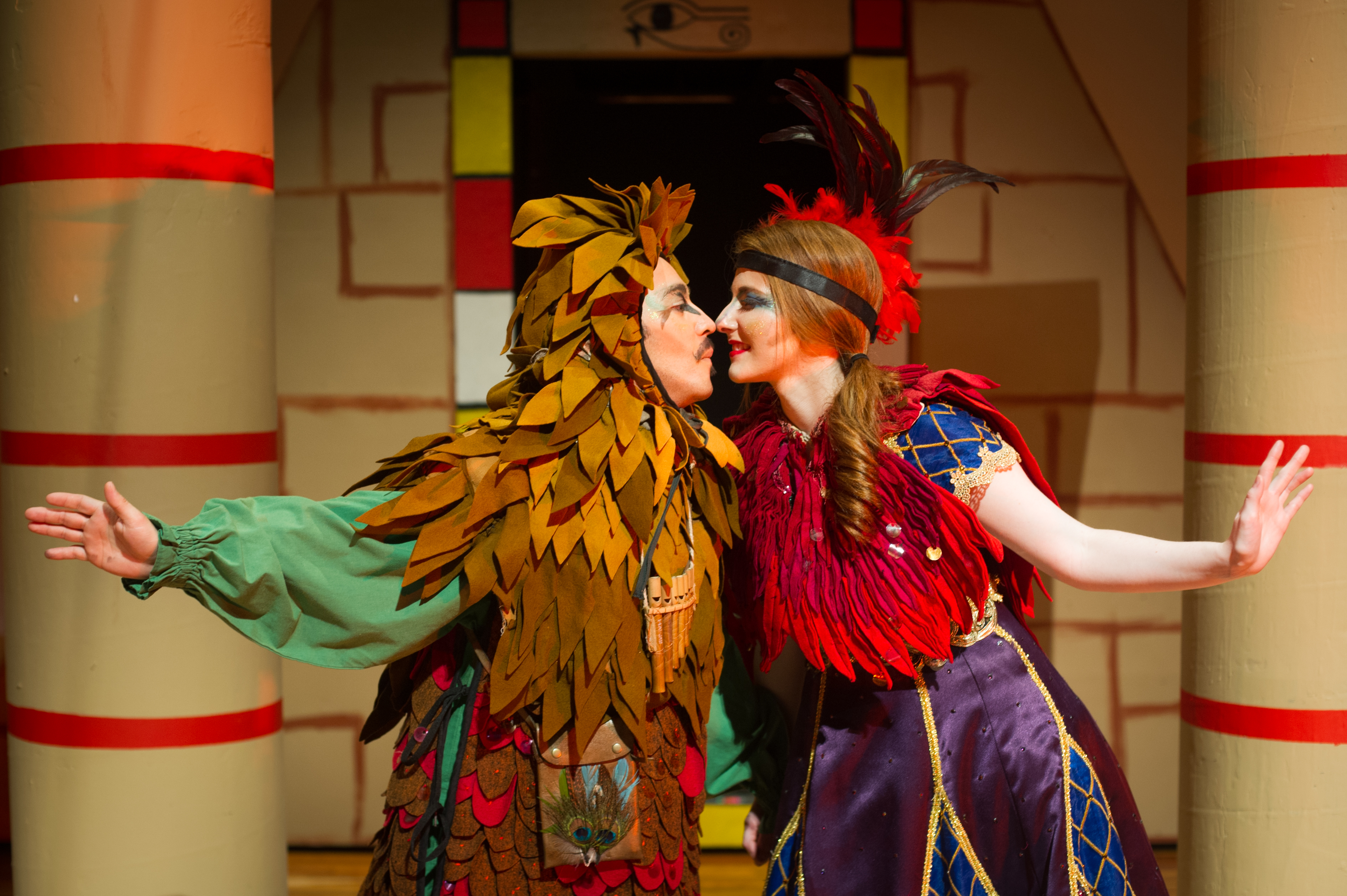
Papageno and Papagena; from a production at Texas A&M University–Commerce

Papageno despairs at having lost Papagena and decides to hang himself (Aria/Quartet: "Papagena! Papagena! Papagena! Weibchen, Täubchen, meine Schöne" / Papagena! Papagena! Papagena! Dear woman, dear dove, my beauty). He hesitates, counting to three, but more and more slowly. The three boys appear and stop him. They remind him he can play his magic bells to summon Papagena. She appears and, united, the happy couple stutter in astonishment and make bird-like courting sounds at each other. They plan their future and dream of the many children they will have together (Duet: "Pa-Pa-Pa-Papageno"). (Note: For the origin of this duet, see Emanuel Schikaneder) The scenes change without a break, leading into scene 9.

==== Scene 9: A rocky landscape outside the temple; night ====
Monostatos appears with the Queen of the Night and her three ladies. They plot to destroy the temple ("Nur stille, stille" / Just quiet, quiet) and the Queen confirms her promise to give Pamina to Monostatos, but suddenly, with thunder and lightning, they are cast out into eternal night. The scene changes without a break, leading into scene 10.

==== Scene 10: The Temple of the Sun ====
Sarastro announces the sun's triumph over the night and the fraudulent power of hypocrites. The chorus hails the newly consecrated Tamino and Pamina, and gives thanks to Isis and Osiris.

== Premiere and reception ==
The opera premiered in Vienna on 30 September 1791 at the suburban Freihaus-Theater auf der Wieden. Mozart conducted the orchestra (Note: This is known from testimony by Ignaz von Seyfried (1776–1841), a composer who later (1798) became the musical director at the same theatre. According to Seyfried's memories (which he published in the Neue Zeitschrift für Musik, vol. 12, 6June 1848, p. 184), "[Mozart] personally directed the premiere there on 30 September 1791, at which Süßmayr, the faithful Pylades, sat to his right, diligently turning the pages of the score." The description implies that Mozart was seated at a keyboard instrument, playing along with the orchestra, rather than standing on a podium with a baton; this was fairly standard practice for conductors in Mozart's time. Mozart conducted only the first two performances, whereupon direction was taken over by the regular leader of the orchestra, Johann Baptist Henneberg (Abert 2007, 1246).) and Schikaneder himself played Papageno, while the role of the Queen of the Night was sung by Mozart's sister-in-law Josepha Hofer.

On the reception of the opera, Mozart scholar Maynard Solomon writes:

Although there were no reviews of the first performances, it was immediately evident that Mozart and Schikaneder had achieved a great success, the opera drawing immense crowds and reaching hundreds of performances during the 1790s.

As Mozart's letters show, he was very pleased to have achieved such a success. Solomon continues:

Mozart's delight is reflected in his last three letters, written to Constanze, who with her sister Sophie was spending the second week of October in Baden. "I have this moment returned from the opera, which was as full as ever", he wrote on 7 October, listing the numbers that had to be encored. "But what always gives me the most pleasure is the silent approval! You can see how this opera is becoming more and more esteemed." ... He went to hear his opera almost every night, taking along [friends and] relatives.

The opera celebrated its 100th performance in November 1792, though Mozart did not have the pleasure of witnessing this milestone, as he had died on 5 December 1791. The opera was first performed outside Vienna (21 September 1792) in Lemberg, then in Prague. It then made "triumphal progress through Germany's opera houses great and small", and with the early 19th century spread to essentially all the countries of Europe—and eventually, everywhere in the world—where opera is cultivated.

As Peter Branscombe documents, the earlier performances were often of highly altered, sometimes even mutilated, versions of the opera (see Ludwig Wenzel Lachnith). Productions of the past century have tended to be more faithful to Mozart's music, though faithful rendering of Mozart and Schikaneder's original (quite explicit) stage directions and dramatic vision continues to be rare; with isolated exceptions, modern productions strongly reflect the creative preferences of the stage director.

The Magic Flute is among the most frequently performed of all operas.

Critic of the 1970s, Pauline Kael once described the opera as making a "special claim on one's affections, because its libretto is high camp. It's a peerlessly silly masterpiece: sublimely lucid music arising out of a parodistic fairy tale that celebrates in all seriousness the exalted brotherhood of the Freemasons."

== First publication ==
On 28 December 1791, three and a half weeks after Mozart's death, his widow Constanze offered to send a manuscript score of The Magic Flute to the electoral court in Bonn. Nikolaus Simrock published this text in the first full-score edition (Bonn, 1814), claiming that it was "in accordance with Mozart's own wishes" (Allgemeine musikalische Zeitung, 13 September 1815).

== Themes ==
The Magic Flute is noted for its prominent Masonic elements, although some scholars hold that the Masonic influence is exaggerated. Schikaneder and Mozart were Freemasons, as was Ignaz Alberti, engraver and printer of the first libretto. The opera is also influenced by Enlightenment philosophy and can be regarded as advocating enlightened absolutism. The Queen of the Night is seen by some to represent a dangerous form of obscurantism, by others to represent Roman Catholic Empress Maria Theresa, who banned Freemasonry from Austria. Still others see the Roman Catholic Church itself, which was and still is strongly anti-Masonic. Likewise, the literature repeatedly addresses the fact that the central theme of the work is not only "love", but also becoming a better person by overcoming trials (similar to Wagner's Parsifal later on).

== Musical numbers ==
Overture. The overture is frequently played on its own.	Overture
Act 1; 1. Introduction: "Zu Hilfe! Zu Hilfe! Sonst bin ich verloren" – Tamino, Three Ladies	"Zu Hilfe!"
2. Aria: "Der Vogelfänger bin ich ja" – Papageno	"Der Vogelfänger bin ich ja"
3. Aria: "Dies Bildnis ist bezaubernd schön" – Tamino	"Dies Bildnis ..."
4. Recitative and aria: "O zittre nicht, mein lieber Sohn" – The Queen of the Night	"O zittre nicht"
5 Quintet: "Hm Hm Hm" – Tamino, Papageno, Three Ladies	"Hm, hm, hm"
6. Terzet: "Du feines Täubchen, nur herein!" – Monostatos, Pamina, Papageno	"Du feines Täubchen"
7. Duet: "Bei Männern, welche Liebe fühlen" – Pamina and Papageno	"Bei Männern"
8. Finale 1: "Zum Ziele führt dich diese Bahn"; "Wie stark ist nicht dein Zauberton" "Schnelle Füße, rascher Mut ... Das klinget so herrlich" "Es lebe Sarastro"	"Zum Ziele ..." "Wie stark ..." "Schnelle Füße ... Das klinget" "Es lebe Sarastro"
Act 2; 9. March of the Priests	March of the Priests
10. Aria with chorus: "O Isis und Osiris" – Sarastro	"O Isis und Osiris"
11. Duet: "Bewahret euch vor Weibertücken" – Second Priest, Speaker	"Bewahret euch"
12. Quintet: "Wie? Ihr an diesem Schreckensort?" – Three Ladies, Tamino, Papageno	"Wie?"
13. Aria: "Alles fühlt der Liebe Freuden" – Monostatos	"Alles fühlt"
14. Aria: "Der Hölle Rache kocht in meinem Herzen" – The Queen of the Night	"Der Hölle Rache"
15. Aria: "In diesen heil'gen Hallen" – Sarastro	"In diesen heil'gen Hallen"
16. Terzet: "Seid uns zum zweitenmal willkommen" – Three Boys	"Seid uns zum zweiten Mal"
17. Aria: "Ach, ich fühl's, es ist verschwunden" – Pamina	"Ach, ich fühl's"
18. Chorus: "O Isis und Osiris" – Priests	O Isis und Osiris
19. Terzet: "Soll ich dich, Teurer, nicht mehr seh'n?" – Pamina, Tamino, Sarastro	Soll ich dich, Teurer
20. Aria: "Ein Mädchen oder Weibchen" (A girl or a woman) – Papageno	"Ein Mädchen oder Weibchen"
21. Finale 2: "Bald prangt, den Morgen zu verkünden"; "Der, welcher wandert diese Straße voll Beschwerden" "Tamino mein! ... Triumph, Triumph! du edles Paar! Besieget hast du die Gefahr!" "Papagena! Weibchen, Täubchen, meine Schöne ... Pa-Pa-Pa-Pa-Pa" "Nur stille" "Die Strahlen der Sonne vertreiben die Nacht ... Es siegte die Stärke"	"Bald prangt" "Der, welcher wandert" "Tamino mein! ... Triumph!" "Papagena! ... Pa-Pa-Pa..." "Nur stille" "Die Strahlen ... Es siegte"

== Recordings ==
The first known recording of The Magic Flute's overture was issued around 1903, by the Victor Talking Machine Company and played by the Victor Grand Concert Band.

The first complete recording of The Magic Flute was of a live performance at the 1937 Salzburg Festival, with Arturo Toscanini conducting the Vienna Philharmonic and Vienna State Opera, though the recording was not officially issued until many years later. The first studio recording of the work, with Sir Thomas Beecham conducting the Berlin Philharmonic, was completed in 1938. Both of these historic recordings have been reissued on LP and compact disc. Since then there have been many recordings, in both audio and video formats.

== See also ==
- Works inspired by The Magic Flute

== Notes and references ==
=== Sources ===
- Abert, Hermann (2007). Cliff Eisen (ed.). W. A. Mozart. Translated by Stewart Spencer. New Haven: Yale University Press. ISBN 978-0300072235; with supplementary footnotes by Cliff Eisen.
- Anon. (25 October 2014). "Die Zauberflöte" (PDF) (Program notes). Metropolitan Opera. p. 41. Archived from the original (PDF) on 25 November 2015.
- Boldrey, Richard (1994). Guide to Operatic Roles & Arias. Dallas: Pst Inc. ISBN 978-1877761645.
- Branscombe, Peter (1991). Die Zauberflöte. New York: Cambridge University Press. ISBN 9780521319164.
- Deutsch, Otto Erich (1966) [1965]. Mozart: a documentary biography. Translated by Eric Blom, Peter Branscombe and Jeremy Noble (2nd ed.). Stanford, California: Stanford University Press. ISBN 9780804702331.
- Heartz, Daniel (2009). Mozart, Haydn and early Beethoven, 1781–1802. New York: W. W. Norton. ISBN 978-0-393-06634-0.
- Rosen, Charles (1997). The Classical Style: Haydn, Mozart, Beethoven. New York: W. W. Norton. ISBN 0-393-31712-9. OCLC 1029266214.
- Solomon, Maynard (1995). Mozart: A Life. New York: Harper Collins. ISBN 9780060190460.
