= Emanuel Schikaneder =

German actor and singer (1751–1812)

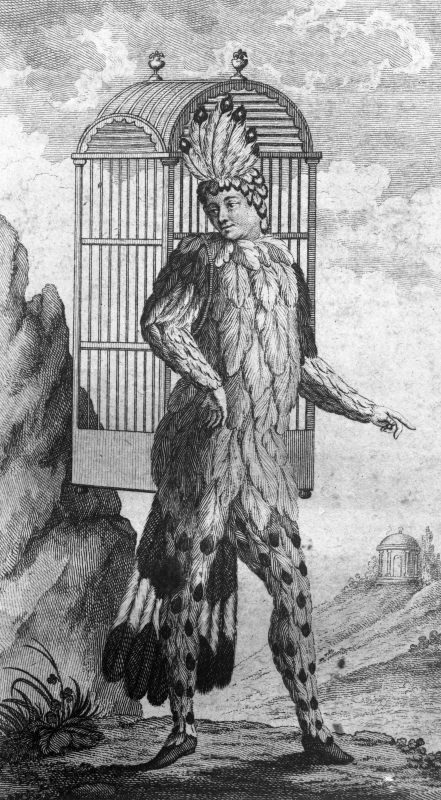
- Schikaneder playing the role of Papageno in Mozart's Die Zauberflöte. Engraving by Ignaz Alberti
- Born: 1 September 1751; Straubing, Electorate of Bavaria, Holy Roman Empire
- Died: 21 September 1812 (aged 61); Vienna, Austrian Empire
- Resting place: Gräberhain Währinger Park
- Occupations: Impresario; Dramatist; Actor
- Organizations: Theater an der Wien

Emanuel Schikaneder (born Johann Joseph Schickeneder; 1 September 1751 – 21 September 1812) was a German–Austrian impresario, dramatist, actor, singer, and composer. He wrote the libretto of Mozart's opera Die Zauberflöte and was the builder of the Theater an der Wien. Peter Branscombe called him "one of the most talented theatre men of his era". Aside from Mozart, he knew and worked with Salieri, Haydn and Beethoven.

== Early years ==
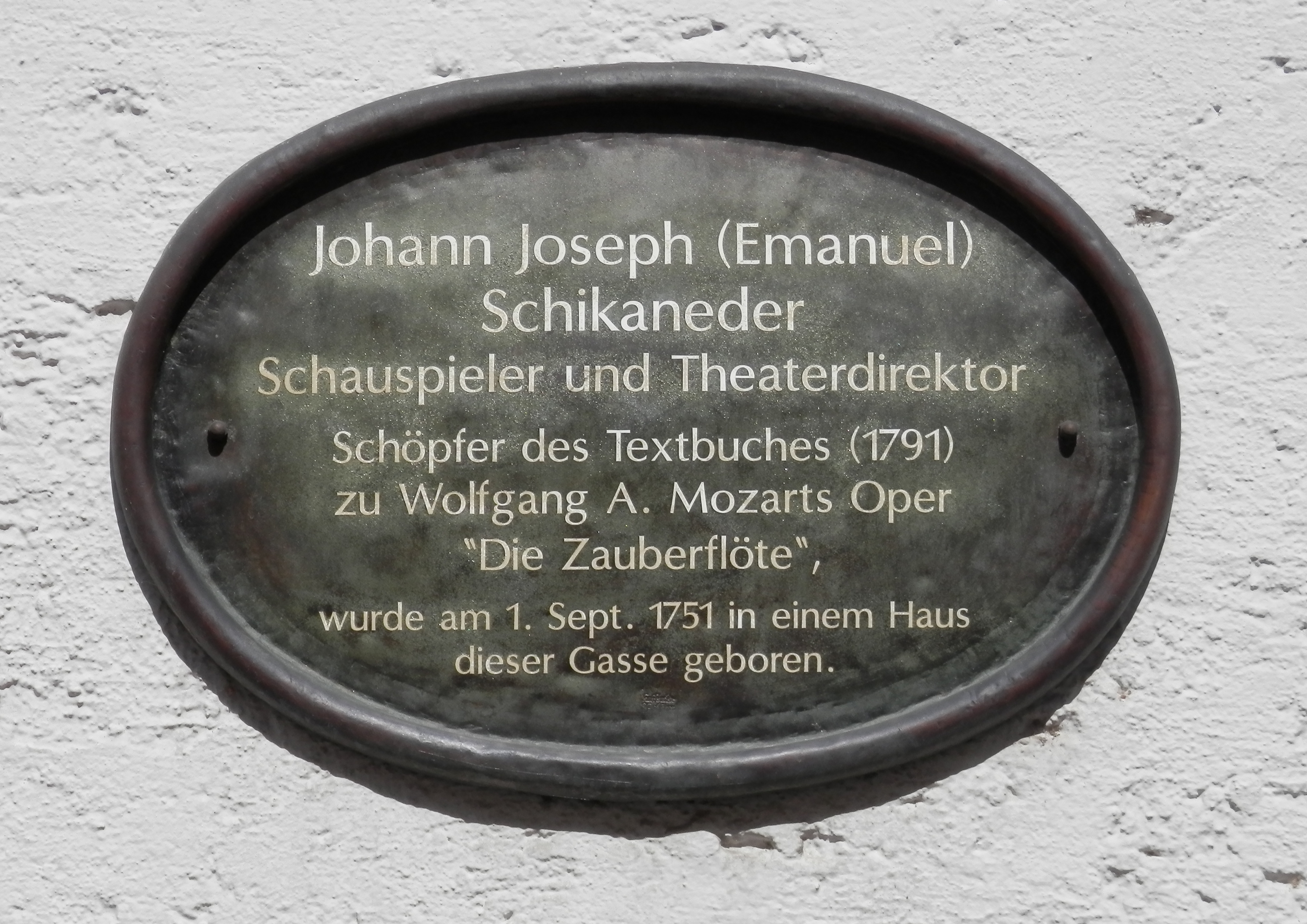
Schikaneder's birthplace (Straubing). Click on image for translation.

Schikaneder was born in Straubing in the Electorate of Bavaria in the Holy Roman Empire to Joseph Schickeneder and Juliana Schiessl. Both of his parents worked as domestic servants and were extremely poor. They had a total of four children: Urban (born 1746), Johann Joseph (died at age two), Emanuel (born 1751 and also originally named Johann Joseph), and Maria (born 1753). Schikaneder's father died shortly after Maria's birth, at which time his mother returned to Regensburg, making a living selling religious articles from a wooden shed adjacent to the local cathedral.

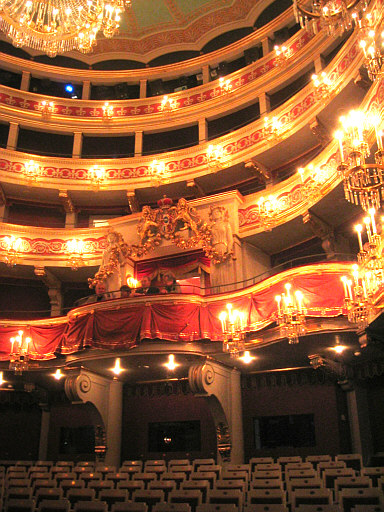
Auditorium of Regensburg Theatre

Schikaneder received his education at a Jesuit school in Regensburg as well as training in the local cathedral as a singer. As a young adult, he began to pursue his career in the theater, appearing with Andreas Schopf's theatrical troupe around 1773 and performing opera, farce, and Singspiel. Schikaneder danced at a court ballet in Innsbruck in 1774, and the following year his Singspiel Die Lyranten was debuted there. This was a great success and was performed frequently in the following years. Schikaneder was the librettist, composer, and principal singer, a versatility he would continue to exhibit throughout his career.

== Befriending the Mozarts ==
In the fall of 1780, the Schikaneder troupe made an extended stay in Salzburg, and at that time Schikaneder became a family friend of the Mozarts. The Mozart family at the time consisted of father Leopold, Nannerl, and Wolfgang. The Mozarts "rarely missed his shows" (Heartz), and invited Schikaneder to Sunday sessions of Bölzlschiessen (dart shooting), their favorite family sport.

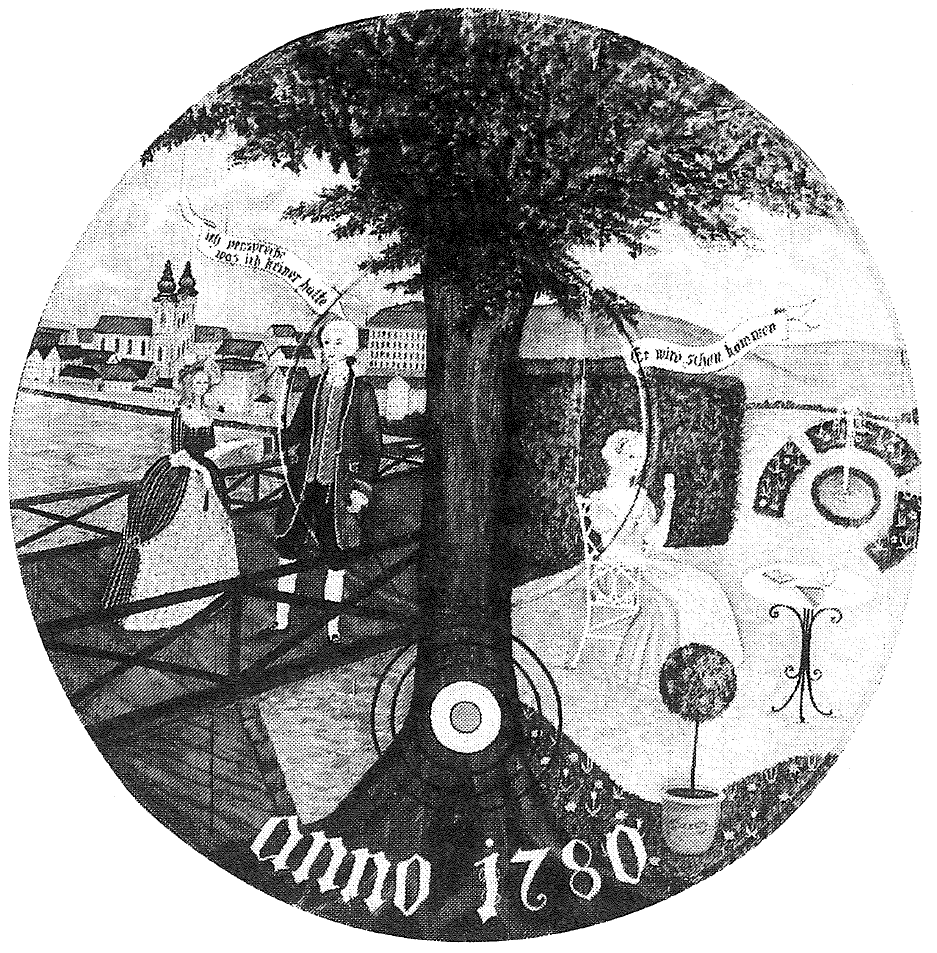
Modern reconstruction of the target for Bölzlschiessen, satirizing Schikaneder's notorious womanizing. Schikanederh is shown as saying "ich verspreche was ich keiner halte" (I promise what I cannot keep), while the young woman on the right is shown saying "Er wird schon kommen" (He will soon come to me).

As Mozart was about to depart Salzburg for the premiere in Munich of his opera Idomeneo, he promised before leaving to write "Wie grausam ist, o Liebe...Die neugeborne Ros' entzückt", a recitative and aria for Schikaneder. The composition was intended for Schikaneder's production of Die zwey schlaflosen Nächte by August Werthes.

== First stay in Vienna ==
From November 1784 to February 1785, Schikaneder collaborated with theater director Hubert Kumpf for a series of performances at the Kärntnertortheater in Vienna. He had been invited to do so by the Emperor Joseph II, who had seen him perform the previous year in Pressburg. The Vienna run was admired by critics and attracted large audiences, often including the Emperor and his court. Schikaneder and Kumpf opened their season with a revival of Mozart's Die Entführung aus dem Serail. Joseph Haydn's La fedeltà premiata was also performed by the troupe.

Works of spoken drama were of interest for their political content. The Austrian Empire at the time was governed (like most of Europe) by the system of hereditary aristocracy, which was falling under increasing criticism as the values of the Enlightenment spread. Schikaneder put on a successful comedy entitled Der Fremde which included a character named Baron Seltenreich ("seldom-rich") who was "a caricature of a scheming windbag of the Viennese aristocracy". Schikaneder and his colleague then stepped over the line, initiating a production of Beaumarchais' then-scandalous send-up of the aristocracy, The Marriage of Figaro. This production was canceled by the Emperor at the last minute.

In spite of the content and cancellation of the production, Joseph II brought Schikaneder over and he entered Imperial service from April 1785 through February 1786. During his service, he performed in the Austrian Nationaltheater at Burgtheater. During his debut he sang the role of Schwindel in Gluck's Singspiel Die Pilgrime von Mekka.

== Years at the Theater auf der Wieden ==
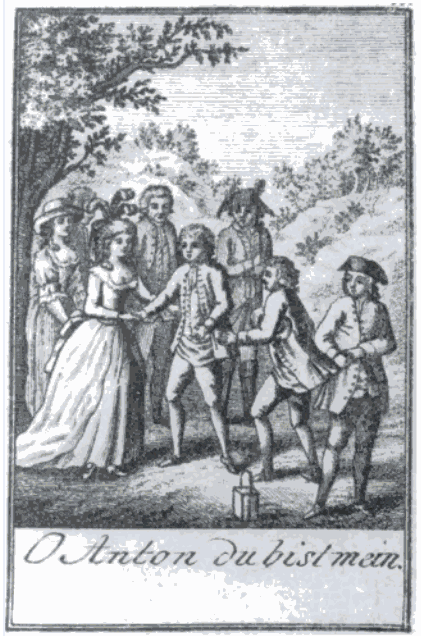
Circa 1791; Schikaneder's troupe performing "O Anton du bist mein" from the Singspiel Die zween Anton.

During Easter 1788, the troupe run by Johann Friedel and Eleonore Schikaneder had settled as the resident troupe at the Theater auf der Wieden, located in a suburb of Vienna. Friedel died on 31 March 1789, leaving his entire estate to Eleonore, and the theater was closed. Following this, Eleonore offered reconciliation to Schikaneder, who moved to Vienna in May to start a new company in the same theater in partnership with her. The new company was financed by Joseph von Bauernfeld, a Masonic brother of Mozart. With plans of an emphasis on opera, Schikaneder brought two singers with him from his old troupe, tenor Benedikt Schack and bass Franz Xaver Gerl. From his wife's company he retained soprano Josepha Hofer, actor Johann Joseph Nouseul, and Karl Ludwig Giesecke as librettist. New additions to the troupe included Anna Gottlieb and Jakob Haibel.

The new company was successful, and Die Entführung aus dem Serail again became part of the repertory. Several aspects of the company's work emerged that later came to be immortalized in Die Zauberflöte. A series of musical comedies starting with Der Dumme Gärtner aus dem Gebirge, oder Die zween Antons ("The Foolish Gardener from the Mountains, or The Two Antons"), premiered in July 1789. The comedy provided a vehicle for Schikaneder's comic stage persona. Another line of performances by the company involved fairy tale operas, starting with the 1789 premiere of Oberon, with music by Paul Wranitzky and a libretto that was a readaptation of Friederike Sophie Seyler's original libretto. This was followed by Der Stein der Weisen oder Die Zauberinsel in September 1790, a collaborative opera marked by the musical collaboration of Gerl, Schack, Schikaneder and Mozart.

In a review of a performance at the Theater auf der Wieden by a north German commentator in 1793, most contemporary reviews were positive, noting a high standard of musical performance. In his unpublished autobiography, Ignaz von Seyfried recalled performances of operas in the early 1790s by Mozart, Süßmayr, Hoffmeister etc., writing that they were performed with rare skill (ungemein artig). Seyfried describes Kapellmeister Henneberg conducting the orchestra from the "pianoforte ... like a General commanding an army of musicians!"

=== Die Zauberflöte ===
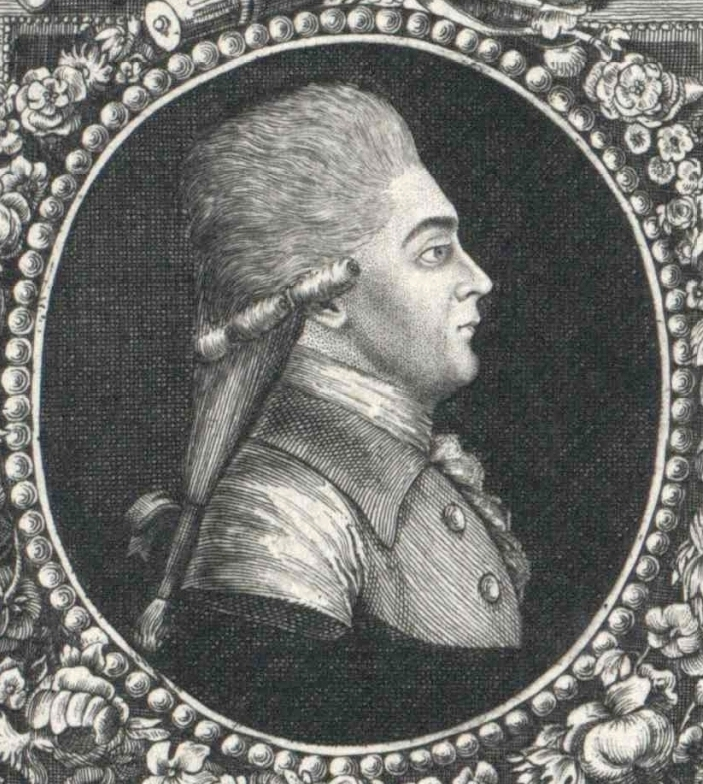
Schikaneder circa 1784

The series of fairy-tale operas at the Theater auf der Wieden culminated in the September 1791 premiere of Die Zauberflöte, with music by Mozart and libretto by Schikaneder. The opera incorporated a loose mixture of Masonic elements and traditional fairy-tale themes (see Libretto of The Magic Flute). Schikaneder took the role of Papageno—a character reflecting the Hanswurst tradition, and thus suited to his skills—at the premiere.

According to the dramatist Ignaz Franz Castelli, Schikaneder also may have given advice to Mozart concerning the musical setting of his libretto:

The late bass singer Sebastian Mayer told me that Mozart had originally written the duet where Papageno and Papagena first see each other quite differently from the way in which we now hear it. Both originally cried out "Papageno!", "Papagena!" a few times in amazement. But when Schikaneder heard this, he called down into the orchestra, "Hey, Mozart! That's no good, the music must express greater astonishment. They must both stare dumbly at each other, then Papageno must begin to stammer: 'Pa-papapa-pa-pa'; Papagena must repeat that until both of them finally get the whole name out. Mozart followed the advice, and in this form the duet always had to be repeated."

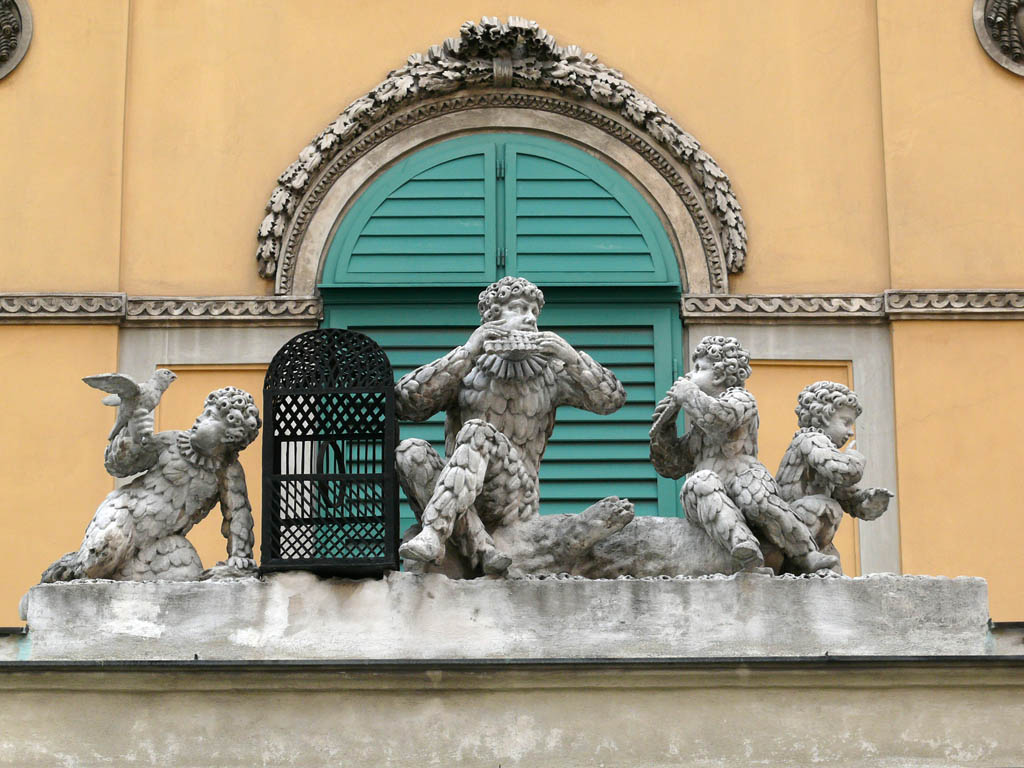
Papageno Gate – the former main entrance of the Theater an der Wien (1801). Schikaneder as Papageno with his siblings in Das Labyrinth.

Castelli adds that the March of the Priests which opens the second act was also a suggestion of Schikaneder's, added to the opera at the last minute by Mozart. These stories are not accepted as necessarily true by all musicologists.

Die Zauberflöte was a great success at its premiere, frequently selling out and receiving over a hundred performances at the Theater auf der Wieden during its first few months of performance. Schikaneder continued to produce the opera at intervals for the rest of his career in Vienna.

Mozart died only a few weeks after the premiere, on 5 December 1791. Schikaneder was distraught at the news and felt the loss sharply. He evidently put on a benefit performance of Die Zauberflöte for Mozart's widow Constanze, who at the time faced a difficult financial situation. When his troupe mounted a concert performance of Mozart's La clemenza di Tito in 1798, he wrote in the program:

Mozart's work is beyond all praise. One feels only too keenly, on hearing this or any other of his music, what the Art has lost in him.

=== Remaining years ===
Schikaneder's career continued in the same theater during the years that followed Die Zauberflöte. He continued to write works in which he played the main role and which achieved popular success. These included collaborations with other composers of the time: Der Spiegel von Arkadien with Mozart's assistant Franz Xaver Süssmayr, Der Tyroler Wastel with Mozart's posthumous brother-in-law Jakob Haibel, and a Zauberflöte sequel called Das Labyrinth, with Peter von Winter. A big box office draw during this time was a rhymed-verse comedy, Der travestierte Aeneas (The Travesty of Aeneas), a contribution of Giesecke.

During this period, Schikaneder would several times a year devote the theater to an Academie, or in modern terms, a classical music concert. Symphonies of Mozart and Haydn were performed, and a young Beethoven appeared as a piano soloist.

Schikaneder maintained in the repertory seven Mozart operas: Die Entführung aus dem Serail, Le nozze di Figaro, Der Schauspieldirektor, Don Giovanni, Così fan tutte, La clemenza di Tito, and Die Zauberflöte. The Italian operas were performed in German translation. As noted above, Schikaneder also produced La clemenza di Tito as a concert work.

Although many of the works performed were popular successes, the expenses of Schikaneder's elaborate productions were high, and the company gradually fell into debt. In 1798, Schikaneder's landlord learned that the debt had risen to 130,000 florins and canceled Schikaneder's lease. Schikaneder persuaded Bartholomäus Zitterbarth, a wealthy merchant, to become his partner and take on the debt. As a result, the company was saved.

== Theater an der Wien ==
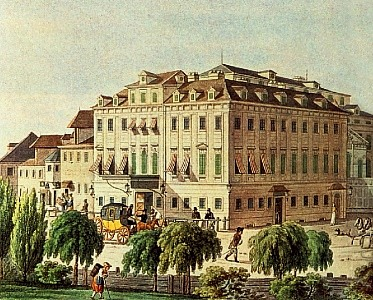
The Theater an der Wien as it appeared in 1815

Schikaneder and his new partner Zitterbarth planned together to construct a grand new theater for the company. Zitterbarth purchased the land for the new theater on the other side of the Wien River, in another suburb only a few hundred meters away from the Theater auf der Wieden. Schikaneder still had in his possession a document from the late Emperor Joseph II permitting him to construct a new theater. In 1800, he had an audience with the now-reigning Franz, which resulted in a renewal of the license—over the protests of Peter von Braun, who directed the Burgtheater. In retaliation, Braun mounted a new production of Die Zauberflöte at the Burgtheater, which did not mention Schikaneder as the author.

Construction of the new theater, which was named the Theater an der Wien, began in April 1800. It opened 13 June 1801 with a performance of the opera Alexander, to Schikaneder's own libretto with music by Franz Teyber. According to the New Grove, the Theater an der Wien was "the most lavishly equipped and one of the largest theatres of its age". There, Schikaneder continued his tradition of expensive and financially risky theatrical spectacle.

== Schikaneder and Beethoven ==
Ludwig van Beethoven had moved to Vienna in 1792 and gradually established a strong reputation as a composer and pianist. He performed in an Academie at the Theater auf der Wieden during its last years. In the spring of 1803, the first Academie at the new Theater an der Wien was devoted entirely to Beethoven's works: the first and second symphonies, the third piano concerto (with Beethoven as soloist), and the oratorio Christ on the Mount of Olives.

Schikaneder wanted Beethoven to compose an opera for him. After offering Beethoven an apartment to live in inside the theater building, he also offered his libretto, Vestas Feuer. Beethoven, however, found Vestas Feuer unsuited to his needs. He did, however, set the opening scene, part of which ultimately became the duet "O namenlose Freude" from his 1804 opera Fidelio. Beethoven continued to live in the Theater an der Wien for a while as he switched his efforts to Fidelio.

== Decline and demise ==
Fidelio premiered in the Theater an der Wien, but not under Schikaneder's direction. By 1804, Schikaneder's career had taken a downward turn; his productions could not bring in enough customers to cover their cost. He sold the Theater an der Wien to a consortium of nobles and left Vienna for the provinces, working in Brno and Steyr. Following economic problems caused by war and an 1811 currency devaluation, Schikaneder lost most of his fortune. During a journey to Budapest in 1812 to take a new post, he became insane. He died impoverished in Vienna on 21 September 1812 at age 61.

== Family ==
Two of Schikaneder's relatives were also his professional associates:

- Urban Schikaneder (1746–1818), a bass, was Emanuel's older brother. He was born in Regensburg on 2 November 1746, and worked for a number of years in his brother's troupe, both as a singer and in helping to administer the group. At the premiere of Die Zauberflöte, he sang the role of the First Priest.
- Anna Schikaneder (1767–1862) also called "Nanny" or "Nanette", was his brother Urban's daughter. At age 24 she sang the role of the First Boy in Die Zauberflöte.

Schikaneder's illegitimate son Franz Schikaneder (1802–1877) was a blacksmith in the service of Emperor Ferdinand I of Austria.

== Works ==
Works by Schikaneder include 56 libretti and 45 spoken-language plays, among them:

=== Libretti ===
- Die Lyranten oder das lustige Elend (The Minstrels, or Merry Misery). Operetta, music by Schikaneder, Innsbruck, ca. 1775.
- Das Urianische Schloss (The Urian Castle) Singspiel, music by Schikander, Salzburg, 1786.
- Der dumme Gärtner aus dem Gebirge oder die zween Anton (The Silly Gardener from the Hills, or The Two Antons). Comic opera, music by Benedikt Schack and Franz Xaver Gerl. Vienna, 1789.
  - Five sequels to the latter work, including
    - Was macht der Anton im Winter? (What does Anton do in Winter?) Music by Benedikt Schack and Franz Xaver Gerl. Vienna, 1790.
    - Anton bei Hofe, oder Das Namensfest (Anton at Court, or The Name-Day) (Vienna, 4 June 1791). Mozart heard the work on 6 June.
- Der Stein der Weisen (The Philosopher's Stone or the Magic Isle). Heroic-comic opera, Music by Benedikt Schack, Johann Baptist Henneberg, Franz Xaver Gerl, Emanuel Schikaneder, and Wolfgang Amadeus Mozart. Vienna 11 September 1790.
- Der Fall ist noch weit seltner (opera libretto, Vienna 1790; music by Benedikt Schack)
- Die Zauberflöte (opera libretto, Vienna 1791)
- Der Spiegel von Arkadien (The Mirror of Arcadia). Grand heroic-comic opera, music by Franz Xaver Süssmayr. Vienna, 1794.
- Babylons Pyramiden (opera libretto)
- Das Labyrinth oder Der Kampf mit den Elementen. Der Zauberflöte zweyter Theil, Heroic-comic opera, Music by Peter von Winter Vienna, 1798.
- Der Tiroler Wastel (opera libretto)
- Vestas Feuer (opera libretto, Vienna 1803)

=== Plays ===
- Das abgebrannte Haus
- Der Fleischhauer von Odenburg
- Die Fiaker in Wien

== In fiction ==
In 2016, the musical Schikaneder by Stephen Schwartz and Christian Stuppeck and directed by Trevor Nunn, based on the premise that Die Zauberflöte sprang from Schikaneder's tumultuous relationship with Eleonore, debuted at the Raimund Theater.
