= Beethoven and Mozart =

Relationship between Ludwig van Beethoven and Wolfgang Amadeus Mozart

Wolfgang Amadeus Mozart (1756–1791) had a powerful influence on the works of Ludwig van Beethoven (1770–1827). Beethoven held Mozart in high regard. Some of his music recalls Mozart's; he composed several variations on Mozart's themes and he modeled a number of his compositions on those of the older composer. Whether the two men ever actually met remains a matter of speculation among scholars.

== Beethoven's years in Bonn ==
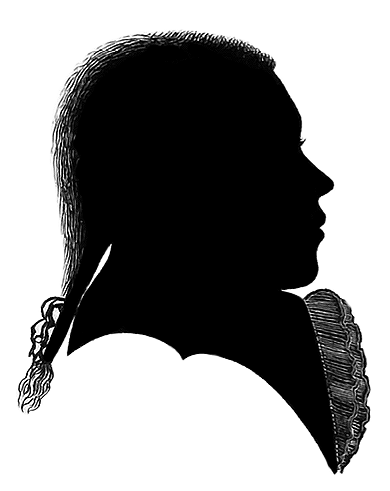
Silhouette image made of Beethoven when he was sixteen. He wears the uniform and wig suited to his employment as a court musician in Bonn.

Beethoven was born in Bonn in 1770, about 14 years after Mozart (born Salzburg, 1756). In 1781, during Beethoven's childhood, Mozart had moved from Salzburg to Vienna, the Austrian imperial capital, to pursue his career. While Bonn was politically and culturally affiliated to Vienna, it was geographically even more remote than Salzburg, lying around 900 km distant on the opposite side of German-speaking Europe.

During his youth and musical training in Bonn, Beethoven had extensive, intimate exposure to Mozart's music. He played Mozart piano concertos with the Bonn court orchestra and performed (playing viola) in Mozart's operas. Lewis Lockwood writes, "Just as Mozart had once told his father that he was 'soaked in music', so Beethoven was soaked in Mozart." In Beethoven's early efforts to compose, he was so strongly inspired by Mozart that once he worried that he had plagiarized him by mistake. Lockwood writes:

On a sketch leaf from about October 1790 Beethoven wrote down a brief C-minor passage in 6/8 meter, in two-staff piano score, and then wrote down these words, between the staves, about the little phrase: 'This entire passage has been stolen from the Mozart Symphony in C, where the Andante in six-eight from the ...' (he breaks off here). Then Beethoven writes the passage again just below and a little differently, on the same sketch page, and signs it 'Beethoven himself'. The passage he thought he was quoting cannot be traced to any Mozart symphony that we know.

== Beethoven's Vienna visit ==
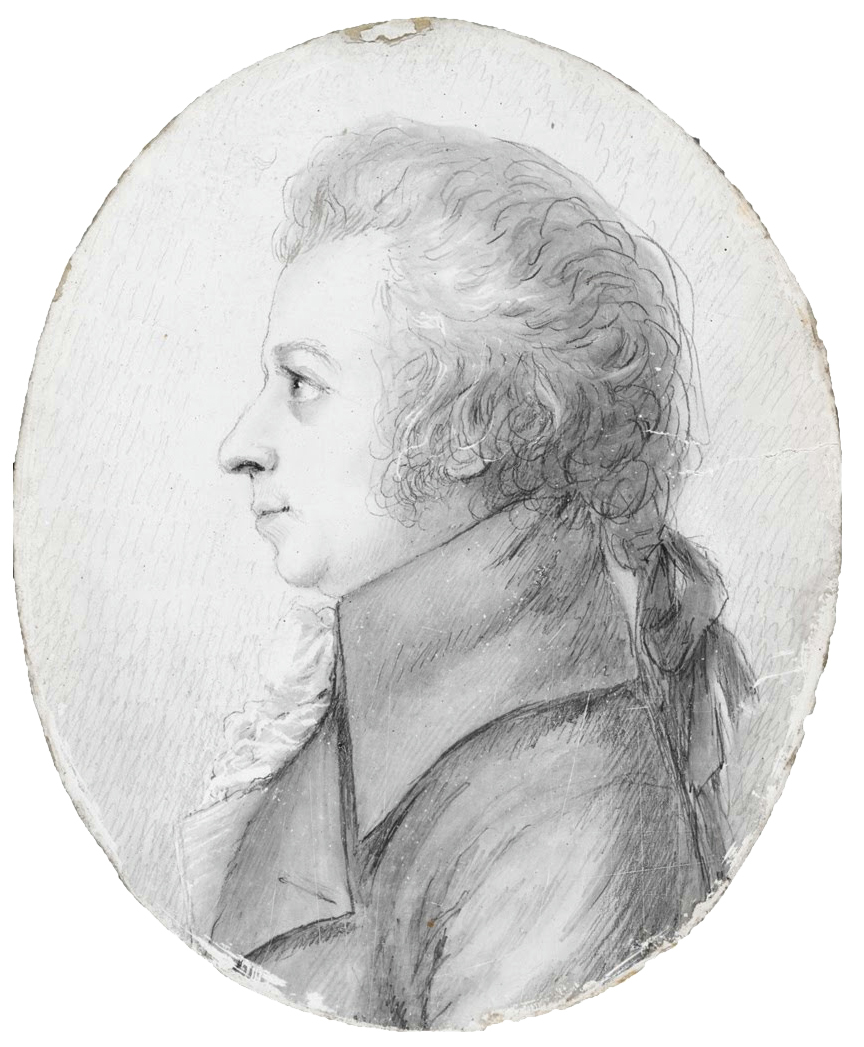
Drawing of Mozart in silverpoint, made by Doris Stock in April 1789

The evidence for Beethoven's travel dates were long obscure, but evidence from the publication Regensburgische Diarium (which recorded when individual people were arriving in Regensburg) is now taken to show that Beethoven must have arrived in Vienna in January 1787 and departed in March or April, remaining in the city about 10 1/2 weeks. Beethoven's return to Bonn was prompted at least in part by his mother's medical condition (she died of tuberculosis in July of that year). Beethoven's father was nearly incapacitated by alcoholism, and Beethoven had two younger brothers, so it was believed the composer may have been needed at home to support his family.

Written documentation of Beethoven's initial visit to Vienna is sparse; the two composers could conceivably have met. Haberl's dates imply a period of about six weeks when this could have occurred (Mozart was in Prague for part of early 1787).

The 19th-century biographer Otto Jahn gave an anecdote claiming that Beethoven had improvised before Mozart, and that the latter had been impressed. Jahn gives no evidence of this, mentioning only that "it was communicated to me in Vienna on good authority". A contemporary of Beethoven's, Ignaz von Seyfried, describes his encounter with Mozart as follows (although Seyfried places the visit in 1790):

Beethoven made a short stay at Vienna, in the year 1790, whither he had gone for the sake of hearing Mozart, to whom he had letters of introduction. Beethoven improvised before Mozart, who listened with some indifference, believing it to be a piece learned by heart. Beethoven then demanded, with his characteristic ambition, a given theme to work out; Mozart, with a skeptical smile, gave him at once a chromatic motivo for a fugue, in which, al rovescio, the countersubject for a double fugue lay concealed. Beethoven was not intimidated, and worked out the subject, the secret intention of which he immediately perceived, at great length and with such remarkable originality and power that Mozart's attention was riveted, and his wonder so excited that he stepped softly into the adjoining room where some friends were assembled, and whispered to them with sparkling eyes: "Don't lose sight of this young man, he will one day tell you some things that will surprise you!"

Contemporary scholarship is, however, somewhat skeptical of this story. The New Grove Dictionary of Music and Musicians does not mention it; its account of the visit is as follows:

In the spring of 1787 Beethoven visited Vienna. In the absence of documents, much remains uncertain about the precise aims of the journey and the extent to which they were realized; but there seems little doubt that he met Mozart and perhaps had a few lessons from him.

Some historians, however, are skeptical that Mozart and Beethoven met at all.

Maynard Solomon, who has written biographies of both Mozart and Beethoven, does not mention Jahn's tale, and even puts forward the possibility that Mozart might have given Beethoven an audition and then rejected him:

In Bonn, Beethoven was being groomed to be Mozart's successor by [a group of influential nobles], who sent him to Vienna ... to advance that purpose. The sixteen-year-old Beethoven, however, was not yet ready to be on his own. At his father's urging, the young virtuoso left Vienna ... and returned home in a state of despondency over his mother's consumptive condition – and perhaps over a rejection by Mozart, who was preoccupied with his own affairs, including his worrisome financial condition, and may not have been able seriously to consider taking on another pupil, even one of great talent and backed by eminent patrons.

Solomon goes on to enumerate other matters that kept Mozart preoccupied at the time: his father's declining health, a visit to Prague, the beginnings of work on Don Giovanni, and the writing of "a vast amount of other music". Moreover, Mozart already had a pupil living in his home, the nine-year-old Johann Nepomuk Hummel.

While it cannot be determined whether Beethoven actually met Mozart, it is more probable that he heard Mozart play. Beethoven's student Carl Czerny told Otto Jahn that Beethoven had told him that Mozart (whom Beethoven could only have heard during his 1787 visit to Vienna) "had a fine but choppy [German zerhacktes] way of playing, no ligato."

Regardless of whether Beethoven met Mozart in Vienna, his 1787 visit there seems to have been the start of an unhappy time for him. The Grove Dictionary notes that his "first surviving letter, to a member of a family in Augsburg that had befriended him on his way [to Vienna], describes the melancholy events of that summer and hints at ... ill-health [and] depression.

== Shared experiences ==
Beethoven eventually returned to Vienna permanently in 1792, the year after Mozart's death. His early years in Vienna included many experiences similar to Mozart's own in the preceding years, and he became closely acquainted with some of Mozart's associates. Like Mozart, Beethoven early established a strong reputation as a keyboard performer, was mentored by Joseph Haydn, and was given patronage by Countess Maria Wilhelmine Thun. Beethoven was also given patronage by Baron van Swieten, in whose home he played the works of Baroque masters, just as Mozart had done. Like Mozart, Beethoven traveled (in 1796) to Prague, Dresden, Leipzig, and Berlin in the company of Prince Lichnowsky. On the Prague phase of his journey, Beethoven composed an extended concert aria for the noted soprano Josepha Duschek, as Mozart had done on his visit in 1789. By the early 19th century Beethoven was a focus of Emanuel Schikaneder's attention; the impresario sponsored the sketch phases of Beethoven's intended opera Vestas Feuer, just as he had been the impetus for Mozart's The Magic Flute. (Beethoven eventually abandoned Vestas Feuer in favor of Fidelio.)

== Influence of Mozart on Beethoven ==
Even after his death, Mozart's influence was apparent in the works of Beethoven. For example, Beethoven copied a passage from Mozart's 40th Symphony into the sketchbook he was using when he composed his Fifth Symphony, the third movement of which opens with a theme similar to one from the Mozart. Charles Rosen sees Mozart's C minor Piano Concerto, K. 491, as a model for Beethoven's 3rd Piano Concerto in the same key, the Quintet for Piano and Winds, K. 452, for Beethoven's quintet for the same instruments, Op. 16, and the A major String Quartet, K. 464, for Beethoven's A major String Quartet Op. 18 No. 5. Robert Marshall sees Mozart's Piano Sonata No. 14 in C minor, K. 457, as the model for Beethoven's Pathétique Sonata, Op. 13, in the same key.

Beethoven wrote cadenzas (WoO 58) to the first and third movements of Mozart's D minor piano concerto, K. 466, and four sets of variations on themes by Mozart:

- on "Se vuol ballare" from The Marriage of Figaro, for piano and violin, WoO 40 (1792–93);
- on "Là ci darem la mano" from Don Giovanni, for two oboes and cor anglais, WoO 28 (?1795);
- on "Ein Mädchen oder Weibchen" from The Magic Flute, for piano and cello, Op. 66 (?1795);
- on "Bei Männern welche Liebe fühlen" from the same opera, for piano and cello, WoO 46 (1801).

Quite late in his career Beethoven paid homage to Mozart by making a quotation from Don Giovanni (the opening notes of Leporello's aria 'Notte e giorno faticar') the basis of the 22nd of the Diabelli Variations.
