= Thaddäus Weigl =

Thaddäus Weigl (8 April 1776 – 10 February 1844) was an Austrian composer and music publisher.

== Life ==
He was born in Vienna, son of Joseph Franz Weigl, a cellist in the Vienna Court Theatre, and younger brother of the composer Joseph Weigl. He studied music with Johann Georg Albrechtsberger, who had taught his brother. He went on to study philosophy and law, and meanwhile pursued his interest in composing. A cantata dedicated to his philosophy teacher Franz Samuel Karpe was performed, and he was encouraged by its success. A comic opera Die Marionettenbude oder der Jahrmarkt zu Grünwalde, and an opera Idoli, were staged in the Theater in der Leopoldstadt, and were well received.

In 1795 Peter von Braun, manager of the Court Theatre, founded the theatre's music publishing firm Hoftheater-Musikverlag, and he entrusted Weigl with the work of making piano transcriptions of the operas and ballets that were performed at the theatre. In 1796 Weigl made extensive business trips for von Braun, to advertise the publishing house. He was afterwards appointed Court Theatre Composer, and subsequently wrote many ballets. He also organized the theatre's archives, which had been in a state of disorder.

In 1801 he established his own music publishing house. He published piano arrangements of operas, works of his brother Joseph, and other living Viennese composers, and songs by Franz Schubert: his ops. 57, 58, 88, 95, and 130.

In 1803, on the death of Franz Xaver Süssmayr, he was appointed assistant conductor at the Court Theatre, where his brother Joseph was chief conductor, but after his last ballet Bacchus und Ariadne was produced in December 1803 he devoted himself entirely to his music publishing business. In 1826 he transferred the business to his son Peter; the company was dissolved in 1832, and the assets were acquired by Diabelli, Artaria and Maximilian Joseph Leidesdorf.
