= As I was going by Charing Cross =

English language nursery rhyme

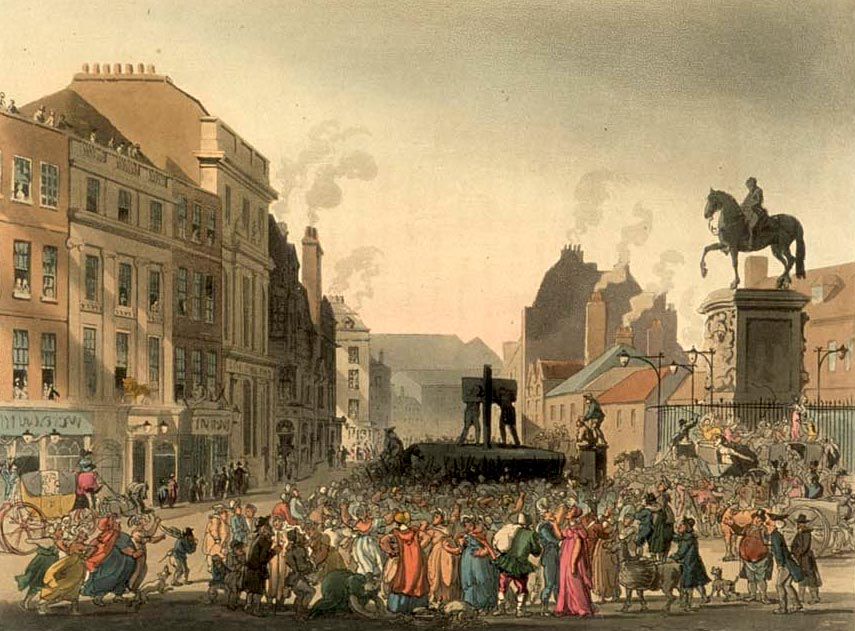
- Charing Cross with the statue of Charles I to the right

Nursery rhyme
- Published: 1840s
- Songwriter(s): Traditional (Unknown)

"As I was going by Charing Cross" (sometimes referred to as "As I was going to Charing Cross"), is an English language nursery rhyme. The rhyme was first recorded in the 1840s, but it may have older origins in street cries and verse of the seventeenth century. It refers to the equestrian statue of King Charles I in Charing Cross, London, and may allude to his death or be a puritan satire on royalist reactions to his execution. It was not recorded in its modern form until the mid-nineteenth century. It has a Roud Folk Song Index number of 20564.

== Lyrics ==
Modern versions include:

As I was going by Charing Cross,
I saw a black man upon a black horse;
They told me it was King Charles the First-
Oh dear, my heart was ready to burst!

The Roud Folk Song Index, which catalogues folk songs and their variations by number, classifies the song as 20564.

== Origin ==
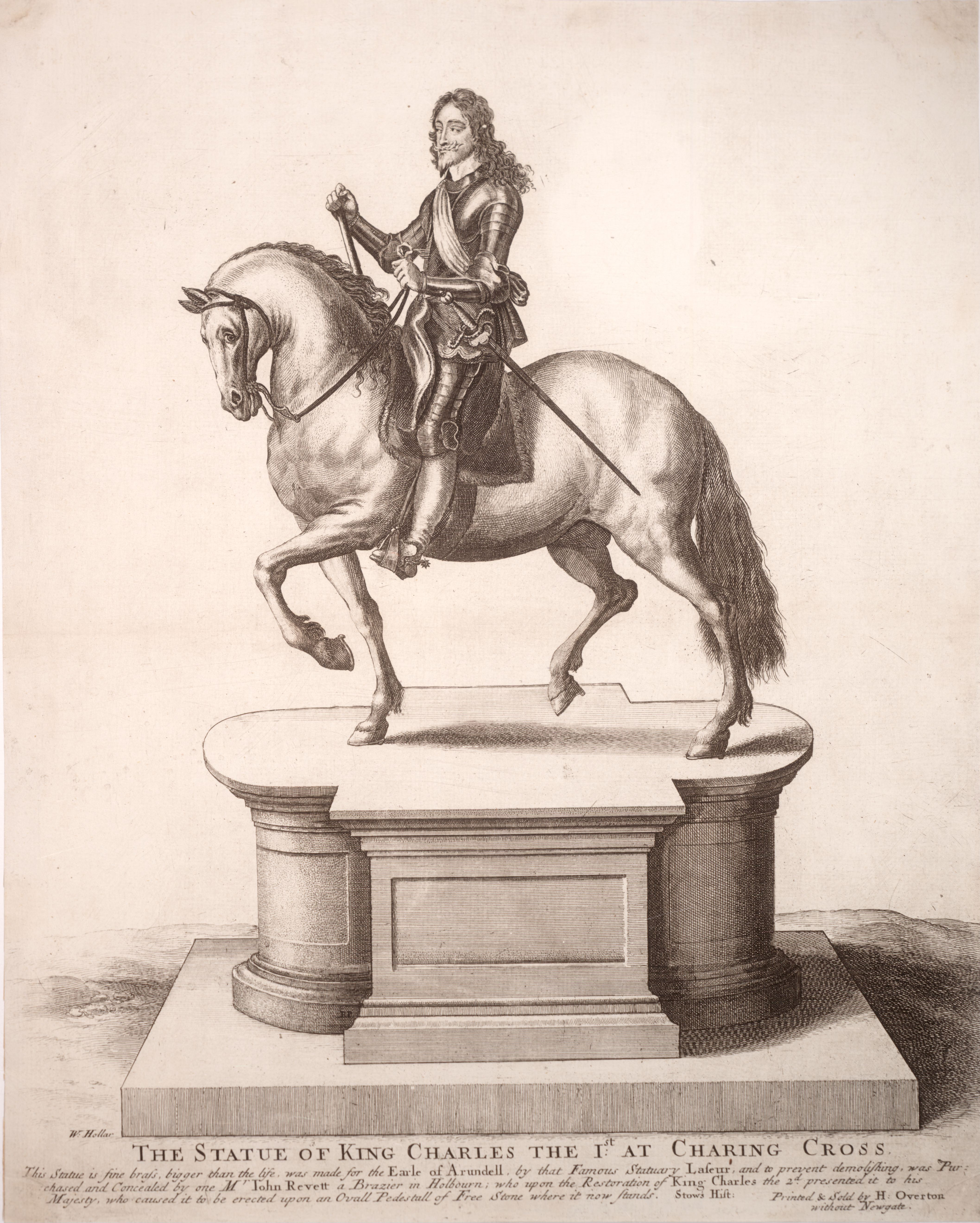
Wenceslas Hollar's engraving of the statue

The rhyme is thought to refer to the equestrian statue of Charles I (r. 1625–49), which was erected after the Restoration in 1660 and was moved in 1675 to the site of the old Charing Cross in central London. The tarnished bronze statue is largely dark in colour, but the "black" may refer to the king's hair colour.

The last line may refer to the reaction of the crowd when he was beheaded, or it may be a puritan satire on royalist reactions to the event. The rhyme may also have been produced out of a combination of existing couplets. A traditional London street cry was:

I cry my matches at Charing Cross,
Where sits a black man on a black horse.

or

I cry my matches by old Charing-Cross,
Where sitteth King Charles upon a black horse.

A note of a ballad in a seventeenth-century manuscript at Oxford contains the lines:

But because I cood not a vine Charlles the furste
By my toth my hart was readdy to burst

The first part was printed as a children's rhyme in a variation of the more famous "Ride a Cock Horse" in Pretty Tales, published in 1808, with the lyrics:

Ride a Cock Horse,
To Charing Cross,
To see a black man,
Upon a black horse.

The modern version, which may combine elements of this rhyme with a reference to the execution of Charles I, was first collected and printed by James Orchard Halliwell in the 1840s.

== See also ==
- Street cries
