= Joseph Weigl =

Austrian composer and conductor (1766–1846)

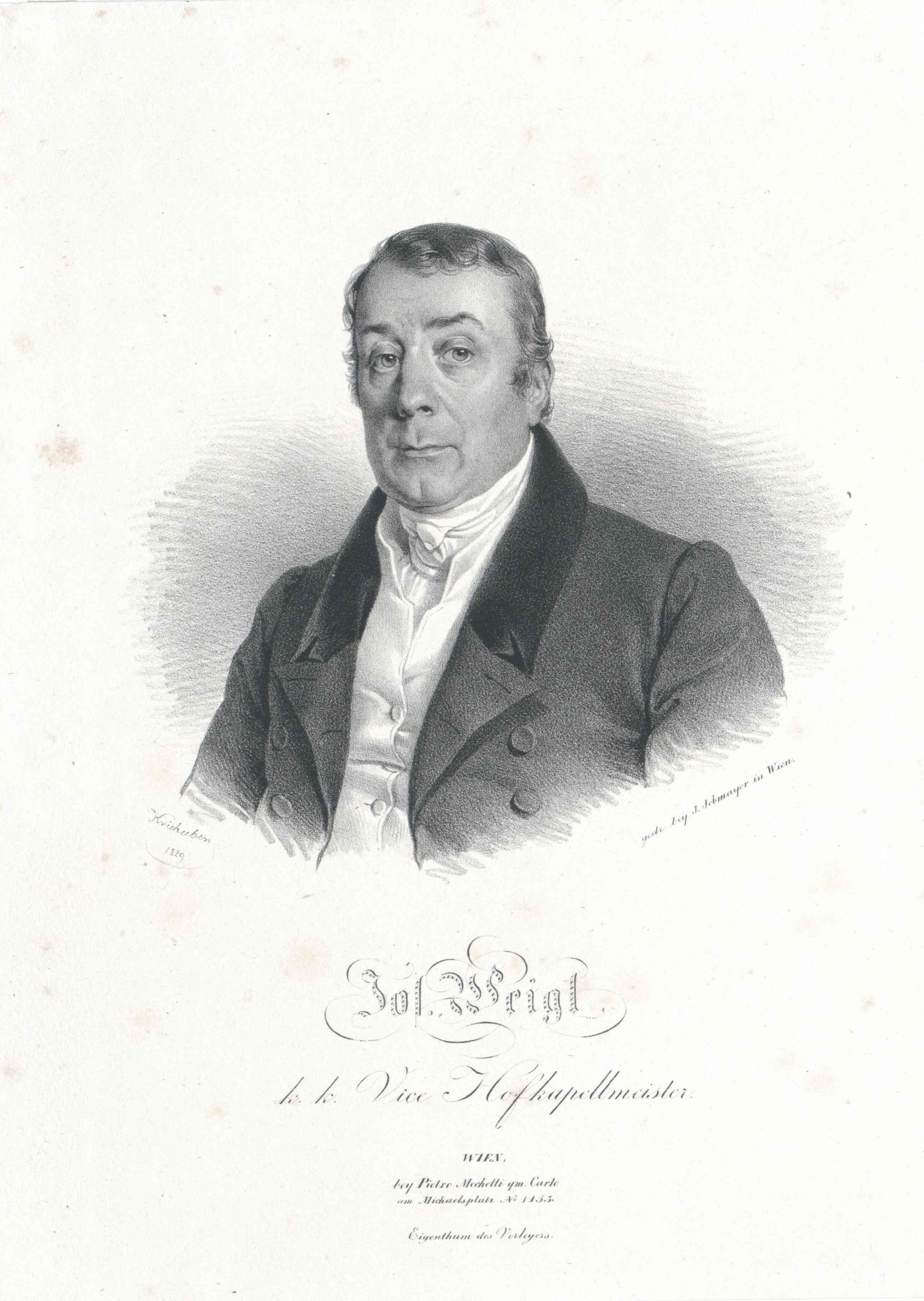
Joseph Weigl; Lithograph by Josef Kriehuber, 1829

Joseph Weigl (28 March 1766 – 3 February 1846) was an Austrian composer and conductor.

== Life ==
Wiegl was born in Eisenstadt, Austrian Empire. The son of Joseph Franz Weigl (1740–1820), the principal cellist in the orchestra of the Esterházy family, he studied music under Johann Georg Albrechtsberger, Wolfgang Amadeus Mozart and Antonio Salieri. He became Kapellmeister at the court theatre in Vienna in 1792, and from 1827 to 1838, was vice-Kapellmeister of the court.

Weigl composed a number of operas, both Italian and German and in various genres, although most of his late works are pieces of sacred music. His best known work was the opera Die Schweizerfamilie (1809). He also set Emanuel Schikaneder's libretto Vestas Feuer (1805), after his close friend Ludwig van Beethoven had composed a single scene and then abandoned it. Weigl died in Vienna in 1846.

His younger brother Thaddäus Weigl was a composer and music publisher.

== Operas ==
(first performed in Vienna, unless otherwise noted)

- Die unnütze Vorsicht oder Die betrogene Arglist, puppet opera in one act, (1783)
- Il pazzo per forza, opera in two acts (1788)
- La caffettiera bizzarra, komische Oper in three acts (1790)
- Der Strazzensammler oder Ein gutes Herz ziert jeden Stand, komische Oper in one act (1792)
- La principessa d’Amalfi, komische Oper in two acts (1794)
- Das Petermännchen, play with songs in eight scenes (1794)
- Giulietta e Pierotto, dramma giocoso in two acts (1794)
- I solitari, opera seria in three acts (1797)
- L'amor marinaro ossia Il corsaro, dramma giocoso in two acts (1797)
- Das Dorf im Gebirge, play with songs in two acts (1798)
- L'accademia del maestro Cisolfaut, opera in two acts (1798)
- L'uniforme, heroisch-komische Oper in three acts (Schönbrunn 1800), also as Die Uniform (1805)
- Vestas Feuer, heroische Oper in two acts (1805)
- Il principe invisibile, opera in five acts (Laxenburg 1806)
- Kaiser Hadrian, grosse Oper in three acts (1807)
- Adrian von Ostade, opera in one act (1807)
- Cleopatra, opera in two acts (Milan 1807)
- Il rivale di se stesso, opera in two acts (Milan 1808)
- Das Waisenhaus, Singspiel in two acts (1808)
- Die Schweizer Familie, lyrische Oper in three acts (1809)
- Der Einsiedler auf den Alpen, opera in one act (1810)
- Die Verwandlungen, operetta in one act (1810)
- Franziska von Foix, heroisch-komische Oper in three acts (1812)
- Der Bergsturz, Singspiel in three acts (1813)
- Die Jugend Peter des Großen, opera in three acts (1814)
- L’imboscata, opera in two acts (Milan 1815)
- Margaritta d’Anjou ossia L’orfana d’Inghilterra, melodramma eroicomico in two acts (1819)
- Die Nachtigall und der Rabe, opera in one act (1818)
- Daniel in der Löwengrube oder Baals Sturz, heroische Oper in three acts (1820)
- König Waldemar oder Die dänischen Fischer, Singspiel in one act (1821)
- Edmund und Caroline, opera in one act (1821)
- Die eiserne Pforte, grosse Oper in two acts (1823)
