= Joseph Franz Weigl =

Bavarian and Austrian cellist

Joseph Franz Weigl (19 May 1740 - 25 January 1820) was a Bavarian and Austrian cellist. He was the principal cellist in the orchestra of the Esterházy family, before moving to Vienna and the Burgtheater. He played under the directorship of Joseph Haydn, who also was godfather to the cellist's son, and it is thought that Haydn wrote his cello concerto in C major (Hob. VIIb/1) for him.

He was the father of Joseph Weigl (1766–1846), the composer and conductor, and Thaddäus Weigl (1776–1844), the composer and music publisher.
