= Equestrian statue of Charles I, Charing Cross =

Statue in London by Hubert Le Sueur

Charles I
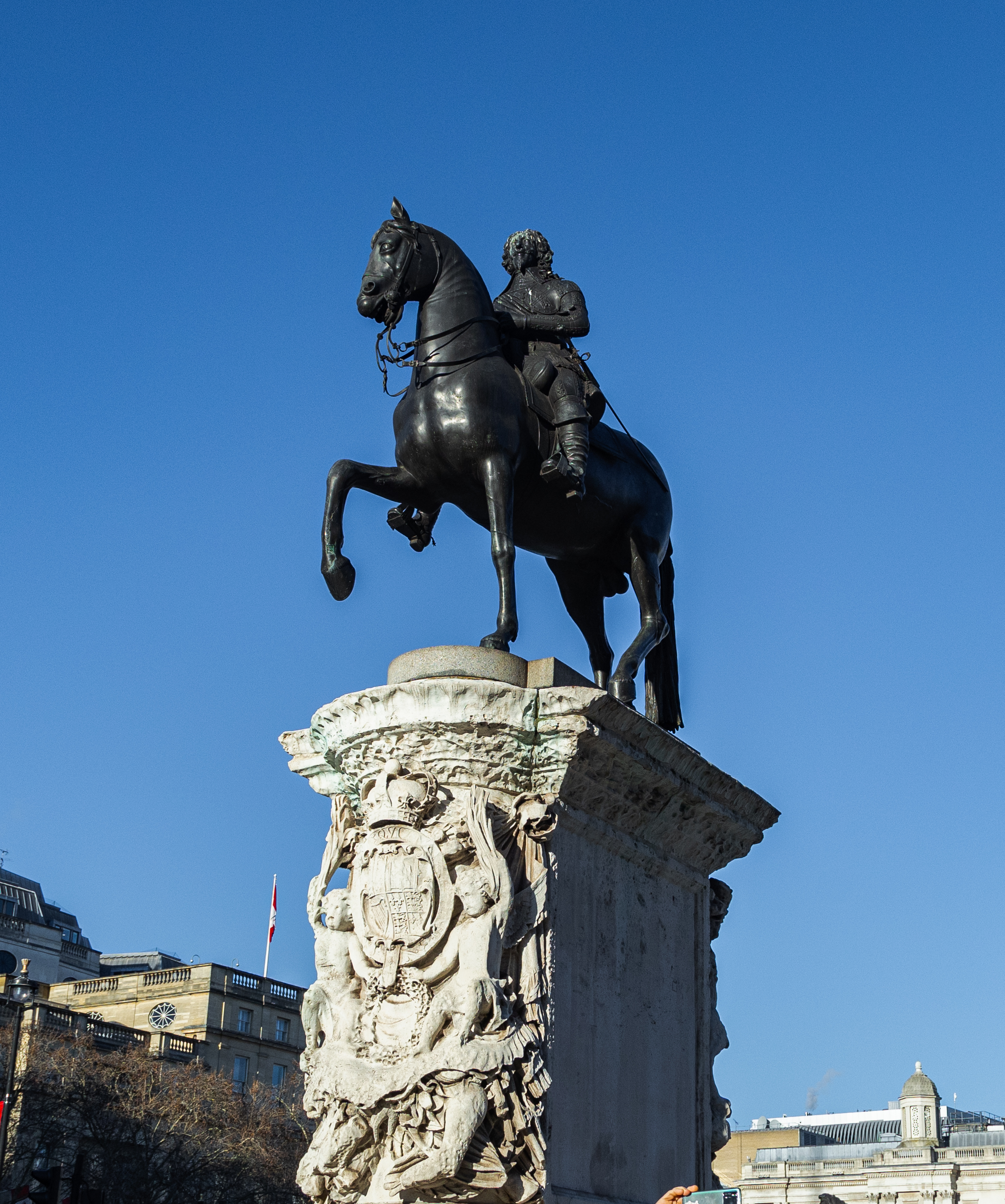
- Artist: Hubert Le Sueur
- Year: 1633; 393 years ago
- Type: Equestrian statue
- Medium: Bronze
- Subject: Charles I of England
- Location: London, WC2 United Kingdom; 51.50734°N 0.12768°W

Listed Building – Grade I
- Official name: Statue of Charles I
- Designated: 9 January 1970
- Reference no.: 1357291

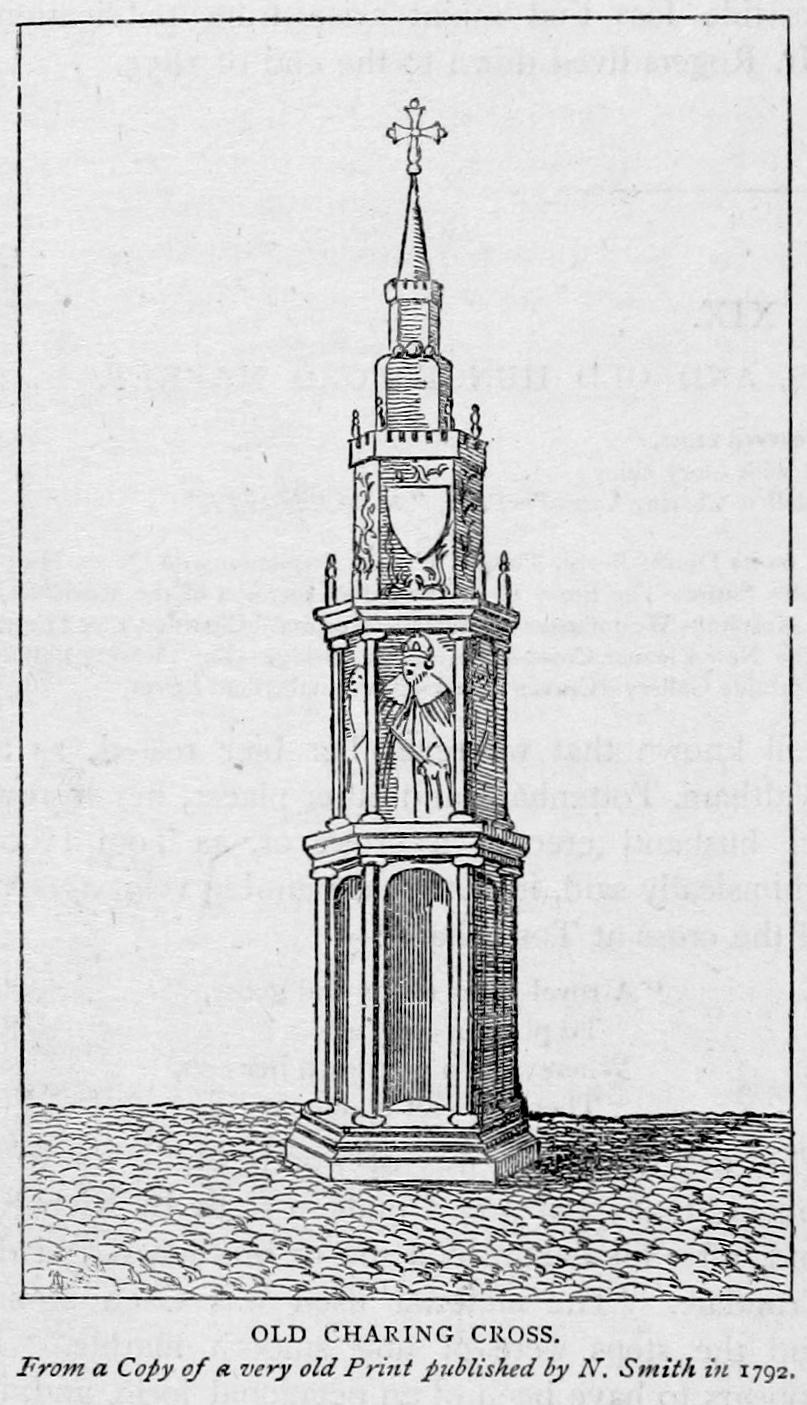
The statue stands in the spot formerly occupied by this Eleanor cross, the Charing Cross, commissioned 1291 and demolished 1647

The equestrian statue of Charles I at Charing Cross, London, England, is a work by the French sculptor Hubert Le Sueur, probably cast in 1633 during Charles’ lifetime. It is the oldest bronze statue in London and is considered the central point of the city.

Its location at Charing Cross is on the former site of the most elaborate of the Eleanor crosses erected by Edward I, which had stood for three and a half centuries until 1647. Charing Cross is used to define the centre of London and a plaque by the statue indicates that road signage distances to London are measured from this point. The statue faces down Whitehall towards Charles I's place of execution in 1649 at Banqueting House.

The first Renaissance-style equestrian statue in England, it was commissioned by Charles's Lord High Treasurer Richard Weston for the garden of his country house in Roehampton, Surrey (now in South London). Following the English Civil War the statue was sold to a metalsmith to be broken down, but he hid it until the Restoration. It was installed in its current, far more prominent location in the centre of London in 1675, and the elaborately carved plinth dates from that time.

== Description ==
The statue shows Charles I of England on horseback, with the king wearing a demi-suit of armour but without a helmet. Across the chest is a scarf tied into a bow on the right shoulder. The king is holding a baton in his right hand, and the reins of the horse in his left.

== History ==
The 24-year-old Charles succeeded his father in March 1625. Charles I dissolved parliament in 1629, and the statue was commissioned the following year in 1630.

The contract, in French with an English translation, is thought to have been drafted by the architect Balthazar Gerbier, who was then building Putney Park, Weston's country house in Roehampton. The statue was to be finished in 18 months (summer 1631), but its execution was delayed; the date 1633 inscribed on the horse's left forefoot is probably when the work was cast.

After the Parliamentary victory in the English Civil War, the statue was sold to John Rivet, a metalsmith in the Holborn area. Rivet received instructions from Parliament to break down the statue, but instead he hid it on his premises. He produced some broken pieces of brass as evidence that he had followed his instructions, and for some time sold brass-handled cutlery to both Royalists and Parliamentarians, which he claimed was made from the remains of the statue.

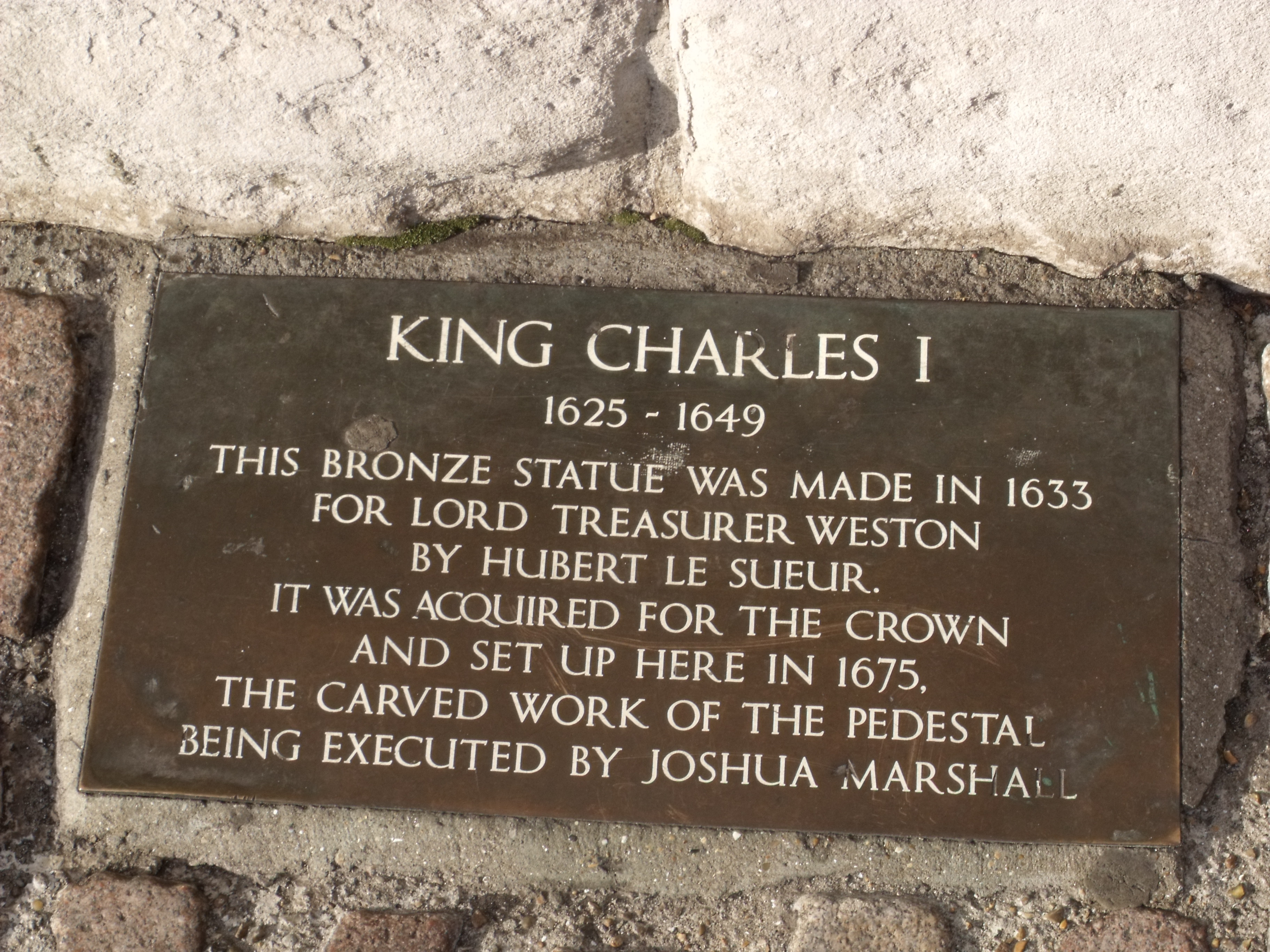
The plaque added to the base after the Second World War

After the Restoration, the statue was found by Jerome Weston, 2nd Earl of Portland and, following a complaint to the House of Lords, it was decreed "That the said John Rivett shall permit and suffer the Sheriff of London to serve a replevin upon the said Statue and Horse of Brass, that are now in his Custody." It was purchased by the King and in 1675 was placed in its current location. The pedestal itself is made of Portland stone with a carved coat of arms; the work was completed by Joshua Marshall, who was mason to Charles II.

On 28 October 1844, during the visit of Queen Victoria to open the Royal Exchange, the sword and the badge of the Order of the Garter were stolen. During the Second World War, the statue was removed by the Ministry of Works for protection. It was stored at Mentmore Park, Leighton Buzzard. Before being returned to its plinth in Whitehall, the Ministry carried out some repairs on the statue, including adding a replacement sword and the badge of the Order of the Garter. Additionally, a bronze tablet was added to the base of the plinth, explaining the addition of the replacement items.

In late 1892, the Legitimist Jacobite League of Great Britain and Ireland, led by Herbert Vivian, applied to the government for permission to lay wreaths at the statue, on the anniversary of Charles I's execution. Permission was refused by Prime Minister Gladstone, and George Shaw-Lefevre, Vivian's one-time travelling companion and now the First Commissioner of Works, enforced the order. The League attempted to lay their wreaths anyway on 30 January 1893. Police were dispatched to stop the League and after a confrontation, Vivian and other League members were allowed to complete their ceremony. Press coverage generally mocked the League for their actions.

In 1977, the plinth was cleaned for the first time in three centuries. The work was conducted by the Department of the Environment and the department of conservation at the Victoria and Albert Museum.

== See also ==
- "As I was going by Charing Cross"
