= Street cries =

Song, rhyme, or patter used by street vendors

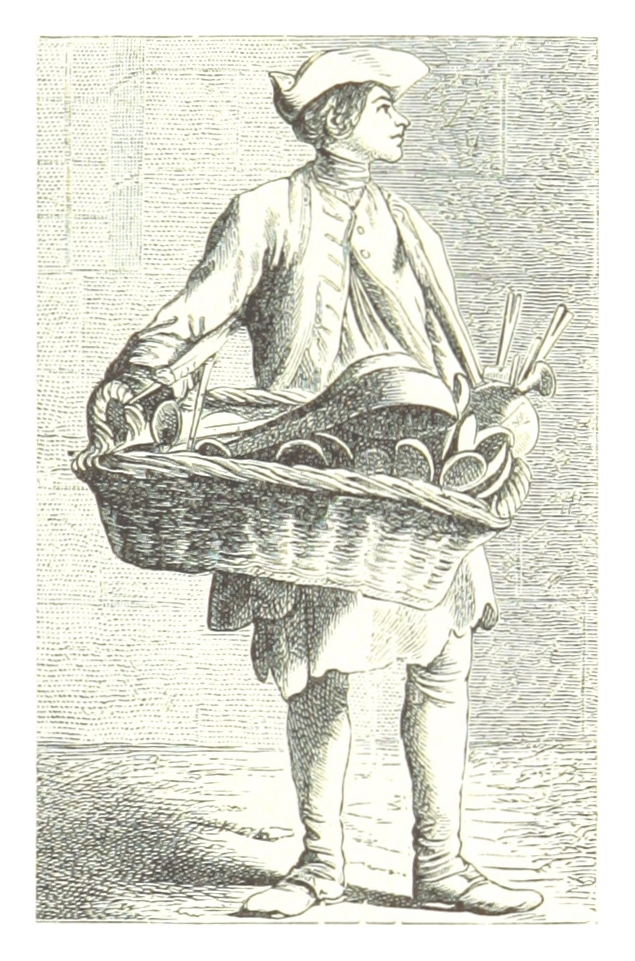
"Buy my Larders", the cry of a Parisian street vendor, engraving by Fournel from Les Cris de Paris, types et physionomies d'autrefois, 19th century

Street cries are the short lyrical calls of merchants hawking their products and services in open-air markets. The custom of hawking led many vendors to create custom melodic phrases to attract attention. At a time when a large proportion of the population were illiterate, the cries of street vendors and town criers provided the public with important messages, whether those messages were commercial in nature or of more general public interest. Street cries were part of the aural fabric of street life from antiquity.

Street cries have been known since antiquity and possibly earlier. During the 18th and 19th century, as urban populations grew, the street cries of major urban centers became one of the distinctive features of city life. Street cries became popular subject matter for poets, musicians, artists and writers of the period. Many of these street cries were catalogued in large collections or incorporated into larger musical works, preserving them from oblivion.

== History ==
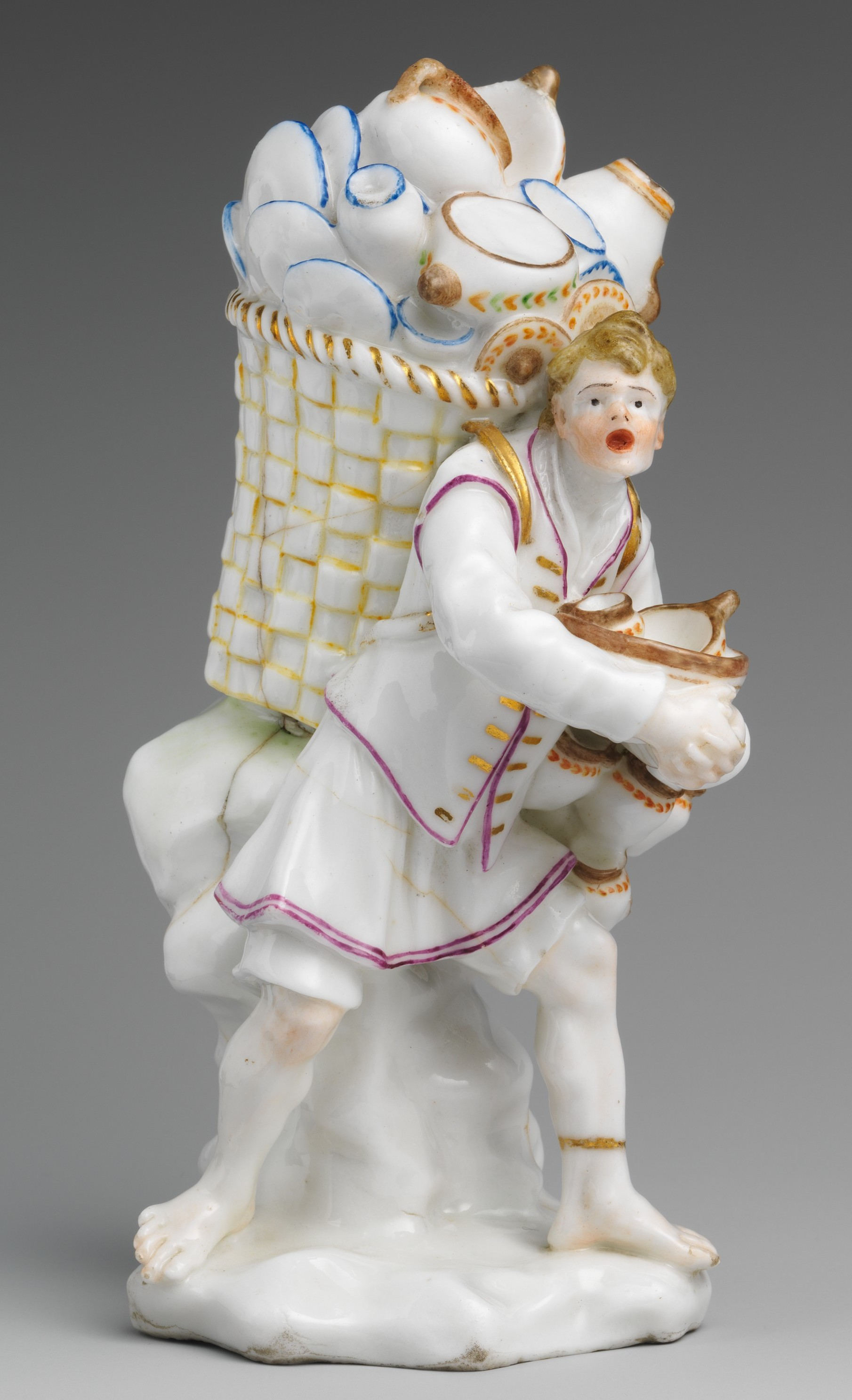
Pottery seller, from a series of the "Cries of Naples" in Capodimonte porcelain, c. 1745

Street vendors and their cries were known in antiquity. Claire Holleran has noted the difficulty locating evidence of street cries due to their ephemeral nature. Nevertheless, she has examined literary, legal and pictorial sources to provide insights into the presence of hawkers and their cries in antiquity, especially ancient Rome and Pompeii. Collectively these sources suggest that street vendors and their cries were part of street life. She found numerous written references to the cries used by street vendors:

- Pliny the Younger likens Regulus’ oratory to that of a seller in the forum (circulator in foro)
- The Roman poet, Martial, compares poor oratory to the sales patter of street vendors
- Quintilian’s Guide to Oratory instructs readers to aim for forceful oratory rather than the rapid speech of street hawkers
- Seneca describes a disturbance caused by a group of noisy hawkers and refers to the distinctive intonation used by pastry cooks, sausage dealers and confectioners
- Cicero describes the loud cries of a fig seller which soldiers embarking for Parthia interpreted as a bad omen
- Calpurnius Siculus describes the loud cries of a milk hawker

Literary references and images of hawkers and peddlers during the medieval period are relatively rare. Hawkers, hucksters and peddlers occupied a different social position to merchants and were regarded as marginal in society. However, English narratives from the 12th and 13th centuries suggest that hardworking hawkers could advance to positions as packmen and ultimately wealthy wholesalers or merchants.

The number of street vendors working in European cities increased markedly from the 17th century. In London, street vendors began to fill the streets in the decades following the Great Fire when a major rebuilding programme led to the removal of London's main produce market, Stocks Market, in 1773. The displacement of the open market prompted large numbers of street vendors and itinerant traders to fill the gap in food distribution by providing inexpensive produce in small quantities to the working classes, who for their part, worked long hours in arduous occupations leaving them no time to attend markets situated away from the city centre. This led to a large increase in the informal and unregulated trade carried out by street vendors.

The number of street vendors increased again in the early 18th century, following the industrial revolution, as many dislocated workers gravitated to the larger urban centres in search of work. As the city population increased, the number of street vendors also increased. Throughout the 18th and 19th centuries, the streets of London filled with street vendors, stimulating intense competition between them. To stand out amid the crowd, street vendors began to develop distinctive, melodic cries. Around the same time, these criers or street vendors filled the streets of other European cities including Paris, Bologna and Cologne.

The 19th century social commentator Henry Mayhew describes a Saturday night in the New Cut, a street in Lambeth, south of the river;

Lit by a host of lights … the Cut was packed from wall to wall… The hubbub was deafening, the traders all crying their wares with the full force of their lungs against the background din of a horde of street musicians.

Each trade developed its own unique type of street cry; a distinctive set of words or a unique tune. This operated as a means of identifying each type of seller and the goods sold, giving each trade its own "verbal and aural space".

During the 19th century, street traders came under increasing attack from the clergy and the authorities who wanted to rid the streets of the unruly and unregulated street trade. Initiatives to eradicate street trading had occurred intermittently in the past; various attempts to curtail street-based trading had been known during the reigns of Elizabeth I (1558–1603) and Charles I (1625–1649). These constant attacks contributed to a sense of group identity amongst vendors and inculcated an air of open defiance. Street traders composed their own broadsides in which they asserted their own political identity in songs.

Historians have argued that the cries of the city were far from annoying, rather they were an essential form of transmitting important information prior to the modern period of mass communications. The term, Street Cries, is written with a capital "C" to distinguish the vendors' melodic sounds from the general noise of the street. Street Cries began to disappear from the mid-20th century as permanent markets supplanted the informal and itinerant street trade.

== In literature, music and art ==
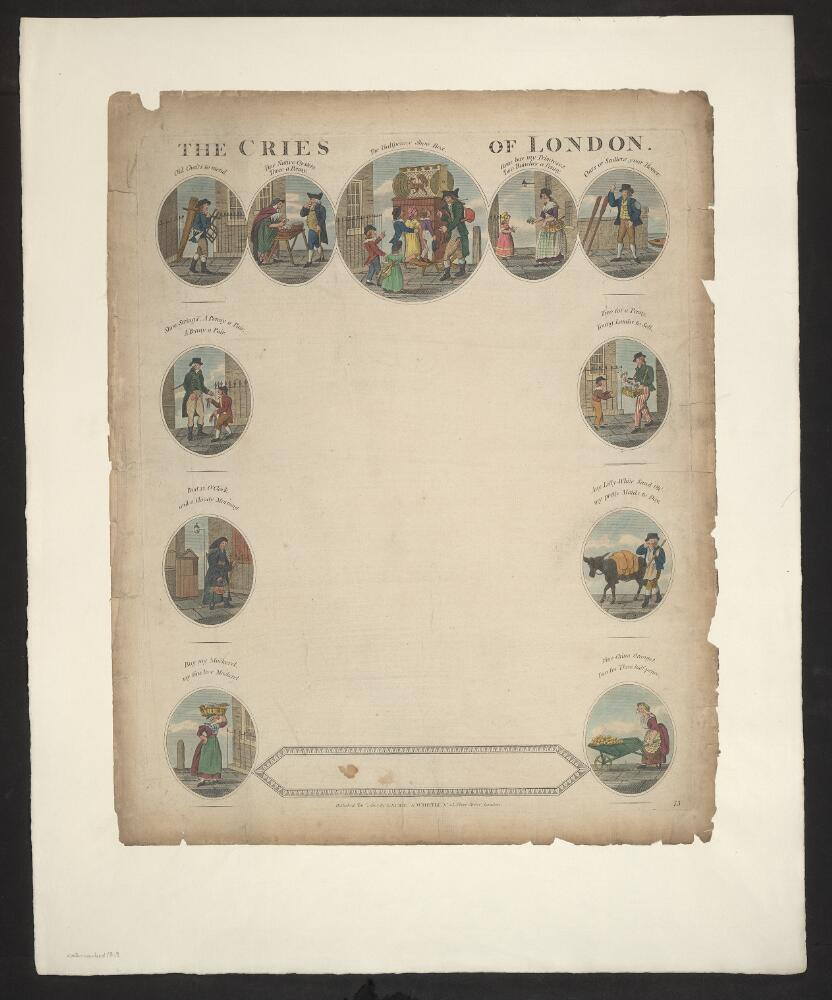
Cover of Cries of London by Robert Laurie and James Whittle, 1802

The street cries of major cities such as London and Paris became such an iconic feature of street life that the subject stimulated the interest of poets, writers, musicians and artists. One of the earliest literary works entirely devoted to the subject of street cries is Les Crieries de Paris (Street Cries of Paris), a poem by Guillame de Villeneuve published in 1265, consisting of some 130 cries harmoniously inserted into octosyllables. The narrator recounts the cries heard while wandering Paris streets, beginning at dawn and continuing until late evening. The cries punctuate the day, according to the activity of the street vendors. One of the first cries of dawn is that of the public baths and steam rooms while the cries of the pastry sellers occur at day’s end.

One of the earliest British works inspired by street cries is a ballad, allegedly written by an English monk, John Lydgate, in 1409. Known as London Lyckpeny, it refers to many street cries, including the often quoted "Strawpery ripe, and cherrys in the ryse". The ballad, is a satire that recounts the tale of a country person visiting London to seek legal remedies after having been defrauded. However, he finds that he cannot afford justice, and is soon relieved of his money through his dealings with street sellers, retailers, tavern-keepers and others. A lyckpeny (or lickpenny) is an archaic term for anything that soaks up money. Lydgate's ballad prompted generations of composers to write songs about the distinctive cries of street vendors.

As early as the 13th century, musicians included street cries into their compositions. A tune known as On Parole/ a Paris/ Frese Nouvelle, dating to the 13th century features a Parisian vendor's cry, 'Frèse nouvele! Muere france!' ('Fresh strawberries! Wild blackberries!'). From around 1600 English composers wrote tunes in which the text and probably the music incorporated street vendors' cries: Weelkes, Gibbons and Deering composed tunes that consisted almost entirely of street vendors' cries. Such tunes became very popular in the 17th century.

It has been suggested that street cries may have been one of the earliest forms of popular music. The 19th century folk song, Molly Malone, is an example of a tune based on street cries that has survived into the modern era. The lyrics show the fish vendor, Molly Malone, chanting "cockles and mussels, alive, alive, oh". The tune may have been based on an earlier 17th or 18th century song. The 1920s popular song, Yes! We Have No Bananas was inspired by the sales patter of a fruit vendor in Long Island. The tune, "El Manisero" (translated as the "Peanut Vendor"), inspired by a Cuban peanut vendor's cries, was a popular hit in the 1930s and 1940s and was largely responsible for popularising Latin music and the rhumba with American audiences.

In art, a tradition of representing ‘street cries’ developed in Europe from the 15th century and reached a peak in 18th and 19th century London and Paris. These works were primarily folios consisting of a series of etchings, engravings or lithographs with minimal notation, depicting the exuberance of street life in which street vendors were prominently featured and often romanticised images of street vendors. Nevertheless, these representations have proved to be a valuable source for social historians. Certain scholars have described this tradition as a distinct 'genre'. A series of prints in this genre was found in the personal library of Samuel Pepys. It was a mid to late 16th century series of woodcuts, illustrating a book which Pepys had catalogued as "Cryes consisting of Several Setts thereof, Antient and Moderne: with the differ Stiles us'd therein by the Cryers."

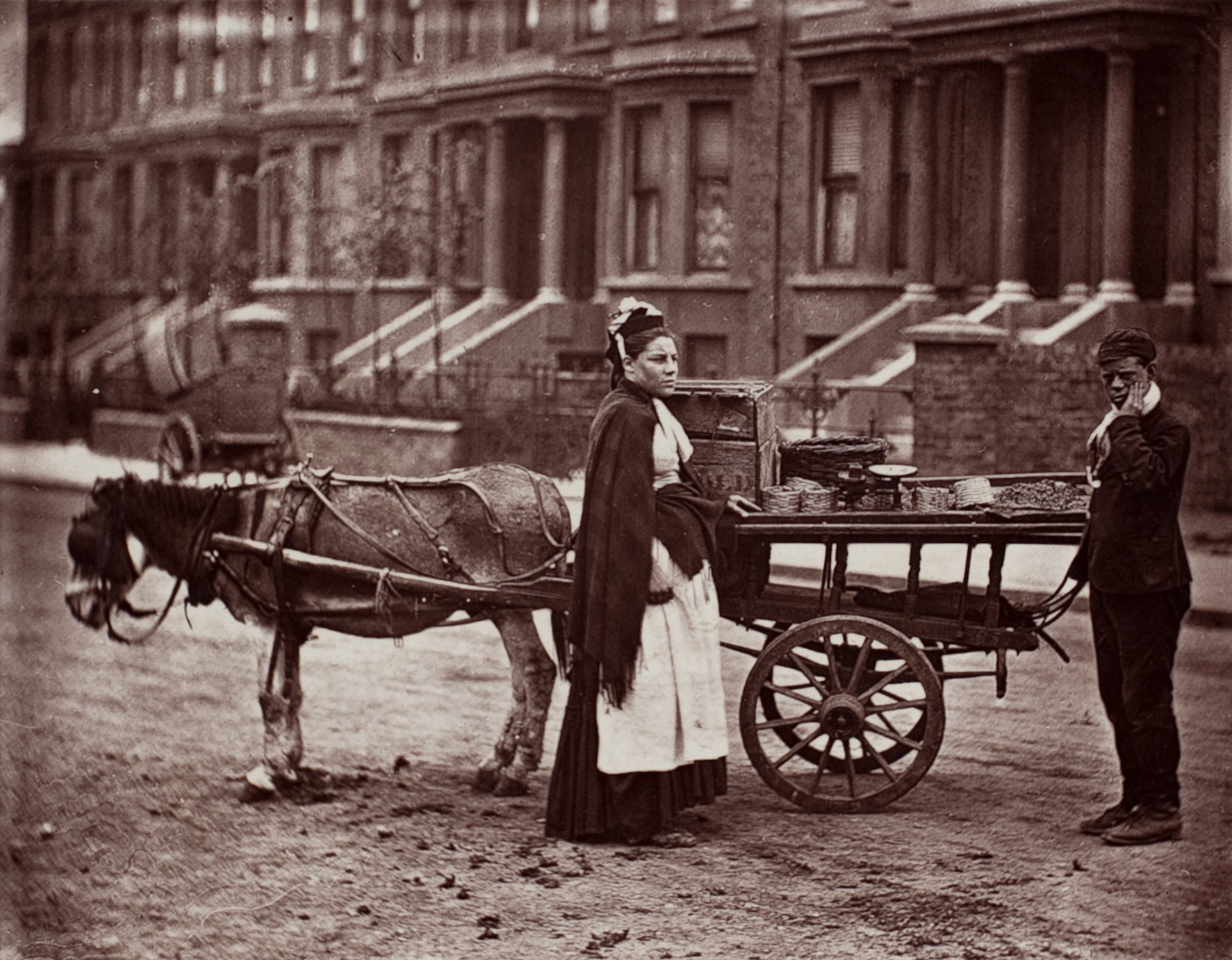
A notable feature of representations of street vendors is that the images were often given the title of the vendor’s cry as in this 1877 photograph from Street Life in London entitled, "Strawberries. All ripe! All ripe!" photograph by John Thomson in Street Life in London

One of the earliest of publications in The Cries genre was Franz Hogenberg's series of street vendors in Cologne produced in 1589. One of the first English publications of the genre was John Overton's The Common Cryes of London published in 1667. This was followed by a French publication, Etudes Prises Dans let Bas Peuple, Ou Les Cris de Paris (1737) (roughly translated as Studies Taken of the Lower People, Or The Cries of Paris); a title which became highly popular. There followed a plethora of similar publications across Europe: The Cries of London Calculated to Entertain the Minds of Old and Young was published (1760). and followed by Cries of London (1775) and The Cries of London, as they are daily exhibited in the streets: with an epigram in verse, adapted to each. Embellished with sixty-two elegant cuts (1775); a highly popular publication with a new edition published in 1791 and in its tenth edition by 1806. Other 18th century titles included: The Cries of London: for the Instruction of Good Children, (1795). As the number of street vendors burgeoned in the early 19th century, many similar titles appeared, with many titles targeting specific audiences such as children or country folk. Some of these titles include: The New Cries of London; with characteristic engravings (1804); The Cries of London; embellished with twelve engravings, The Cries of Famous London Town: as they are exhibited in the streets of the metropolis: with twenty humorous prints of the most eccentric characters; The Cries of London: shewing how to get a penny for a rainy day, (1820) Lord Thomas Busby's The Cries of London: drawn from life; with descriptive letter-press, in verse and prose (1823); James Bishop's The Cries of London: for the information of little country folks; embellished with sixteen neatly-coloured engravings, (1847); The London Cries in London Street: embellished with pretty cuts, for the use of good little boys and girls, and a copy of verses (1833). and Charles Hindley's A History of the Cries of London: Ancient and Modern, (1881).

The "Cries of London" was also a recurring theme in European painting. In the mid 1700s, the English water-colourist, Paul Sandby created a series entitled London Cries depicting English shopkeepers, stall-holders and itinerant street vendors. The Dutch engraver, Marcellus Laroon began working in London in the mid-1700s where he produced his most famous work, the series, The Cryes of London. William Hogarth's "The Enraged Musician" depicts a musician driven to despair by the cries of street vendors. The Flemish engraver and printmaker, Anthony Cardon, spent time in England in the 1790s where he produced a series of engravings of London's street sellers, known as the Cries of London. Francis Wheatley, the English painter, who had been born in Covent Garden and was well acquainted with London's street life, exhibited a series of artworks, also entitled Cries of London, between 1792 and 1795. Augustus Edwin Mulready, made his reputation by painting scenes of Victorian life which included street sellers, urchins and flower sellers. By the 18th century, card sets were being decorated with coloured woodcuts in the Street Cries genre and in the late 19th and early 20th centuries the images of Cries were being used on cigarette cards and other advertising cards. For example, John Players' cigarettes produced two series of advertising cards entitled Cries of London in 1913 (1st series) and 1916 (2nd series). Grenadier cigarettes also produced a two sets entitled Street Cries, one in 1902 and another in the post-war period.

Selected engravings from the Street Cries genre, as published in the 17th, 18th and 19th centuries

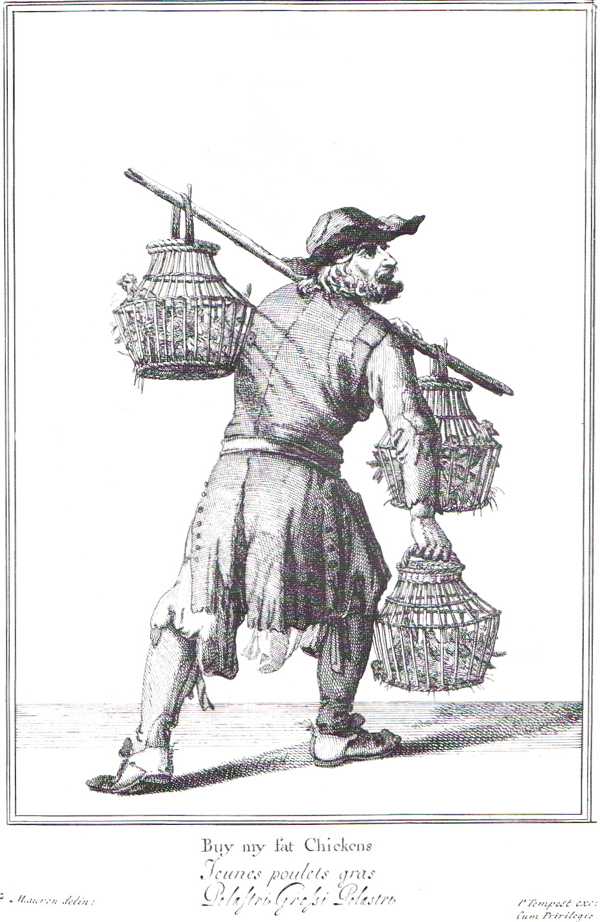
"Buy my fat Chickens" engraving by Marcellus Laroon from Cryes of the City of London Drawne after the Life 1687

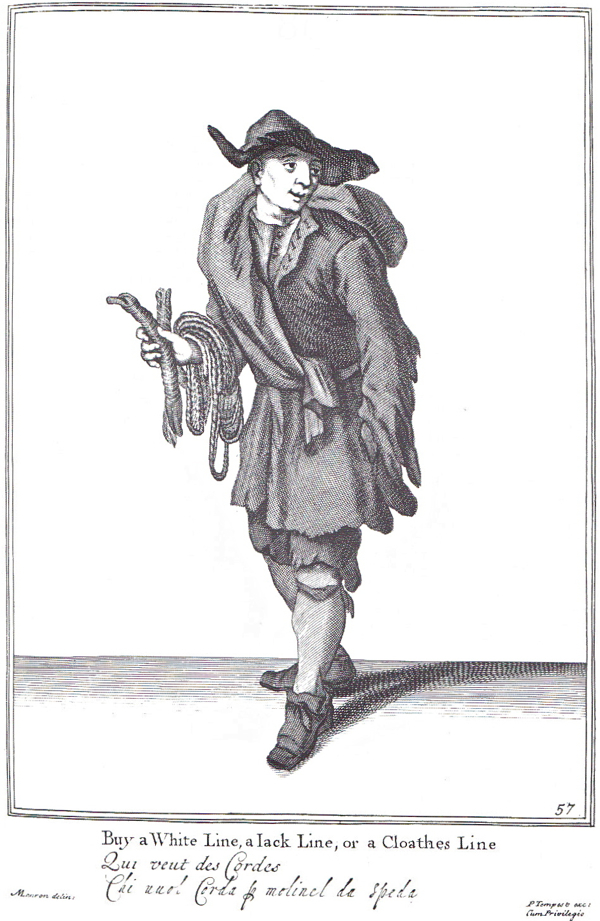
"Buy a White Line, a Iack Line, or a Cloathes Line" engraving by Marcellus Laroon from Cryes of the City of London Drawne after the Life 1687

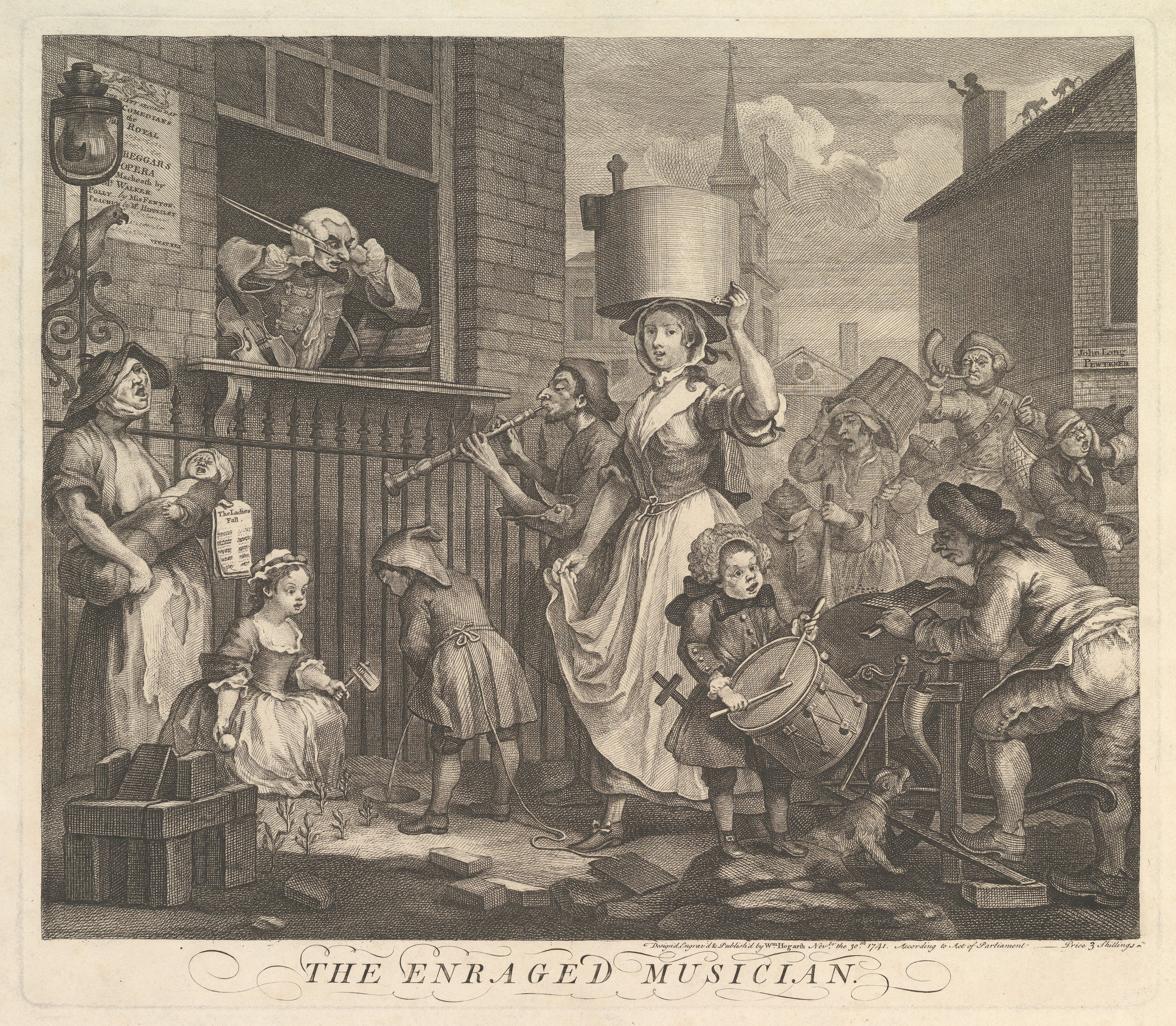
The Enraged Musician by William Hogarth, 1741

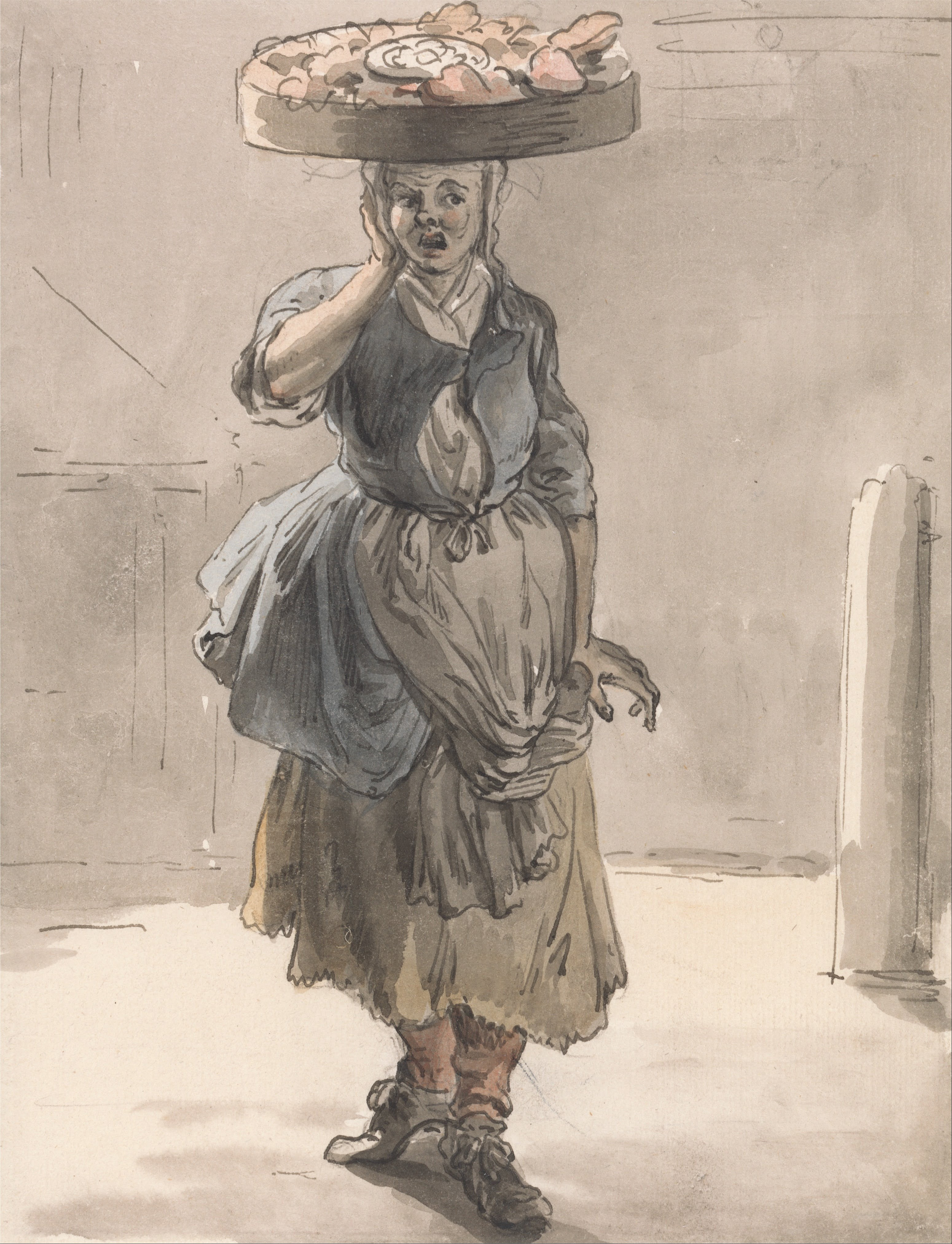
"Lights for the Cats, Liver for the Dogs" from the London Cries series by Paul Sandby, c. 1770

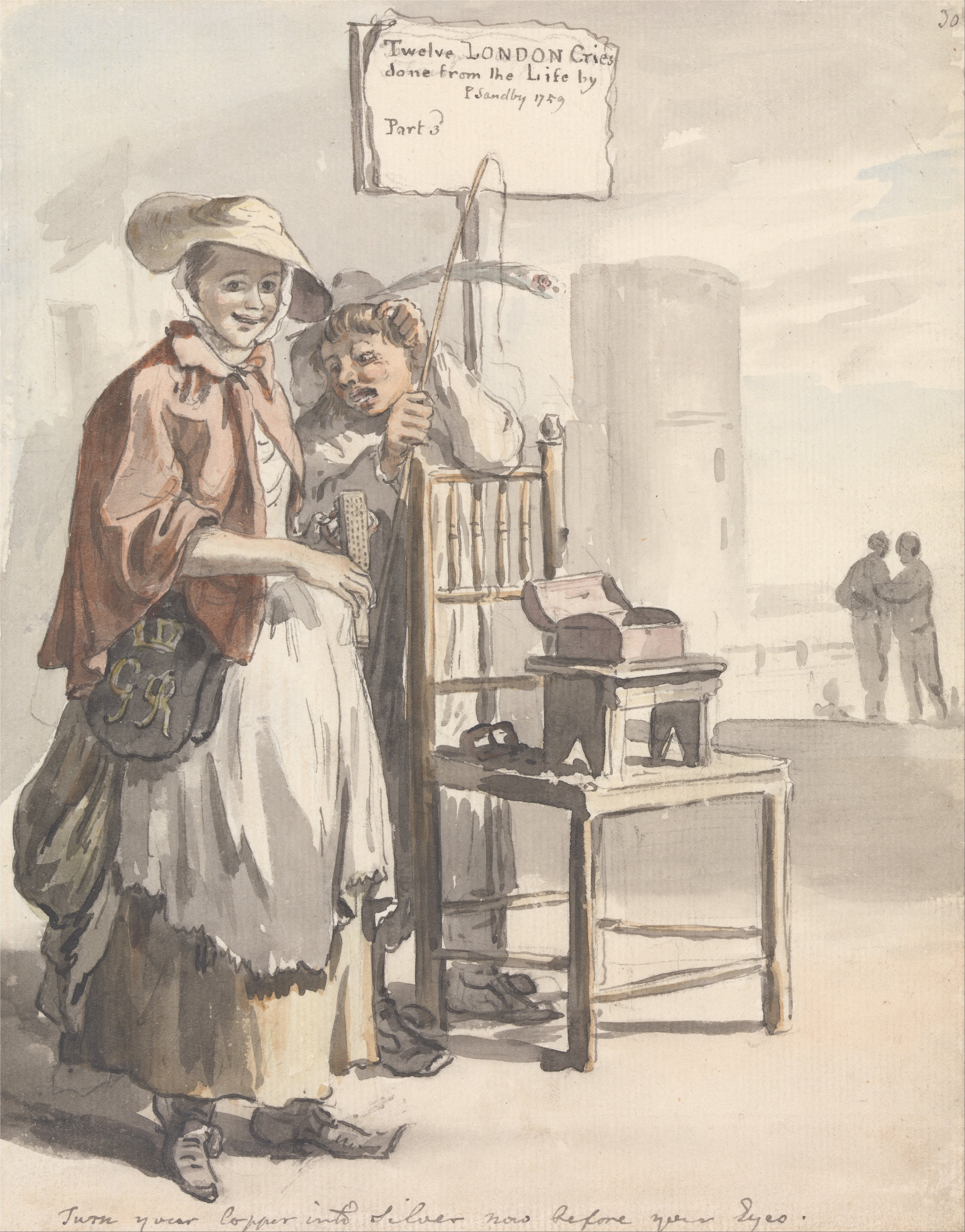
"Turn Your Copper into Silver, Now Before Your Eyes", from the London Cries series by Paul Sandby, 1770

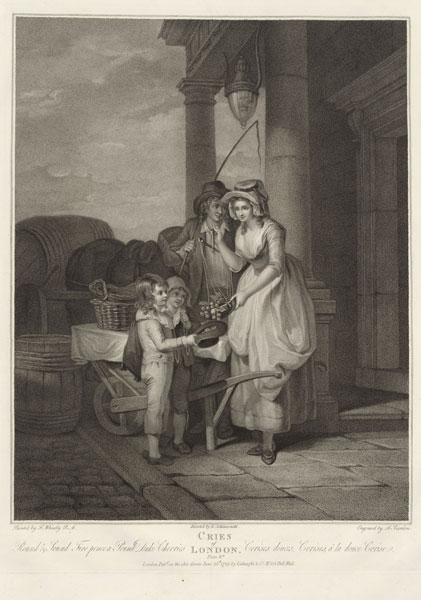
"Round & Sound Five Pence Pound Duke Cherries from the Cries of London, by Anthony Cardon. 1795

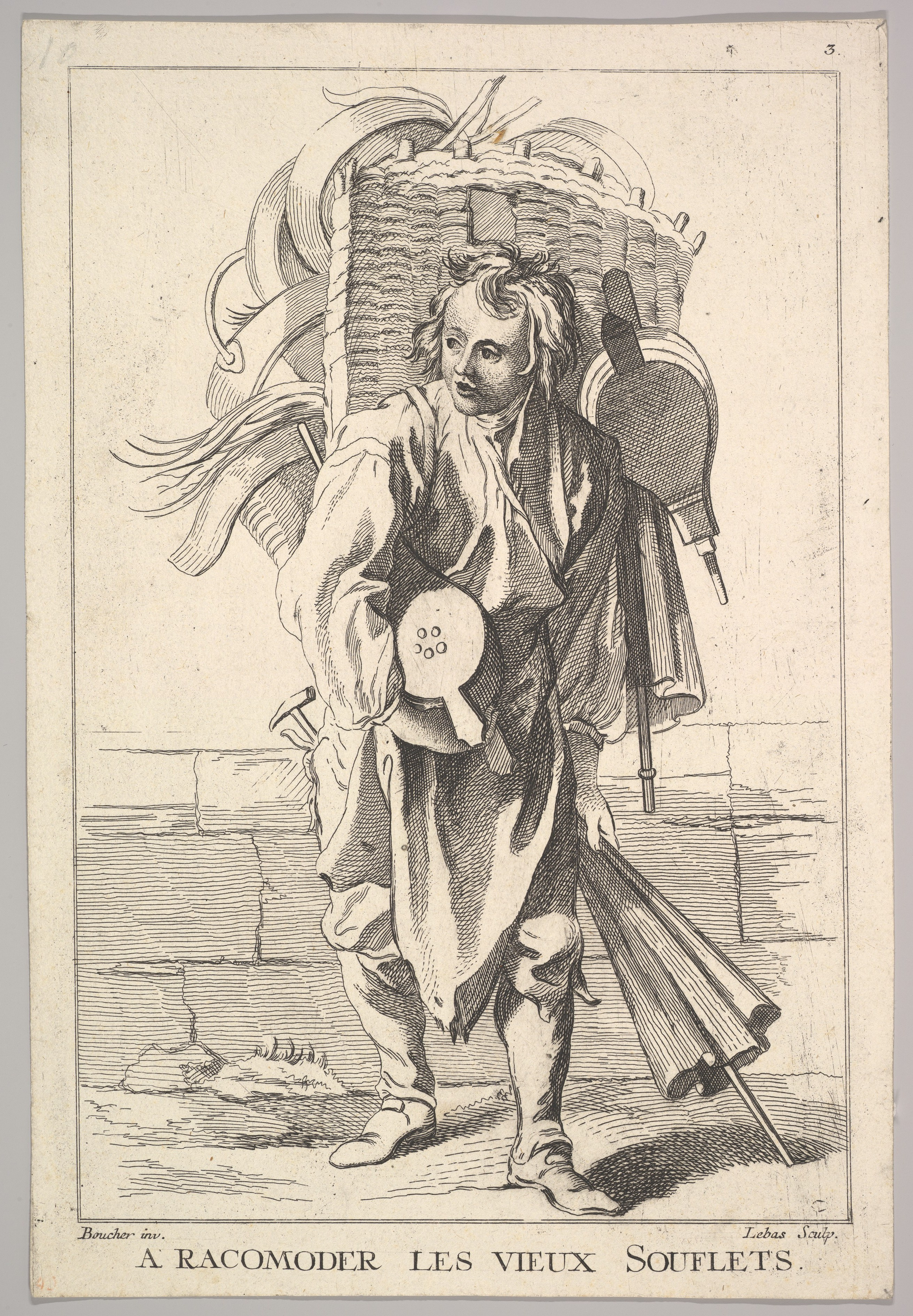
"Mend the Old Bellows" from Le Cris de Paris 18th century

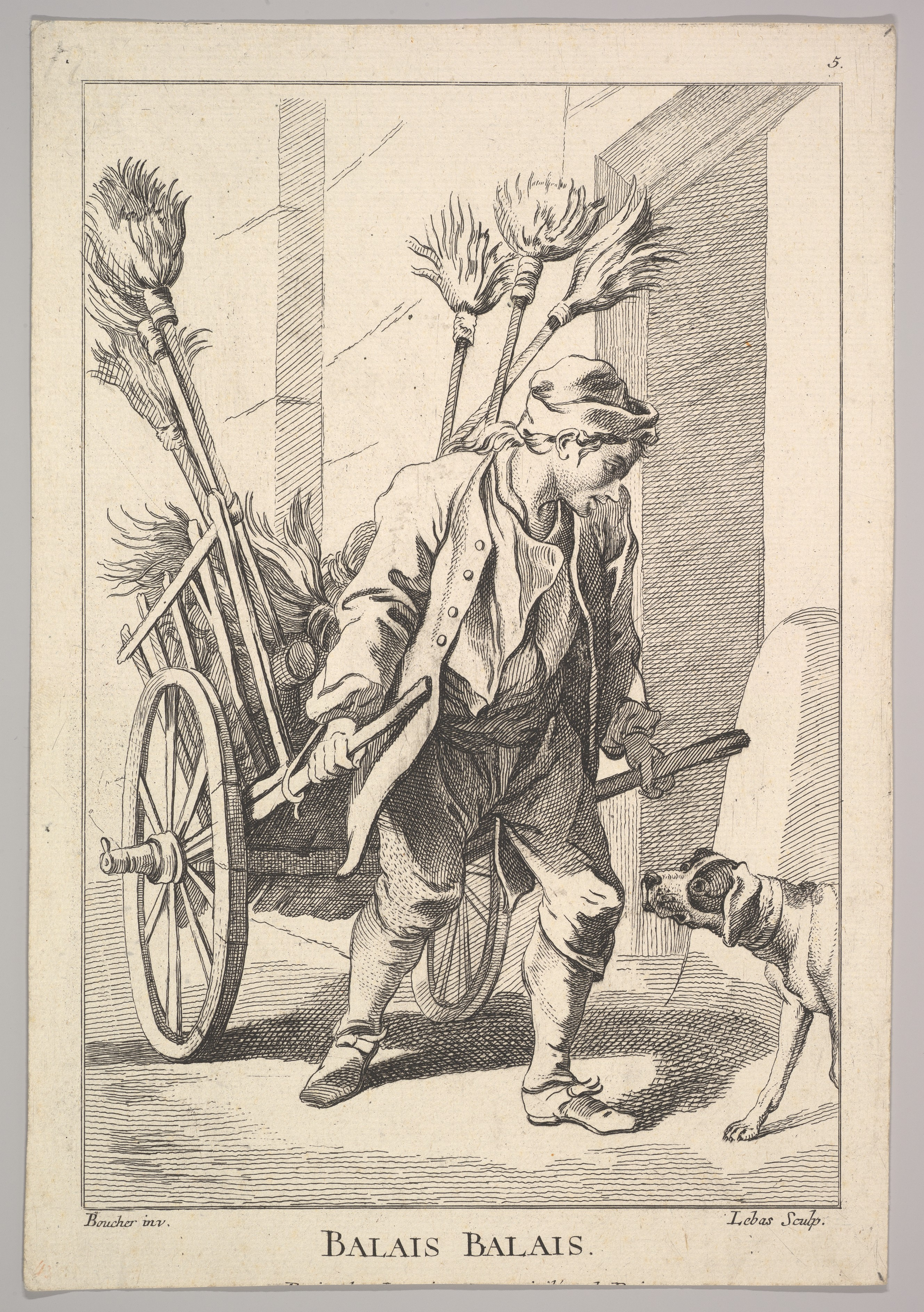
Brushes, brushes! By Jacques Philippe Le Bas, 1707-1783

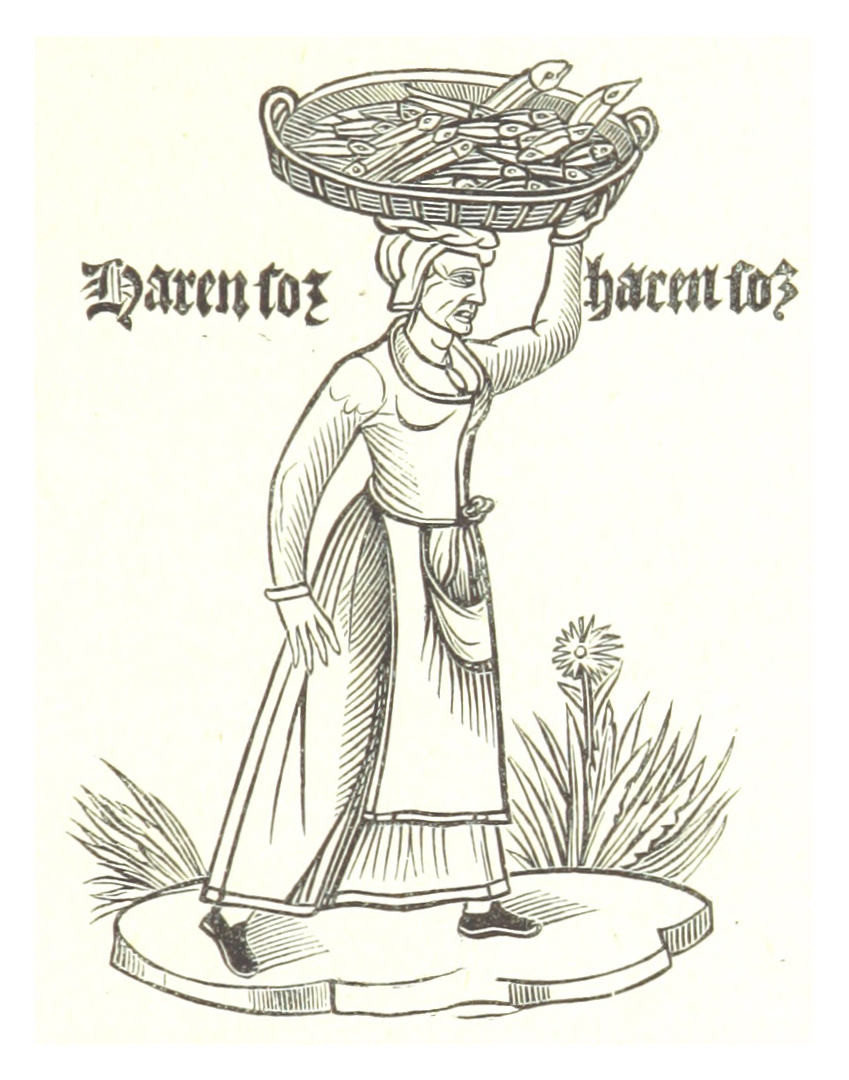
Herrings, Come Out! From Cris de Paris du XVe siècle, 1887

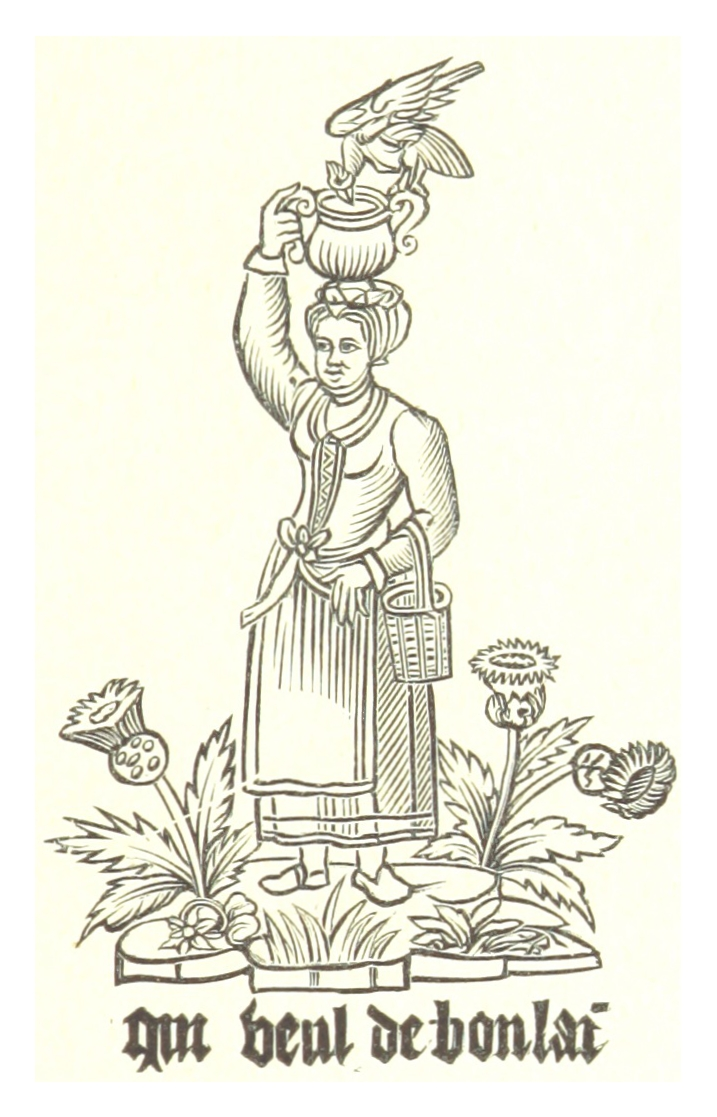
Who will buy good milk? from Cris de Paris du XVe siècle, 1887

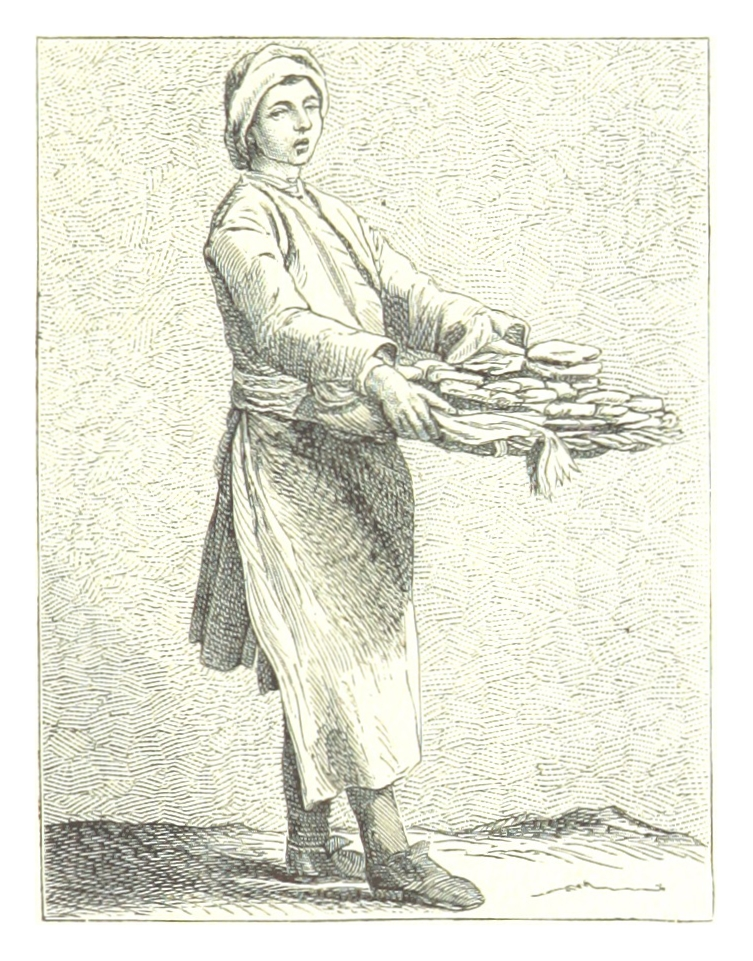
Little pastries, all hot! From, Cris de Paris du XVe siècle, 1887

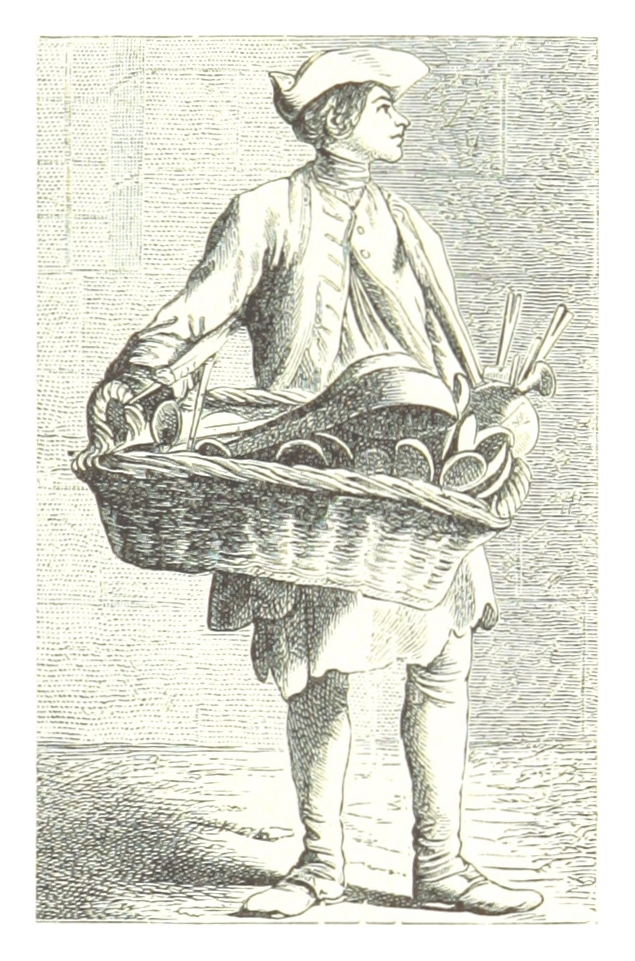
Buy My Larders! From, Cris de Paris du XVe siècle, 1887

== See also ==
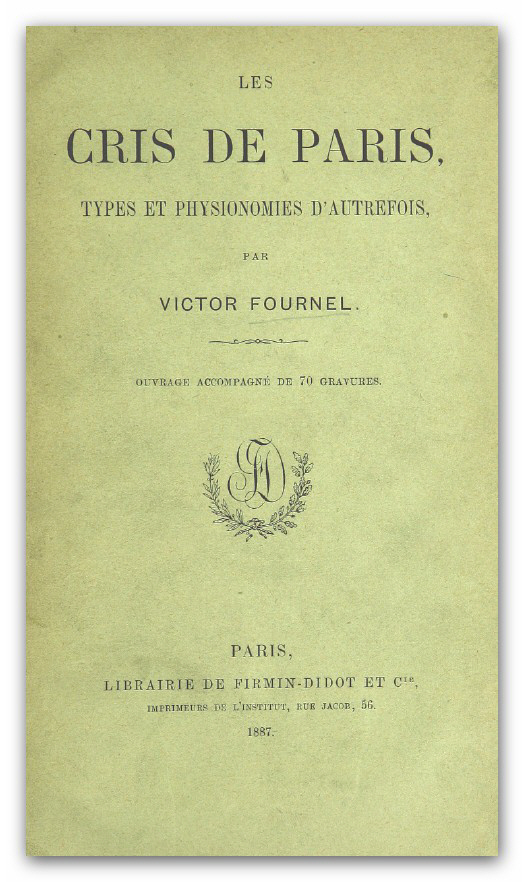
Cover page of Les Cris de Paris: types et physionomies d'autrefois, by Victor Fournel, 1887

- As I was going by Charing Cross
- Cherry Ripe
- Cockney
- Costermonger
- Hawker (trade)
- Hot cross buns
- Peddler
- Pregón - Spanish for a street cry or street song
- Street vendor
- Street food
- Town crier

== Further research and reading ==
- BBC [Documentary], London Street-Cries and Songs, <Online: https://www.bbc.co.uk/programmes/p033xhtc> (includes audio of cries)
- Chilcott, B., Songs and Cries of London Town, [Vocal Score], Oxford University Press, 2001
- Millar, D., Street Criers and Itinerant Tradesmen in European Prints, 1970
- Parker, K.T., Bouchardon's Cries of Paris' in Old Master Drgs, vol. 19, 1930
- Shesgreen, S. (ed.), The Criers and Hawkers of London: Engravings and Drawings by Marcellus Laroon, Stanford, Stanford University Press, 1990
- Wilson, E., "Plagues, Fairs, and Street Cries: Sounding out Society and Space in Early Modern London," Modern Language Studies, Vol. 25, No. 3, 1995, pp 1–42 doi:10.2307/3195370 <Stable URL: https://www.jstor.org/stable/3195370 JSTOR
- Milliot, V. and Roche, D, Les "Cris de Paris", ou, Le peuple travesti: les représentations des petits métiers parisiens (XVIe-XVIIIe siècles), [The "Cries of Paris", or, the itinerant people: Representations of small Parisian trades (16th-18th centuries)], Publications de la Sorbonne, 1995 (in French)
