= Looe West, Pelynt, Lansallos and Lanteglos (electoral division) =

Electoral division of Cornwall in the UK

- ward Cornwall Council
- Boundary of Looe West, Pelynt, Lansallos and Lanteglos in Cornwall from 2021-present.
- County: Cornwall
- Population: 5,807
- Electorate: 4,784

Current ward
- Created: 2021
- Councillor: Jim Candy (Liberal Democrats)
- Number of councillors: One
- Created from: Looe West, Lansallos and Lanteglos
- Number of councillors: One

Looe West, Pelynt, Lansallos and Lanteglos (Cornish: Porthbyhan, Pluwnennys, Lannsalwys ha Nanseglos) is an electoral division of Cornwall in the United Kingdom which returns one member to sit on Cornwall Council from 2021. Before the 2021 local elections, the area was a part of Looe West, Lansallos and Lanteglos ward.

== Councillors ==
Election	Member	Party
2021	Edwina Hannaford	Liberal Democrat
2024 by-election	Jim Candy	Liberal Democrat

== Background ==
Looe West, Pelynt, Lansallos and Lanteglos represents the town of West Looe, the villages of Pelynt, Polruan, Bodinnick, Lansallos, Polperro, Porthallow and Lanteglos Highway, and the hamlets of Mixtow, Crumplehorn, Carey Park, Talland and Trenewan. The ward is home to 5,807 residents, and an electorate of 4,784.

Within the ward, 676 people (11.6% of the residents) specified a Cornish only identity and 42 (0.7%) Cornish in combination with British - this is notably lower than the rest of Cornwall (14% and 1.6% respectively). 2,802 people (48% of residents) are in households experiencing deprivation, and 2,043 (35%) are retirees. 290 residents hold a second address outside of Cornwall, about 4.9%.

== Election results ==
=== 2024 by-election ===
Following the death of Liberal Democrat councillor Edwina Hannaford, due to "an aggressive form of cancer", a by-election was called on 27 February 2024. The poll took place on Thursday 4 April 2024. The seat was retained by the Liberal Democrats with reduced vote share, securing 44.8% of the vote.

Looe West, Pelynt, Lansallos and Lanteglos
Party	Candidate	Votes	%	±%
Liberal Democrats	Jim Candy	604	44.8	−16.6
Conservative	Richard Dorling	414	30.7	+0.5
Labour	Amy Ladd	254	18.9	+10.5
Green	Paul Clark	75	5.6	New
Majority		210	15.5	
Turnout		1353	28.28	
Liberal Democrats hold		Swing		

=== 2021 election ===
2021 election: Looe West, Pelynt, Lansallos and Lanteglos
Party	Candidate	Votes	%	±%
Liberal Democrats	Edwina Hannaford*	1,282	61.4	N/A
Conservative	Ron Greenhough	633	30.3	N/A
Labour	Rod Truan	174	8.3	N/A
Majority		649	31.1	N/A
Turnout		2,089	42	N/A
Liberal Democrats win (new seat)				
