= Looe West, Lansallos and Lanteglos (electoral division) =

Former electoral division of Cornwall in the UK

- Former ward Cornwall Council
- Boundary of Looe West, Lansallos and Lanteglos in Cornwall from 2013-2021.
- County: Cornwall

2013–2021
- Number of councillors: One
- Replaced by: Looe West, Pelynt, Lansallos and Lanteglos
- Created from: Lostwithiel; Looe West and Lansallos
- Number of councillors: One

Looe West, Lansallos and Lanteglos (Cornish: Porthbyhan, Lannsalwys ha Nanseglos) was an electoral division of Cornwall in the United Kingdom which returned one member to sit on Cornwall Council between 2013 and 2021. It was abolished at the 2021 local elections, being succeeded by Looe West, Pelynt, Lansallos and Lanteglos

== Councillors ==
Election	Member	Party
2013	Edwina Hannaford	Liberal Democrat
2017	Edwina Hannaford	Liberal Democrat
2021	Seat abolished	

== Extent ==
Looe West, Lansallos and Lanteglos represented the town of West Looe, the villages of Polruan, Bodinnick, Lansallos, Polperro, Porthallow and Lanteglos Highway, and the hamlets of Mixtow, Crumplehorn, Carey Park, Talland and Trenewan. The division covered 3,660 hectares in total.

== Election results ==
=== 2017 election ===
2017 election: Looe West, Lansallos and Lanteglos
Party	Candidate	Votes	%	±%
Liberal Democrats	Edwina Hannaford	1,119	63.3	
Conservative	Bob Davidson	636	36.0	
Majority		483	27.3	
Rejected ballots		13	0.7	
Turnout		1768	46.3	
Liberal Democrats hold		Swing		

=== 2013 election ===
2013 election: Looe West, Lansallos and Lanteglos
Party	Candidate	Votes	%	±%
Liberal Democrats	Edwina Hannaford	963	50.5	
Conservative	Brian Galipeau	523	27.4	
UKIP	Tony Winter	402	21.1	
Majority		440	23.1	
Rejected ballots		18	0.9	
Turnout		1906	48.7	
Liberal Democrats win (new seat)				
