= River Pol =

River in south-east Cornwall, England

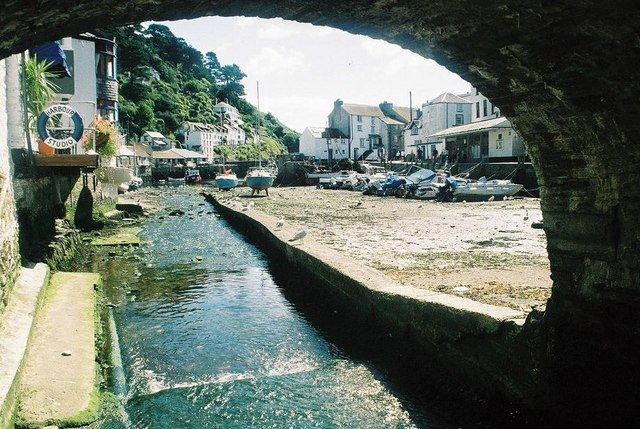
- The River Pol where it flows into the sea at Polperro harbour

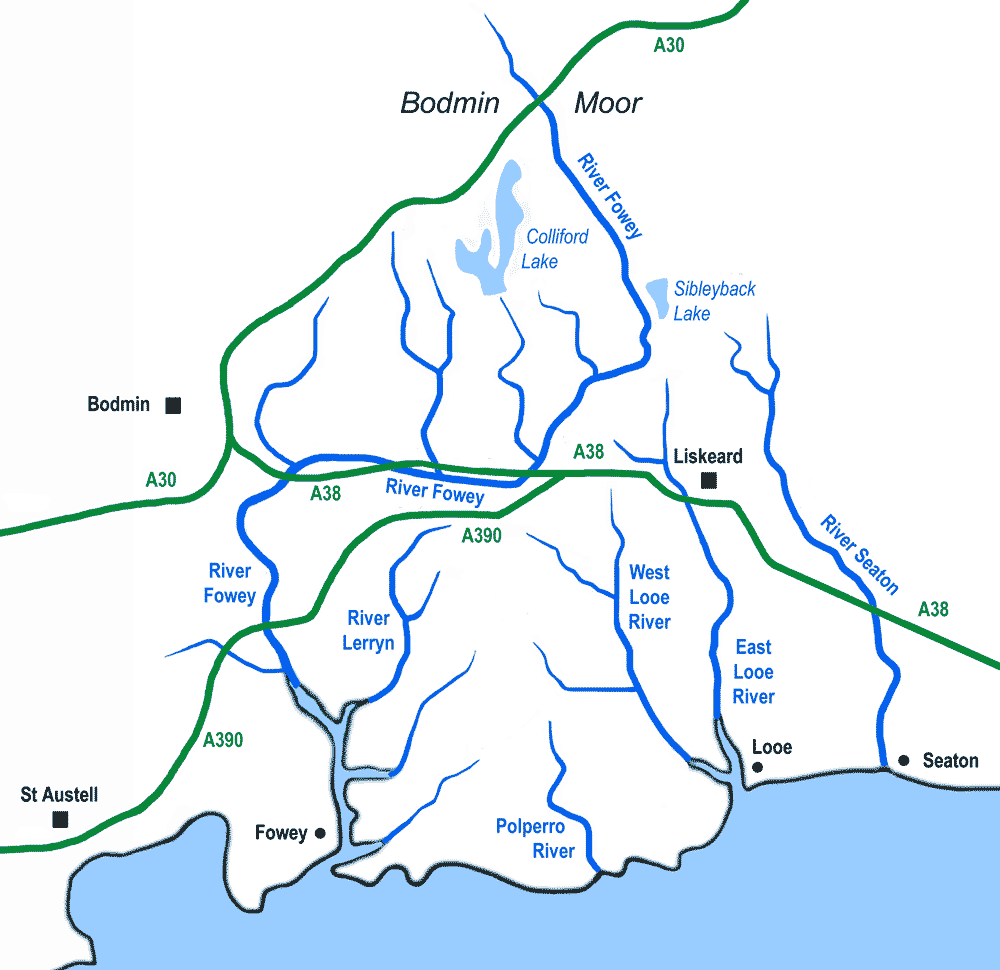
- The course of the River Pol (centre) and neighbouring rivers in Cornwall

Location
- Country: England
- Counties: Cornwall
- Villages: Polperro

Physical characteristics
- Source
  - location: Pelynt
- Mouth
  - location: Polperro
  - coordinates: 50.3314°N 4.5183°W
- Length: 6.4 km (4.0 mi)

The River Pol, also known as the Polperro River, is a small river in southeastern Cornwall. The river rises near the village of Pelynt, and then flows through a steep valley into the hamlet of Crumplehorn before reaching Polperro. Within the village of Polperro it flows alongside a number of buildings and passes under many bridges, before it finally reaches the harbour and flows into the sea.
