= Richard Couch =

Richard Couch may refer to:

- Sir Richard Couch (judge), Anglo-Indian judge
- Richard Quiller Couch, British naturalist

== See also ==
- Dick Couch, American author, professor, and former U.S. Navy SEAL
