= Tallanus =

Cornish saint

Tallanus is thought to have been a Cornish saint. It is claimed that he was a hermit in the 5th century and lived at Talland between Polperro and Looe. The parish church of Talland, which is believed to be a 5th-century foundation, is consecrated to him – the only one in Britain. One explanation of the word 'Talland' is that it is a derivation of the Saint's name. However, the name Tallanus first appears in documents in the 15th century and there is some evidence to suggest that he was an invention of that period.

The first recorded reference to the church now dedicated to Saint Tallanus (the Latinised version of tallan) is in 1205 "the church at Tallan". Tal and Lan are Cornish. Tal = "brow of the hill" and Lan = "holy place" (or church). Together they perfectly describe the church that the Augustine monks of Launceston established at Tallan (between 1086–1205), and as with other Cornish churches all that seems to have happened is that "saint" has been put in front of a Cornish place name so as to tie that parish to a saint.

There is no recorded reference to a Tallanus prior to 1452 and certainly no evidence that Tallanus was a saint.

== Sources ==
- Talland Church
- Theological debate
