= Lekerock Cove =

Cove in Cornwall, England

- Secluded cove / beach
- Coordinates: 50.3328°N 4.4993°W
- Location: Cornwall, England

Lekerock Cove is a small, secluded sandy cove located on the south‐east coast of Cornwall, England, near Talland Bay between Looe and Polperro. It lies within the Cornwall Area of Outstanding Natural Beauty, just off the South West Coast Path.

== Geography and Access ==
Lekerock Cove is tucked beneath steep cliffs, situated near Downend Rock and Talland Sand. It is accessible via a steep descent from the South West Coast Path, commonly reached on foot during hiking between Polperro and Looe. The nearest car park is in Talland Bay. Lekerock Cove is not recommended for small children or anyone with limited mobility

== Description ==
The beach is small—approximately 130 metres long, known for its clear water. Due to its challenging access and remote setting, it remains quiet and lightly used. Visitors must supply their own provisions, as there are no facilities on site.

== See also ==
- Talland Bay
- South West Coast Path
