= William Rendle =

British antiquarian (1811–1893)

William Rendle (1811–1893), antiquary, son of William Rendle of Polperro, near Fowey, Cornwall, who married, May 1810, Mary, daughter of William and Dorothy Johns of the same place, was born at the village of Millbrook, Cornwall, 18 Feb. 1811. He was trained by his parents in the principles of Wesleyanism. When little more than four he was brought by his father to Southwark in a trader from Fowey, taking six weeks on the passage. He was educated at the British and Foreign training school, Borough Road, Southwark, and afterwards became its honorary surgeon. When he determined upon a medical career, he was sent to Guy's Hospital, and to the medical school of Edward Grainger in Webb Street, Maze Pond, Southwark.

Rendle passed as L.S.A. in 1832 and M.R.C.S. of England in 1838, and in 1873 he became F.R.C.S. For nearly fifty years he practised in Southwark, and from 1856 to 1859 he was Medical Officer of Health for the parish of St. George the Martyr, Southwark. He lived at Treverbyn, Forest Hill, and died there on 18 Sept. 1893, leaving issue four sons and one daughter.

Rendle was deeply interested in the borough of Southwark, and engaged in laborious researches into its history. His chief works are : Old Southwark and its People (1878), and The Inns of Old Southwark and Their Associations (1888), the last volume being the joint labour of Rendle and Philip Norman, F.S.A., who revised and rearranged the manuscript materials, drew the more important illustrations, and superintended the publication. Both works contain much original information. Rendle contributed historical sketches to Etchings of Old Southwark, and a paper on the Bankside, Southwark, and the Globe playhouse to Harrison's Description of England for the New Shakspere Society (1877). The last essay was expanded by him in articles in the Antiquarian Magazine. He contributed to the Antiquary papers of Reminiscences chiefly on Southwark, Early Hospitals of Southwark, and Records of St. Thomas's Hospital. Articles by him on three Southwark residents, John Harvard, Alleyn, and Henslowe and on the puritan migration to New England, appeared in the Genealogist.
