= Jonathan Couch =

British naturalist

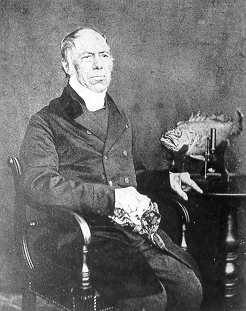
- Born: 15 March 1789; Polperro, Cornwall, England
- Died: 13 April 1870 (aged 81); Polperro, Cornwall, England
- Scientific career
- Fields: Ichthyology

Jonathan Couch (15 March 1789 – 13 April 1870) was a Cornish naturalist, the only child of Richard and Philippa Couch, of a family long resident at Polperro, a small fishing village between Looe and Fowey, on the south coast of Cornwall. A blue plaque on the wall of Warren cottage commemorates his birthplace.

== Biography ==
After receiving a classical education in Cornish schools, and some years' pupillage with two local medical men, he entered the united hospitals of Guy's and St. Thomas's in 1808, and in 1809 or early in 1810 returned to Polperro, where he served as doctor to the village for sixty years. He died on 13 April 1870, aged 81.

== Natural history ==
He trained in succession a large number of fishermen to aid him in his pursuits, and the observations made at and near Polperro during his lifetime and since his death have not been equalled in value at any British station. He was in correspondence with many of the foremost naturalists, and especially rendered aid to Thomas Bewick and to William Yarrell. Another correspondent was Thomas Edward, of Banff, who sent him numerous fish specimens whose identification was doubtful. Among his local fellow-workers and coadjutors, each of them notable, were C. W. Peach, Matthias Dunn (of Mevagissey, Cornwall, 1830-1901), and William Loughrin.

Couch's principal work was done in ichthyology. In 1835 he obtained a prize offered by Mr. J. Buller of Morval for the best natural history of the pilchard, printed in the third report of the Royal Cornwall Polytechnic Society, and also separately. He had before this given much assistance to Bewick in his British Quadrupeds, as well as in relation to his projected Natural History of British Fishes, and Yarrell was still more indebted to him in his British Fishes, to all three editions of which (1836, 1841, and 1859) Couch was a copious contributor.

His Cornish Fauna, (part i. 1838, part ii. 1841), completed by his son Richard Quiller Couch in 1844, was another valuable piece of work. But his magnum opus was A History of the Fishes of the British Islands, with coloured illustrations from his own drawings, (4 vols., London, 1860–65). This is a storehouse of information, carefully collected and sifted, as to the habits of fishes, and in many cases the illustrations give unique representations of the vivid natural colours of fishes while yet alive or immediately after death. A multitude of shorter papers and notes on natural history were contributed by Couch to the Imperial Magazine, edited by his friend Samuel Drew, from 1819 to 1830, the Transactions and Proceedings of the Linnean Society, the Magazine of Natural History, the Reports of the Royal Cornwall Polytechnic Society, the Journal of the Royal Institution of Cornwall, the Reports of the British Association, Annals of Natural History, the Transactions of the Penzance Natural History and Antiquarian Society, the Zoologist, the Intellectual Observer, &c., which are recorded in Boase and Courtney's Bibliotheca Cornubiensis, (i. 89–92, and iii. 1138), and in the History of Polperro (a less complete list). He also contributed to Land and Water, under the signature 'Video.'

His Illustrations of Instinct, deduced from the Habits of British Animals, (1847), is a very interesting book. He translated Pliny's Natural History, with notes, and vols. i. and ii. and parts i. to v. of vol. iii. were published by the Wernerian Club, (1847–50). He left behind him in manuscript Notes and Extracts on Subjects of Natural History, and bearing on the ancient condition of the Science, now in the library of the Royal Institution of Cornwall; A Treatise on Dreams; Historical Biographies of Animals known to the Ancients; Materials for a History of the British Cetacea; A Journal of Natural History, being the result of my own observations or derived from living testimony, (1805–70, 12 vols.; figures of Cornish shells, coloured); A Natural History of Cornish Fishes, with pen-and-ink and coloured figures, (1836), in the library of the Linnean Society. This is the volume employed by Yarrell in his British Fishes, and quoted by him as 'Couch's MSS.' Dr. F. Day published a series of most interesting extracts from Couch's manuscript journals in Land and Water from 11 August 1883 to 29 March 1884. Other albums of his original drawings of fishes are in the John Rylands Library, and the Natural History Museum As a local naturalist whose conscientious and loving observation of nature has made a lasting impression on science, he deserves to rank beside Gilbert White.

== Personal life and antiquarian research ==
Couch was a Methodist of the Free Church. His sincere religious views tinctured much of his writing and influenced his social conduct. Couch was an excellent local antiquary, as to words, customs, and remains. The History of Polperro, (1871), issued after his death by his son, T. Q. Couch, is his chief work in this department. The stories in this book were re-used by Louisa Sarah Ann Parr in her successful novel about smuggling titled Adam and Eve.

Couch left three sons by his second wife: Richard Quiller, Thomas Quiller (father of Sir Arthur Quiller-Couch), and John Quiller, who all became surgeons (Quiller being their mother's maiden name and Quiller's House the family residence). Thomas practised successfully at Bodmin, and died on 23 October 1884, aged 58. He was a constant contributor to Notes and Queries, two series of his articles, The Folklore of a Cornish Village, 1855 and 1857, being incorporated in the History of Polperro to which he contributed a sketch of his father's life. The welfare of the fishermen and the prosperity of the fisheries were equally his care. He also published lists of local words in the Journal of the Royal Institution of Cornwall (1864 and 1870), afterwards expanded and included in a Glossary of Words in Use in Cornwall, issued by the English Dialect Society in 1880. He did some useful preparatory work in Cornish bibliography, afterwards incorporated in the Bibliotheca Cornubiensis (Academy, 1 Nov. 1884, p. 289).

== Honoria ==
- The goby fish Gobius couchi is named after him.
