= Net Loft =

Net Loft, Polperro
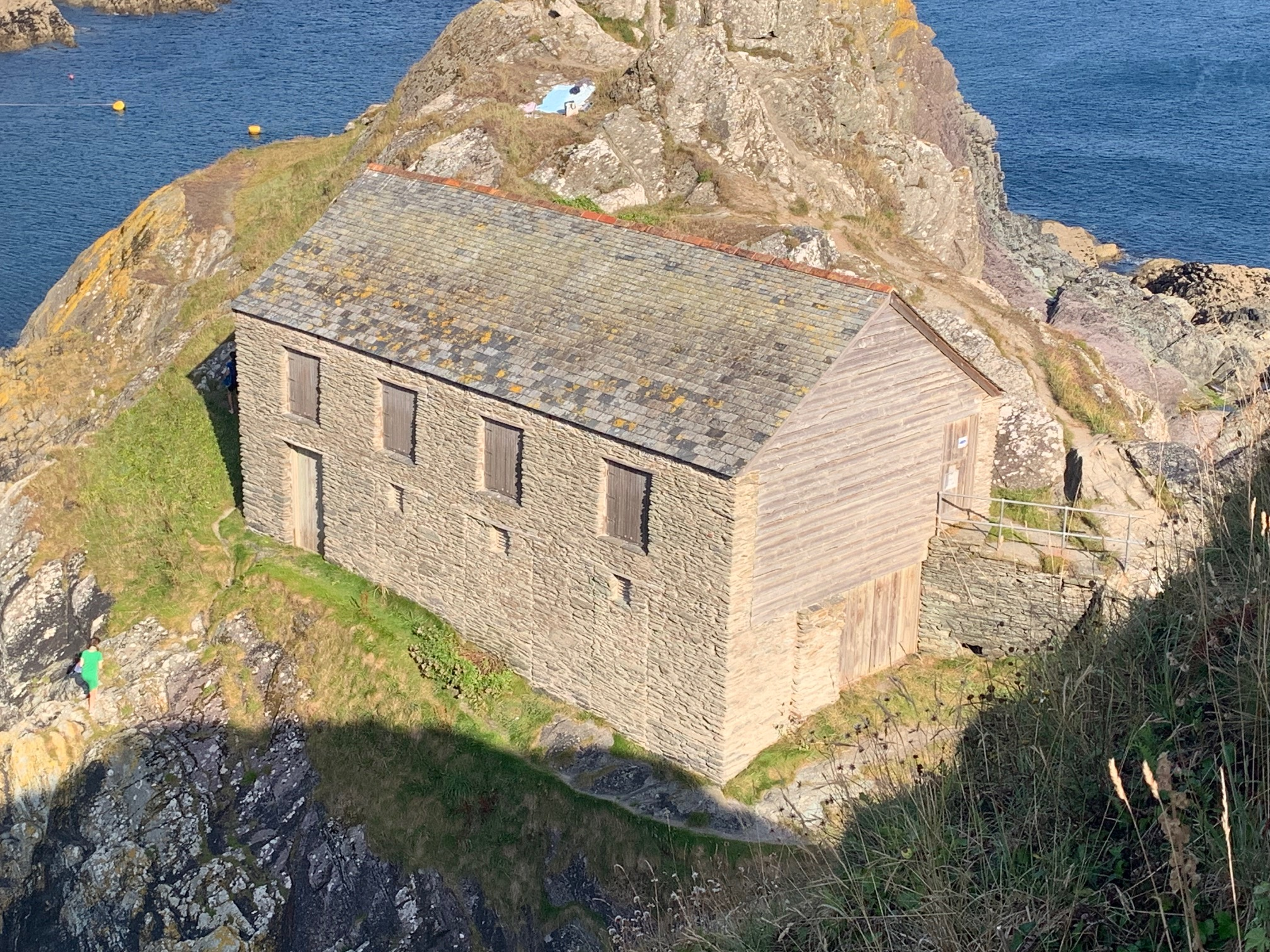
- The Net Loft at the entrance to Polperro Harbour, Cornwall
- Interactive map of Net Loft, Polperro

General information
- Type: Former net storage building / boat loft
- Location: Polperro, Cornwall, England
- Coordinates: 50°19′49″N 4°30′57″W
- Completed: 19th century (site of earlier chapel)
- Renovated: 2015–16
- Governing body: National Trust

The Net Loft is a historic Grade II listed building located atop Peak Rock at the mouth of Polperro Harbour in Cornwall, England. Originally serving as a storage facility for fishing nets and sails, it occupies what is believed to have been the site of Polperro’s 19th‑century chapel, built for local fishermen.

== History ==
Local tradition holds that in the early 19th century, a chapel dedicated to St Peter, originally situated above the harbour, was relocated to Peak Rock. The lower floor was used for boat‑building activities, and the upper floor to store sails and nets, hence becoming known as the "Net Loft".

The building’s design reflected its purpose: storage for seine nets, with a roller on the outer wall for loading nets onto boats. Its upper fireplace suggests temporary overnight stays by fishermen.

Following the decline of pilchard fishing in the late 19th century, the Net Loft fell into disuse. In 2015–16, the National Trust restored the building to preserve its heritage.

== Architecture ==
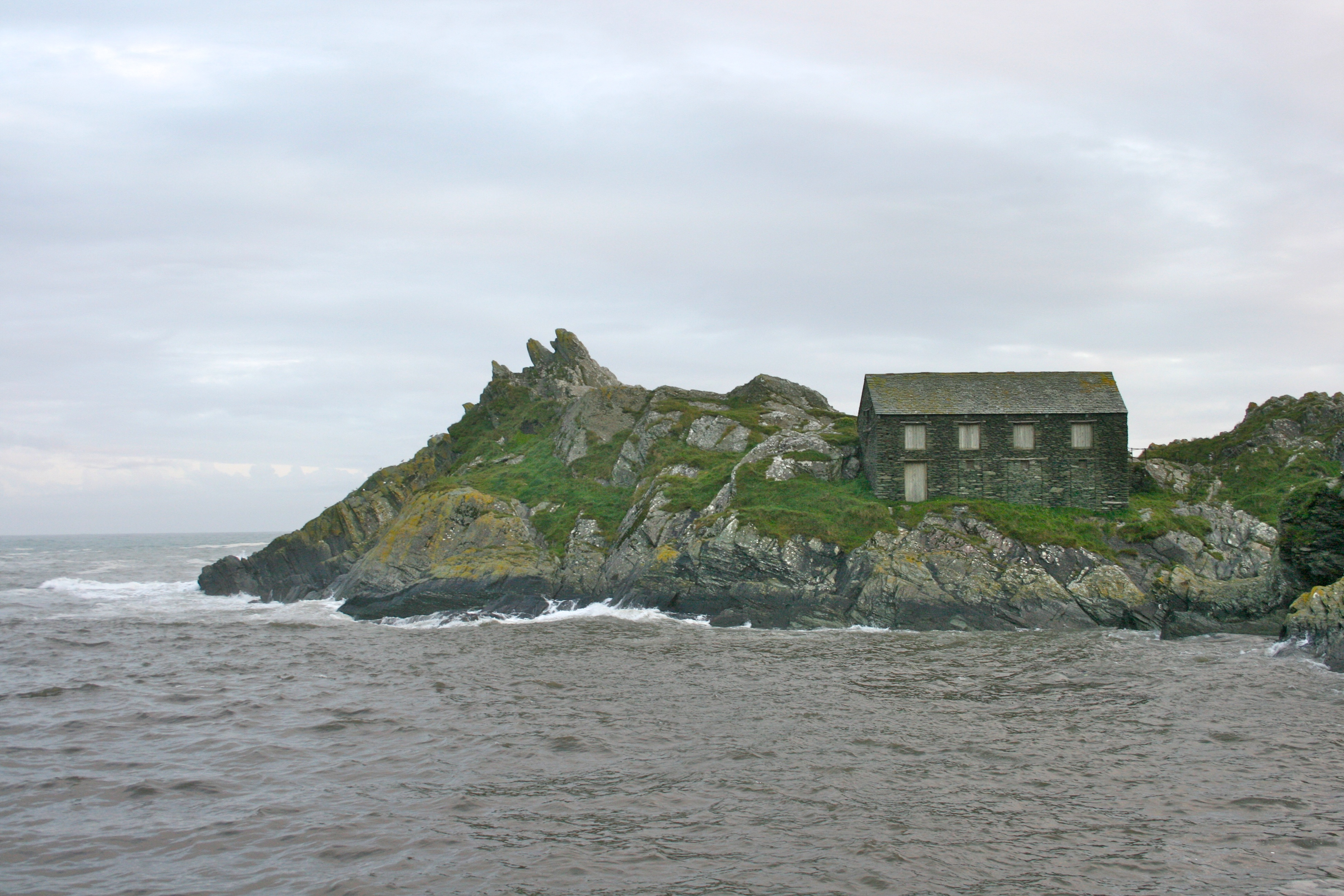
The Net Loft on Peak Rock, Polperro Harbour

The building is modest and functional, constructed of local stone and typical of harbour‑side vernacular architecture. It features a simple rectangular shape with upper‑floor access, large wooden doors facing the harbour, and minimal ornamentation. Its prominent position on a rocky outcrop makes it a distinctive element of the Polperro coastline. The Net Loft was listed Grade II* for its "special architectural or historic interest" on 26 March 1986.

== Location and access ==
The Net Loft is located at the entrance to Polperro Harbour, part of the South West Coast Path, approximately 4 miles west of Looe and 11 km east of Fowey. It is commonly accessed on foot by walkers exploring the harbour headlands.

== See also ==
- Polperro
- South West Coast Path
