= Richard Quiller Couch =

British naturalist

- Born: 14 March 1816; Polperro, Cornwall
- Died: 8 May 1863 (aged 47)
- Education: Guy's Hospital
- Scientific career
- Fields: Zoology, geology, occupational diseases
- Workplaces: RCPS, RGSC, PNHAS

Richard Quiller Couch, (14 March 1816 – 8 May 1863), British naturalist, eldest son of Jonathan Couch, was born at Polperro, Cornwall, UK on 14 March 1816. After receiving a medical education under his father and at Guy's Hospital, London, where he gained several honours and prizes and obtained the ordinary medical qualifications, he returned to Polperro to assist his father, and employed his leisure in careful zoological study.

== Zoology ==
In 1845 he settled in Penzance as a medical practitioner, and in a few years became recognised as an able zoological observer. Within a few weeks of his arrival at Penzance he was elected one of the secretaries and curators of the Penzance Natural History and Antiquarian Society, and he was for many years its president. His interesting annual addresses and many other papers on zoology by him are published in the Transactions of that society, vols. i. and ii. He contributed the third part (on the zoophytes) to the Cornish Fauna, written by his father; and an account of the natural history of West Cornwall to J. S. Courtney's Guide to Penzance, 1845. Other interesting papers on zoophytes, crustacea, and fishes were contributed by him to the Journal of the Royal Institution of Cornwall, the Reports of the Royal Cornwall Polytechnic Society, The Zoologist, Annals of Natural History, &c., all of which are recorded in Boase and Courtney's Bibliotheca Cornubiensis, i. 92–4, iii. 1138. Among these may be mentioned observations on the zoophytes of Cornwall, on the development of the frog, on the metamorphosis of the decapod crustaceans, and the natural history of the mackerel in the Polytechnic Reports for 1842 and 1844; and on the nest of the fifteen-spined stickleback in the Penzance Natural History Transactions, ii. 79–83. He contributed to John Ralfs's British Desmidieæ, 1848, and to Thomas Bell's British Stalk-eyed Crustacea, 1853.

== Geology ==
Couch was also interested in Cornish geology, and did useful work in developing the difficult subject of Cornish fossil remains. From 1848 onwards he was curator of the Royal Geological Society of Cornwall, and contributed to its Transactions several valuable papers, as well as annual reports. The diseases of the Cornish miners were a subject of his careful investigation, and his papers on the mortality of miners in the Polytechnic Reports (1857–60) are, as far as they go, of permanent value; they were translated into French. Couch's recordings of the statistical mortality of miners were made in the districts of Lelant, St Just, St Ives, Marazion and Buryan. Richard would likely have also been motivated to produce these reports in response to the faulty nature of many official reports at the time.

== Death ==
Couch died, in the full vigour of his powers, on 8 May 1863, aged 47, leaving a widow and four children.
