= St Ildierna's Church, Lansallos =

St Ildierna’s Church, Lansallos
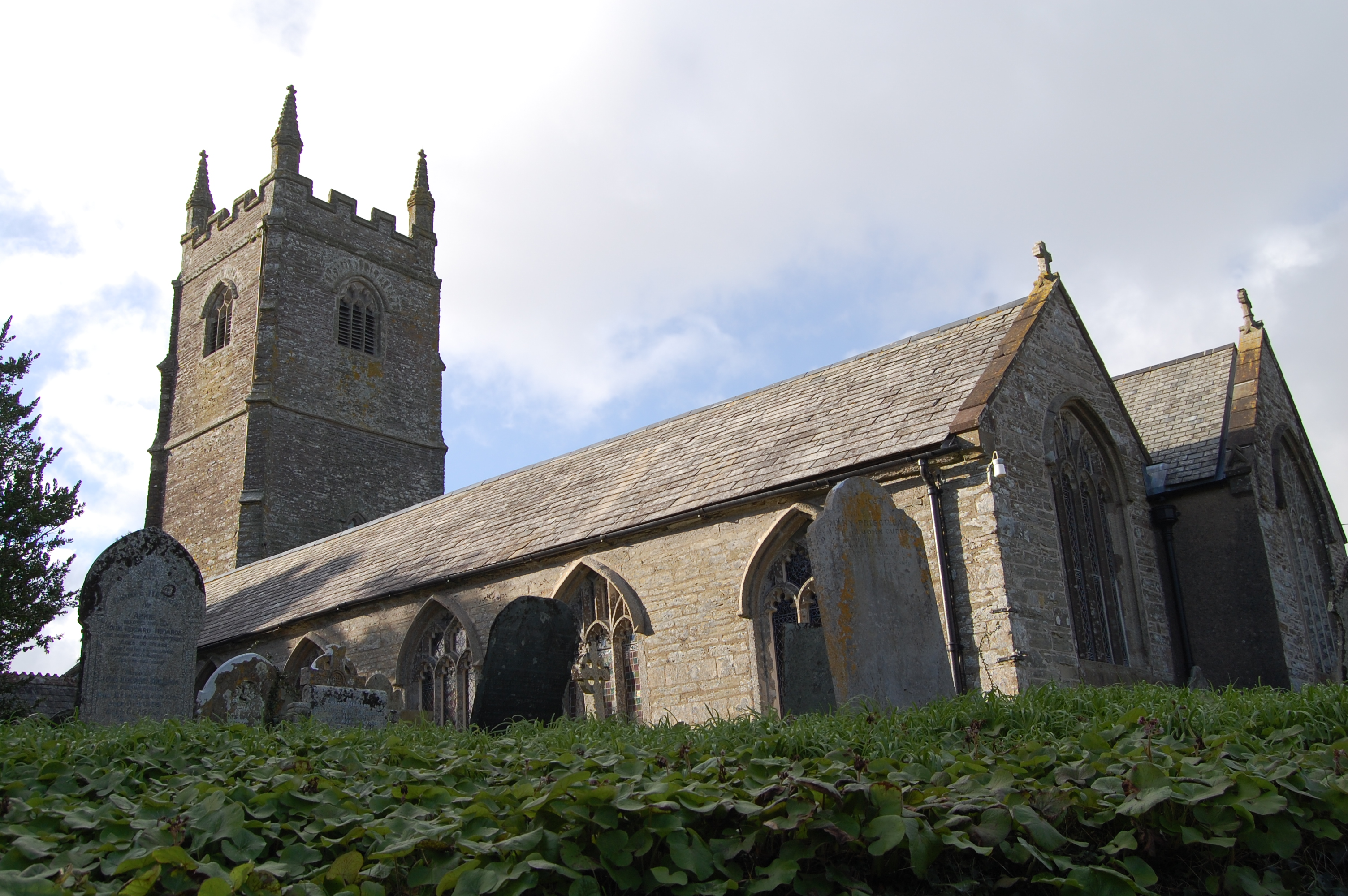
- St Ildierna’s Church, Lansallos
- St Ildierna’s Church, Lansallos
- 50°20′8.2″N 4°34′9.9″W
- Location: Lansallos
- Country: England
- Denomination: Church of England
- Churchmanship: Broad church

History
- Dedication: St Ildierna

Architecture
- Designated: 1331

Administration
- Province: Province of Canterbury
- Diocese: Diocese of Truro
- Archdeaconry: Bodmin
- Deanery: West Wivelshire
- Parish: Lansallos
- Location within Cornwall

Listed Building – Grade I
- Official name: Church of St Ildierna
- Designated: 21 August 1964
- Reference no.: 1365628

St Ildierna's Church, Lansallos is a Grade I listed parish church in the Church of England in Lansallos, Cornwall, built in the early 14th century. The church is noted for its 16th-century benches and bench ends. Serious damage was caused to the church, especially the roof, by a fire in 2005.

== History ==
The church dates from 1331 when it was dedicated. The 15th-century chronicler William Worcester, when visiting Fowey, recorded that the church contained the remains of St Hyldren, reputedly a bishop; however documentary evidence indicates that the parish patron saint was female. St Hyldren's feast was February 1. The advowson was a rectory formerly belonging to the Hywysche family whose seat at "Rathwylle" (Raphael) had its own chapel, mentioned in 1332.

The church was restored in 1883–84 and again in the early 20th century by Edmund Harold Sedding, while the peal of eight bells was installed in 1938 by the then rector, the Reverend N Rivers-Tippett.

The church's features of interest include the good carved wagon roofs, the square Norman font ornamented with a "tree of life", 16th-century benches and bench ends, of which 34 remain, and its Jacobean vestment cupboards.

A rare contemporary slate memorial tablet survives, commemorating Margaret Smith (died 1579) and the work of the stonemason Peter Crocker.

In 2005 a fire started in the northern aisle of the church, causing serious damage to the building.

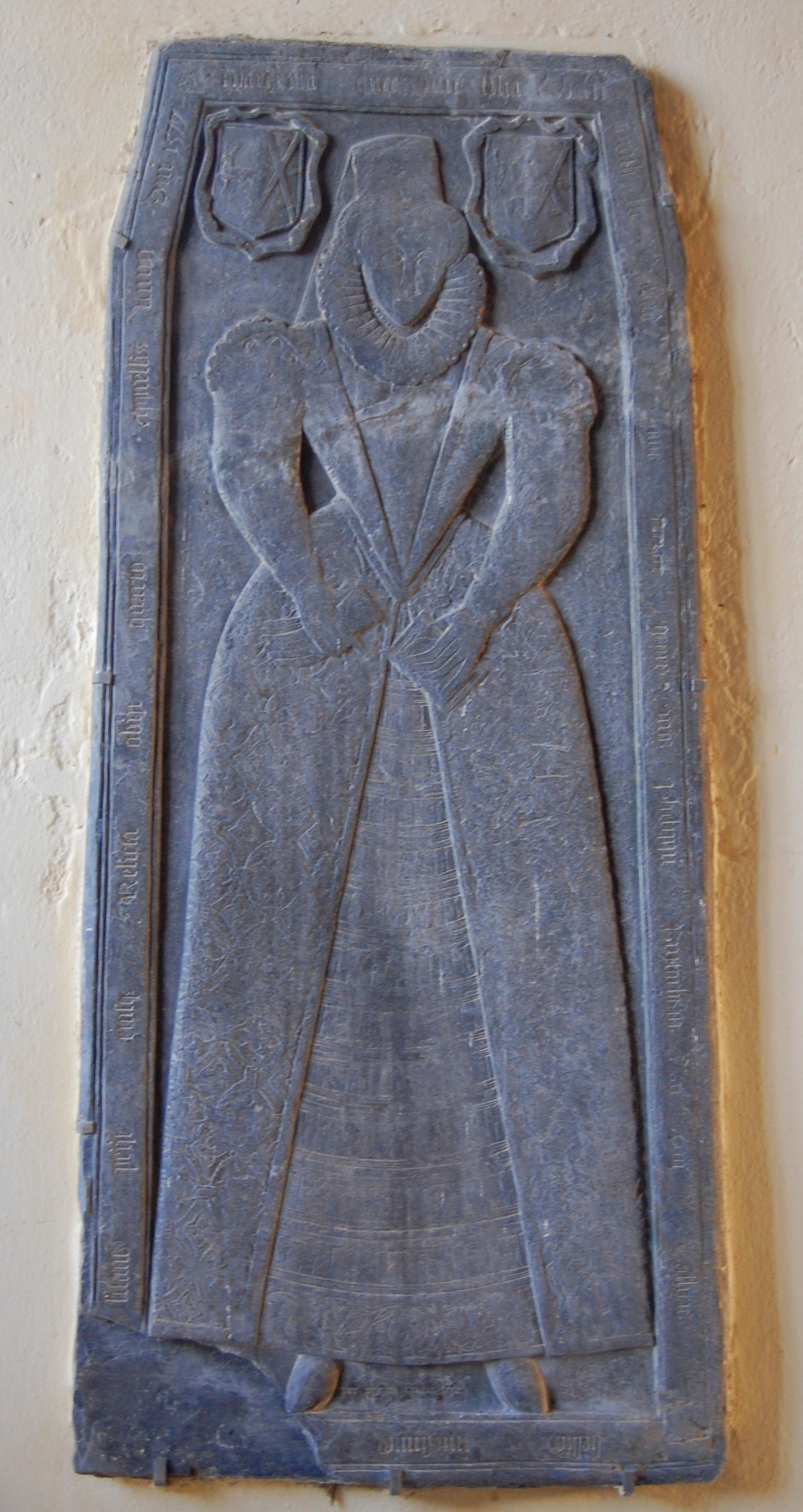
Margaret Smith memorial by stonemason Peter Crocker

== Organ ==
The organ by Heard and Son is no longer present in the church. A specification of the organ can be found on the National Pipe Organ Register.

== Gallery ==
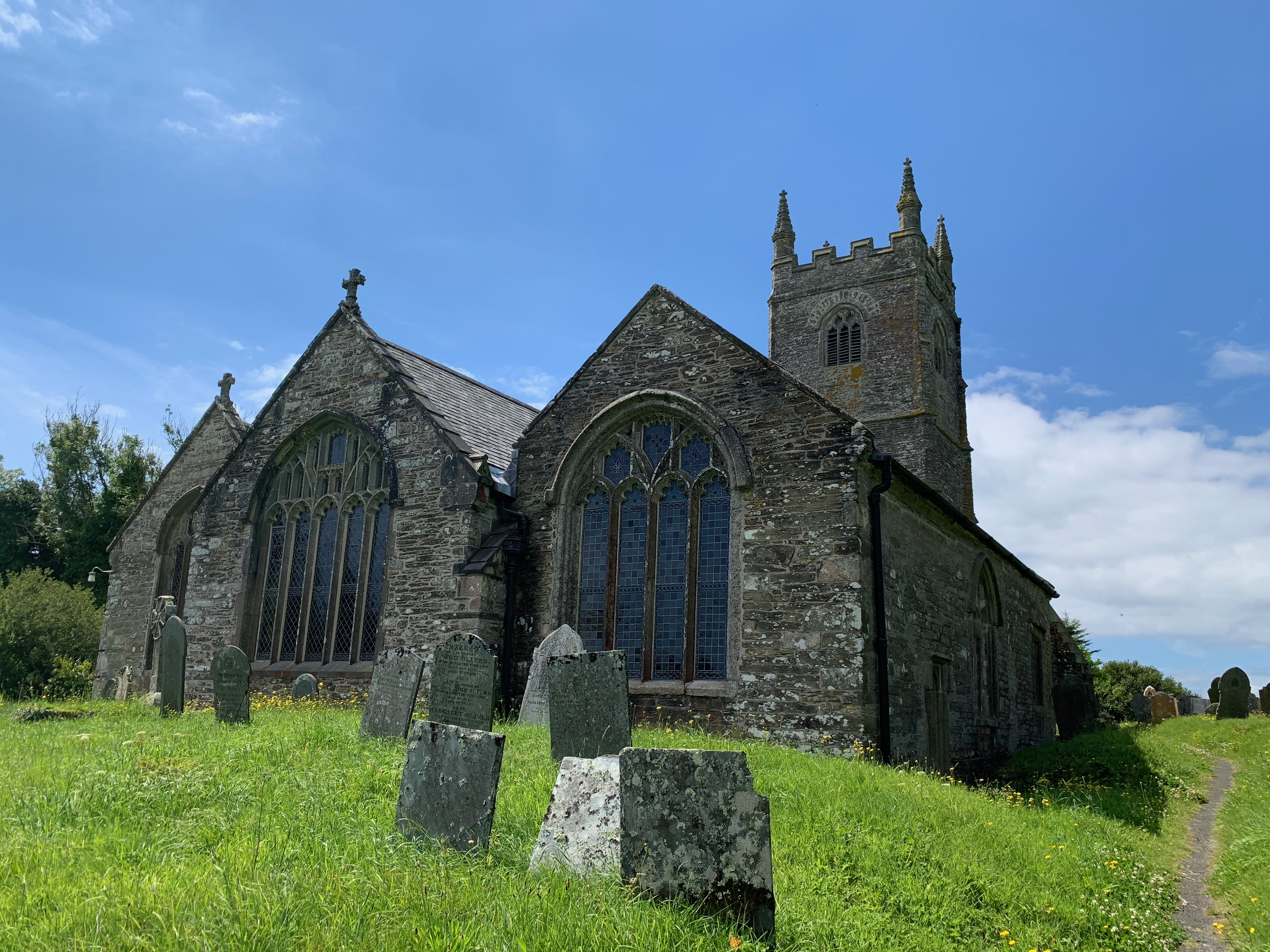
Exterior View

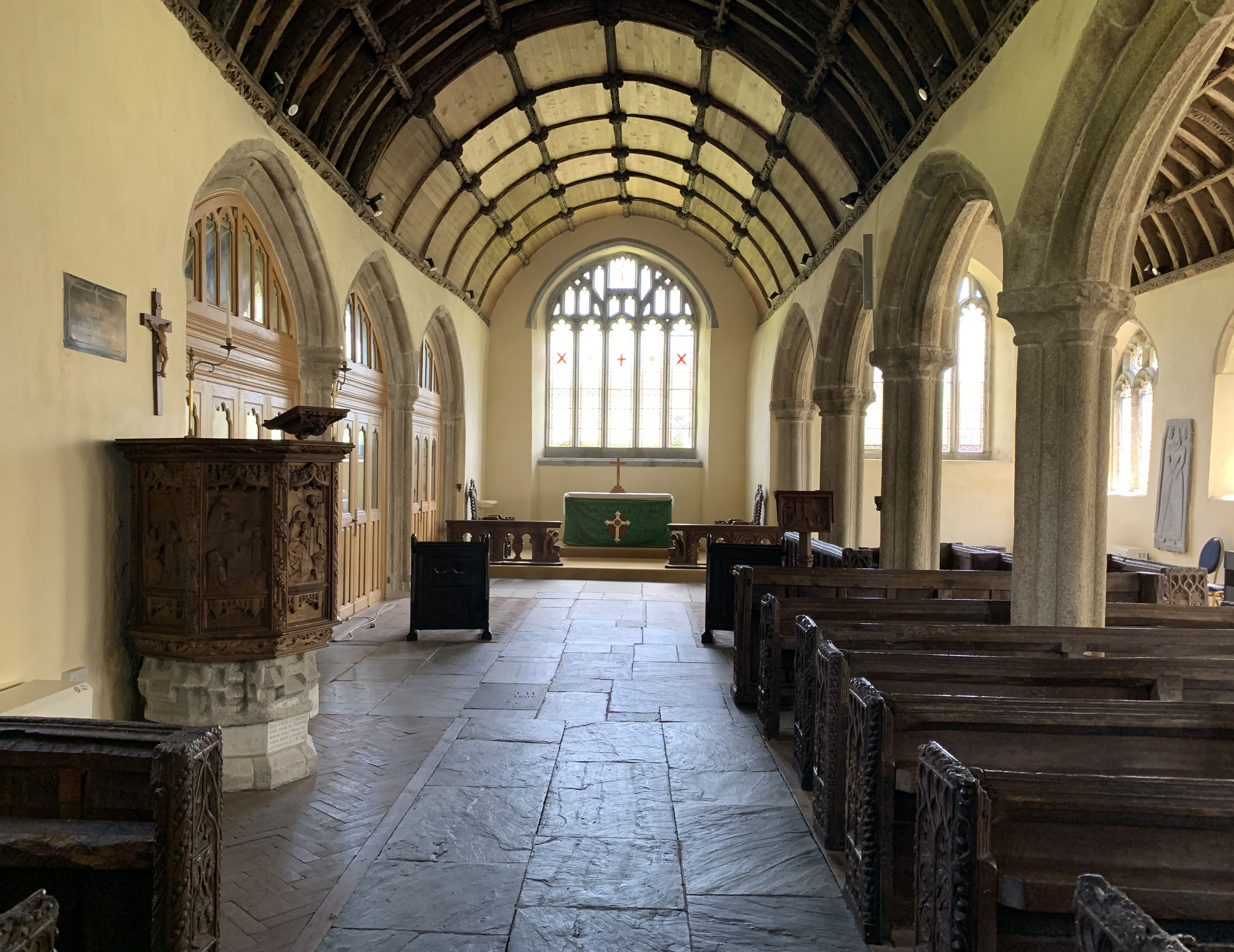
St Ildierna's Church, Lansallos, Interior

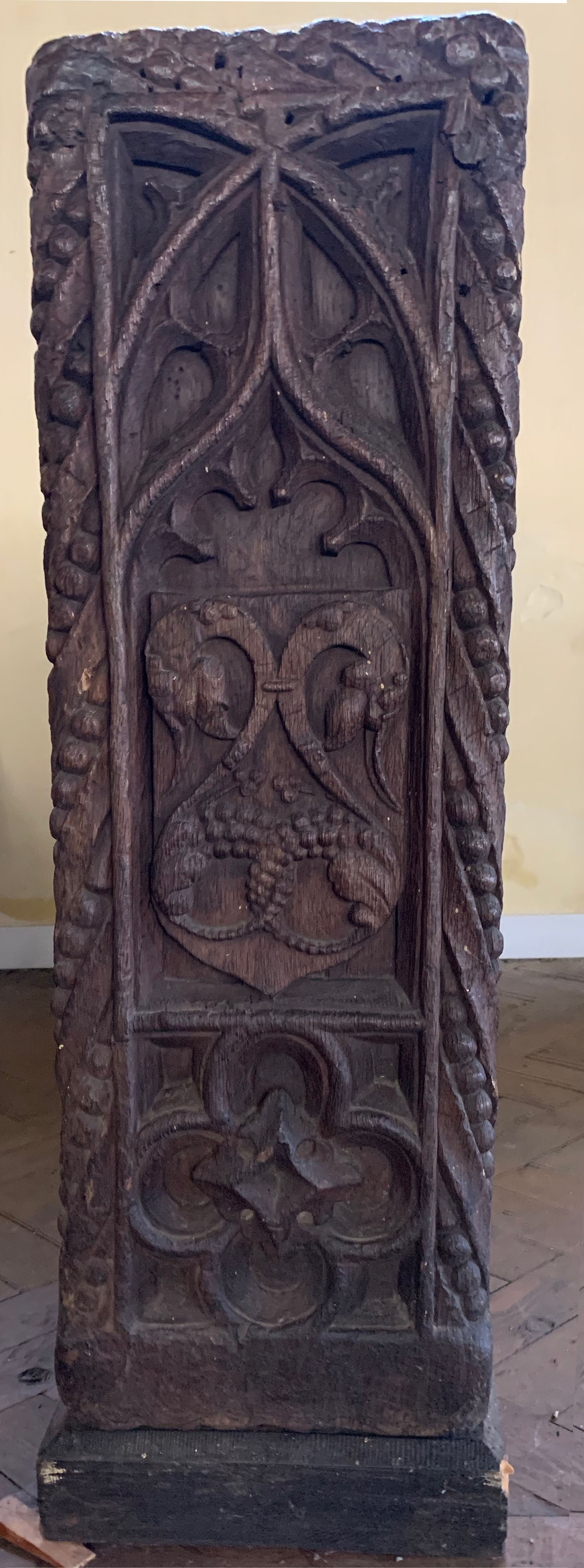
16th-century Bench End

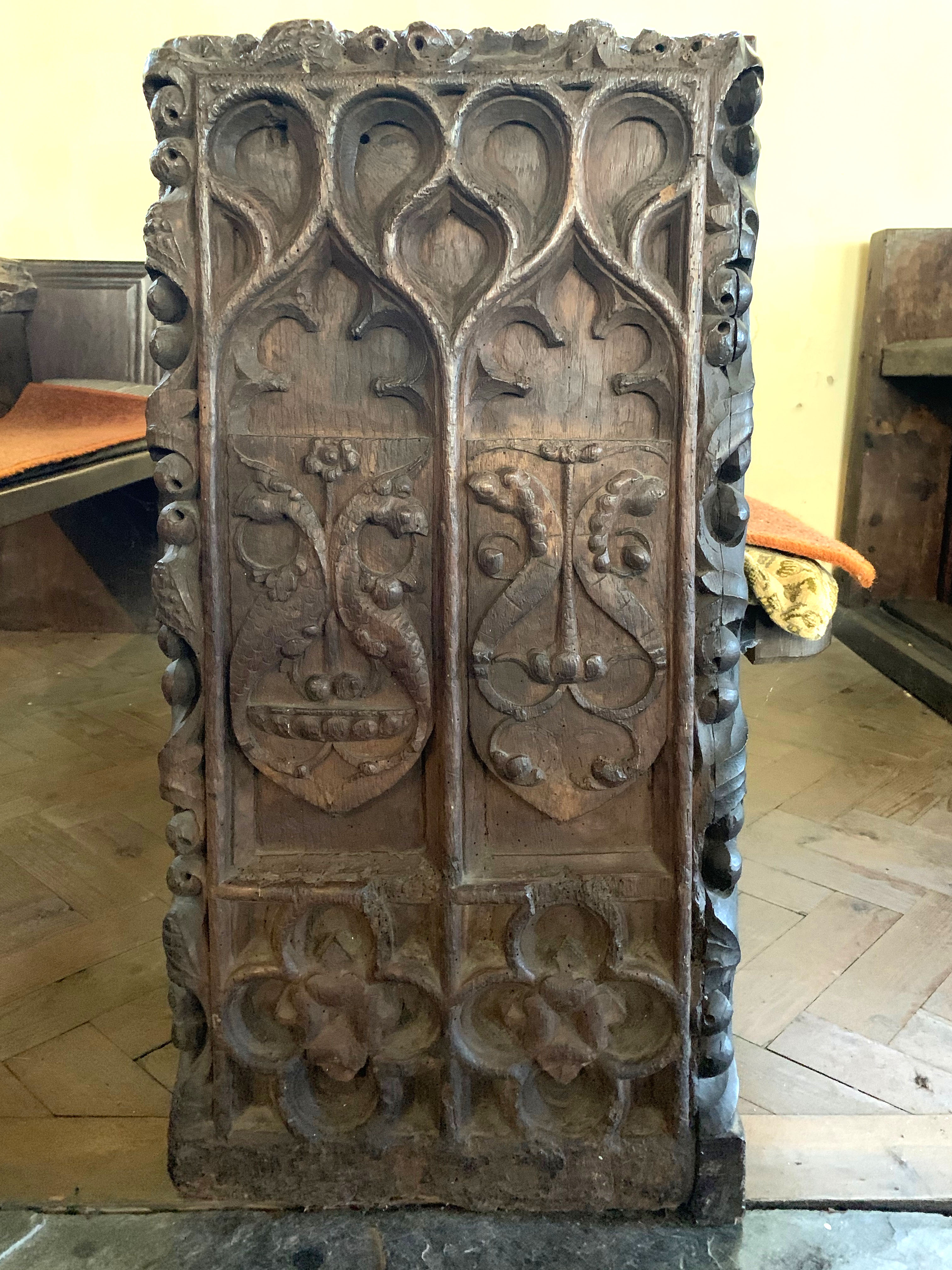
16th-century Bench End

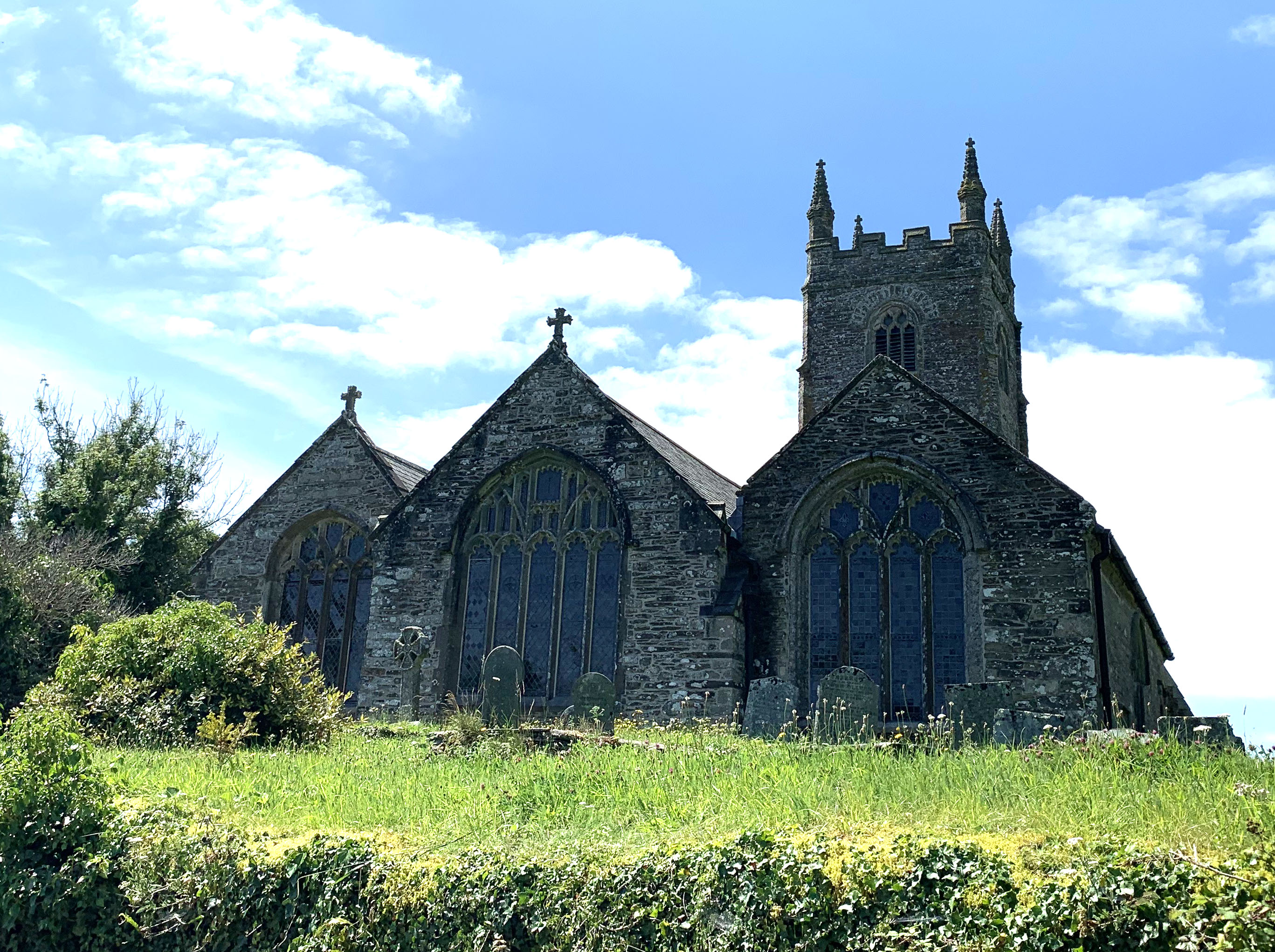
St Ildierna's Church, Lansallos, Exterior View
