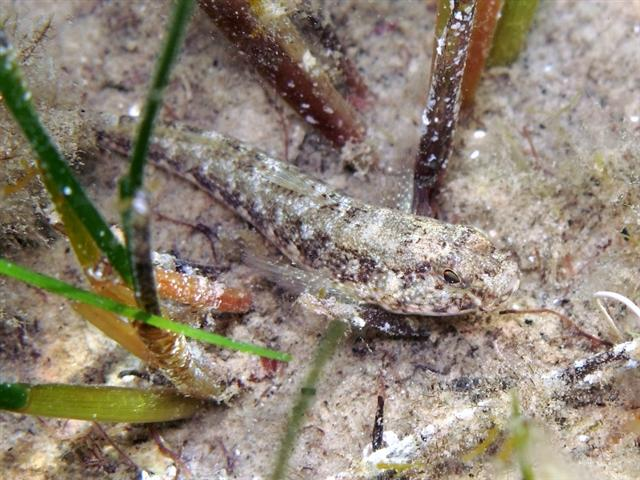

Conservation status
- Least Concern (IUCN 3.1)

Scientific classification
- Kingdom: Animalia
- Phylum: Chordata
- Class: Actinopterygii
- Order: Gobiiformes
- Family: Gobiidae
- Genus: Gobius
- Species: G. couchi

Binomial name
- Gobius couchi P. J. Miller & El-Tawil, 1974

= Couch's goby =

Species of fish

Couch's goby (Gobius couchi) is a species of goby native to the northeastern Atlantic Ocean as far north as southern Great Britain and Ireland, the Mediterranean Sea and the Adriatic Sea where it can be found living under stones on muddy sand in inshore waters and in the intertidal zone. This species can reach a length of 7.7 centimetres (3.0 in) TL. The specific name and common name both honour Jonathan Couch (1789–1870), the Cornish ichthyologist and the author of A History of the Fishes of the British Islands published between 1862 and 1867.
