= Talland Bay =

Coastal feature in Cornwall, England

Coordinates: 50.3372°N 4.4973°W

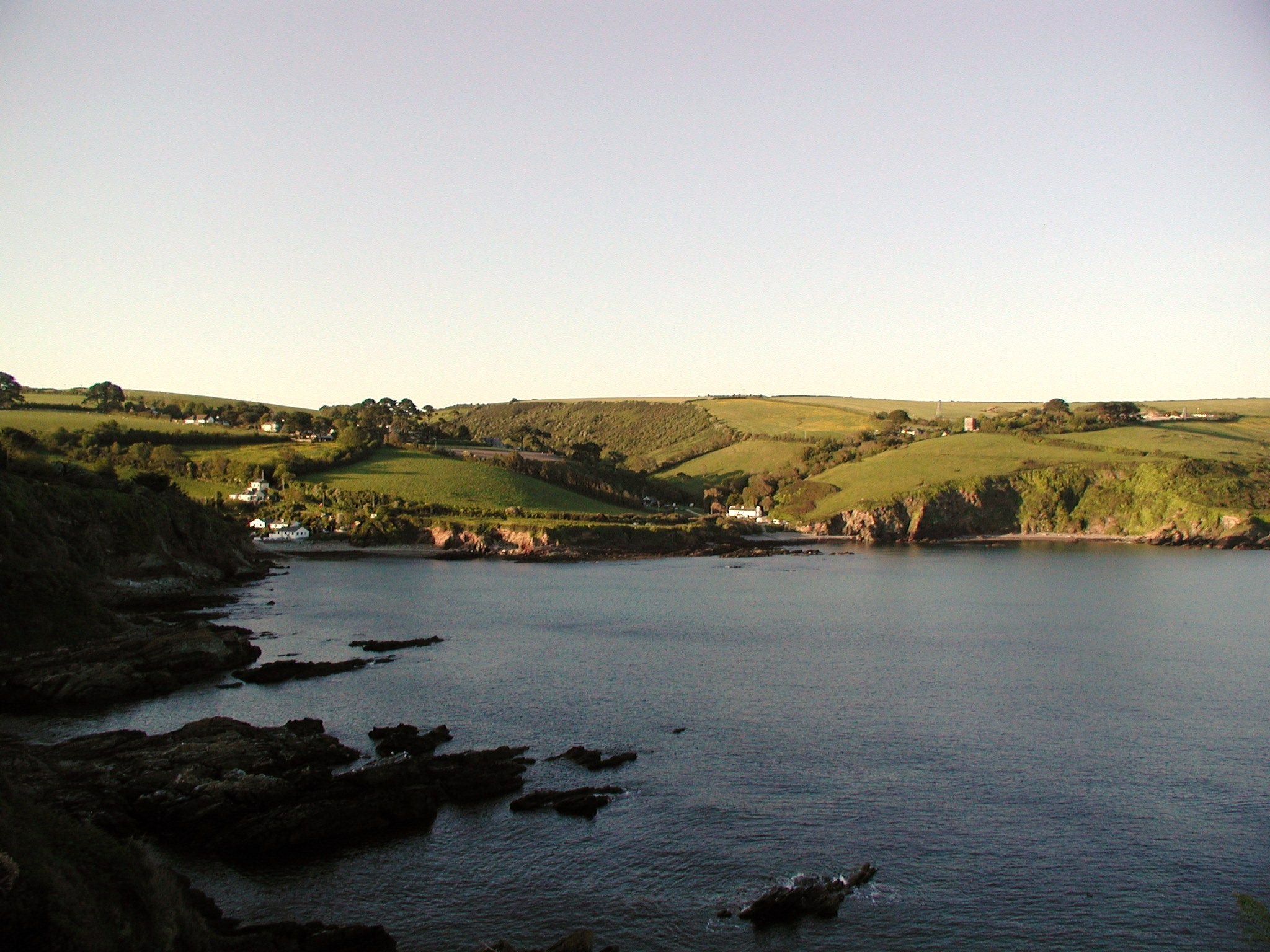
View of the bay from the west

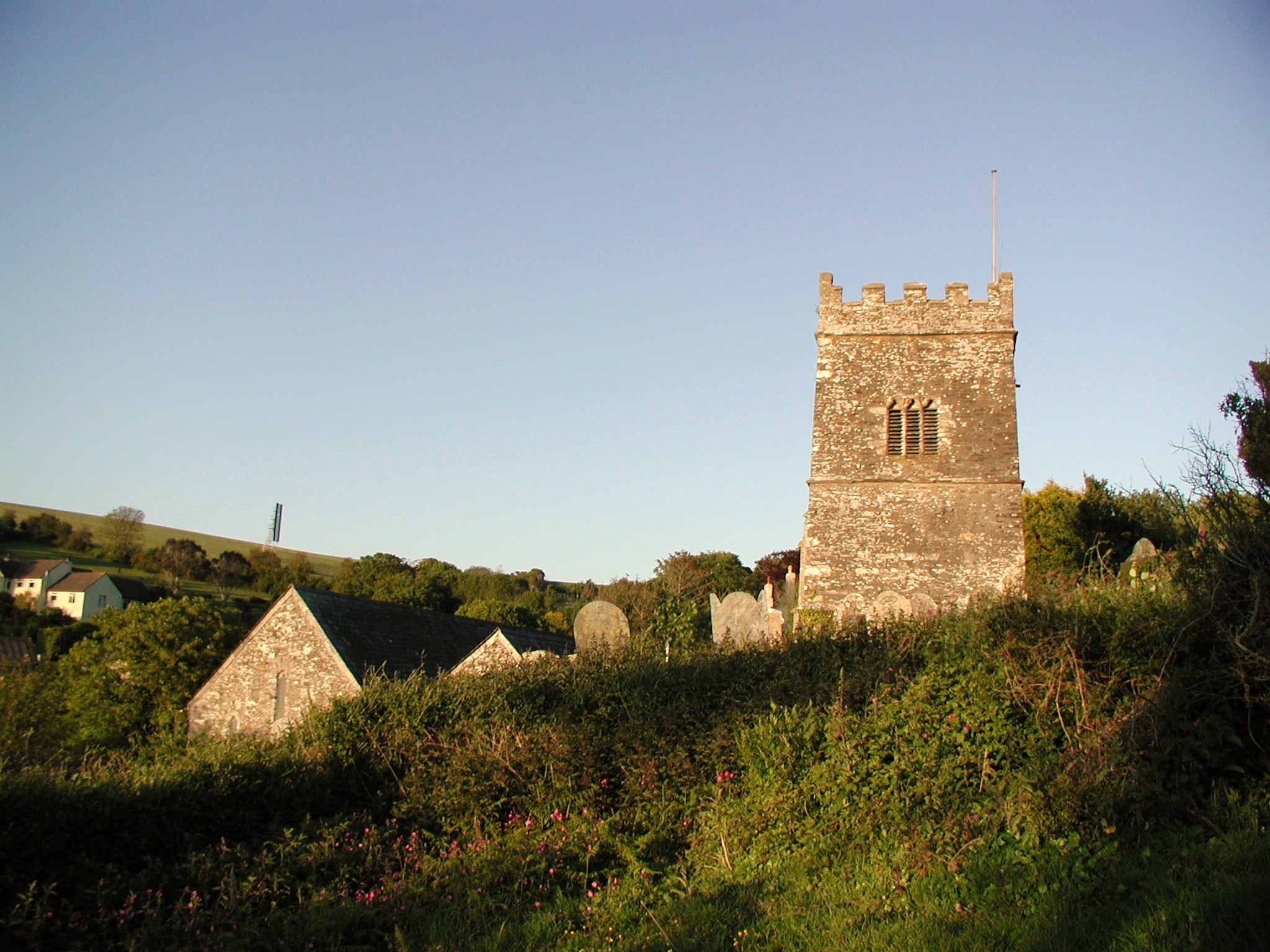
Talland Church

Talland Bay (Cornish: Porth Tallan) is located west of the town of Looe in Cornwall. On Talland Bay are two sheltered shingle beaches, Talland Sand and Rotterdam Beach. To the west of Talland Bay is Lekerock Cove.

== History ==
Talland Bay was once well known as a landing spot for smugglers. It has also been the scene of many shipwrecks including that of a French trawler, the Marguerite, in March 1922. Two private boats performed a dramatic rescue and all 21 people were saved. The remains of the ship's boiler can still be clearly seen on the beach at low tide.

The hamlet of Talland with Talland Parish Church is nearby. Celebrity couple Richard Madeley and Judy Finnigan have a home in Talland Bay, There are several nautical measured miles around the British Isles including the mile between Talland Bay and Hannafore.

== Landscape and development ==
The area is one of the most unspoiled sections of the south west coast and is both a designated Area of Outstanding Beauty and a Heritage Coast, but in October 2007, Caradon District Council granted planning permission for a controversial development of 40 new homes costing between £285,000 and £350,000 after more than 100 local people lodged their objections.
