= St Tallanus' Church, Talland =

Church in Cornwall, England

Coordinates: 50°20′N 4°29′W

Talland Church
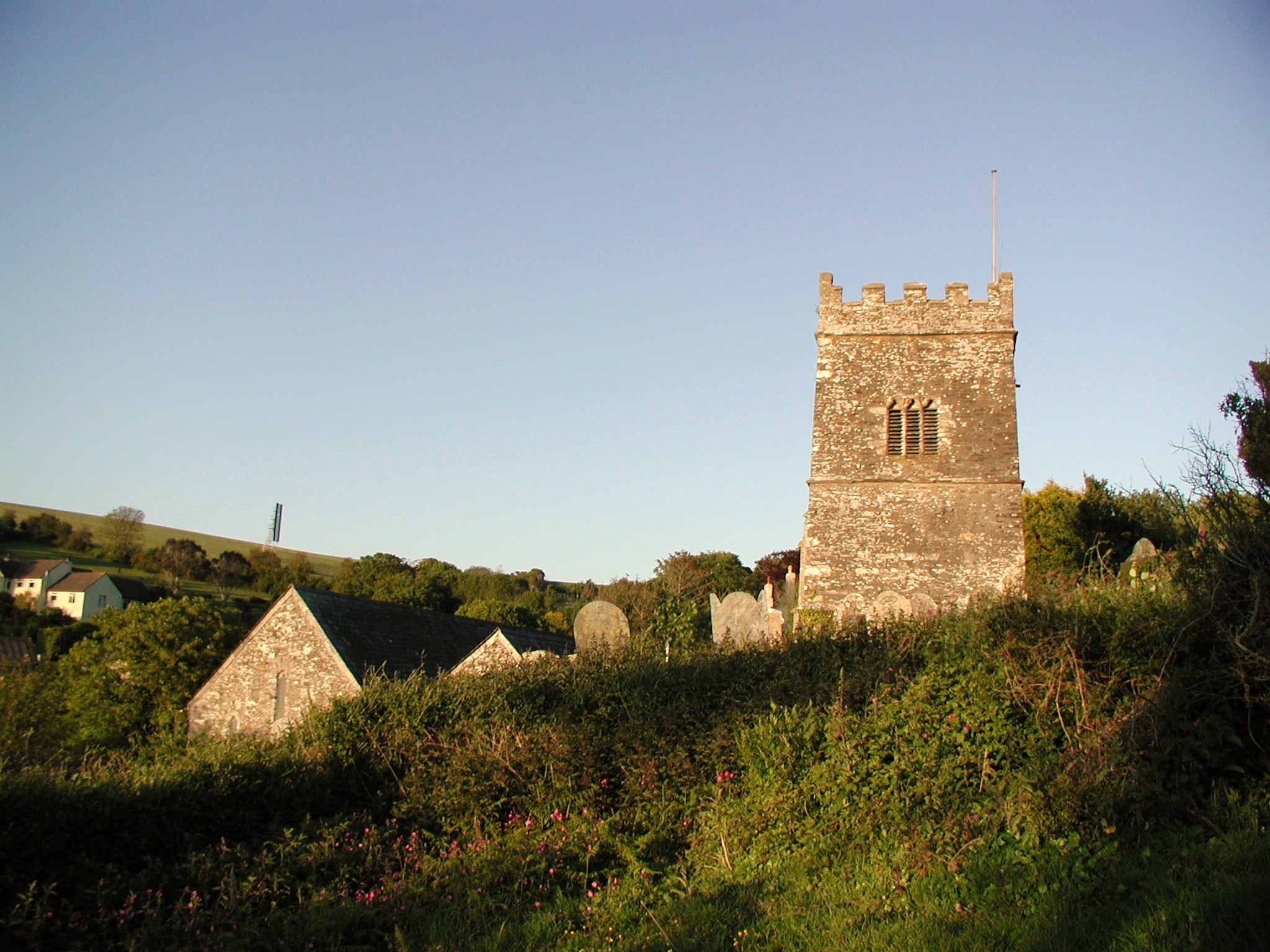
- Talland Church
- Talland Church
- Denomination: Church of England
- Churchmanship: Broad Church
- Website: https://www.tallandchurch.co.uk

History
- Dedication: St Tallan

Administration
- Province: Canterbury
- Diocese: Truro
- Archdeaconry: Bodmin
- Deanery: West Wivelshire
- Parish: Talland

Clergy
- Rector: Reverend Richard Allen
- Location within Cornwall

Listed Building – Grade I
- Official name: Church of St Tallanus
- Designated: 21 August 1964
- Reference no.: 1140743

Talland Church is a Grade I listed building located on the cliff-top at Talland near Looe in Cornwall. It is dedicated to St Tallanus and was built by Augustinian monks from Launceston.

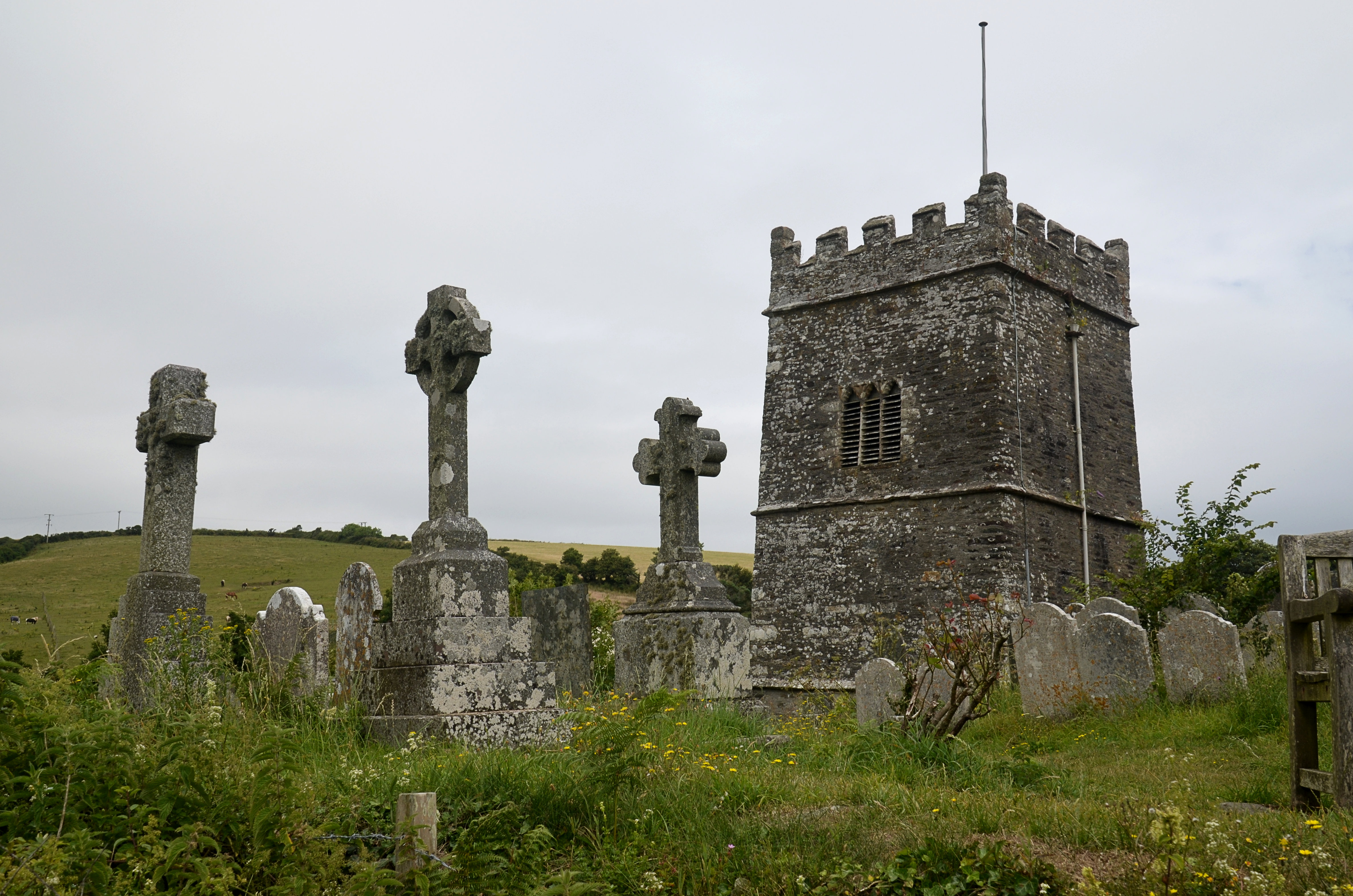
The church tower and the churchyard

The altar of the present-day church is situated on the site of the original Celtic altar. The altar of the church is said to date from the time of Tallan and was built at the junction of ley lines. However, St Tallanus's existence is disputed and ley lines cannot be proved to exist either. The church celebrated its 500th anniversary in 1990.

Part of the nave and the first stage of the tower probably remain from a 13th-century church: the remainder must be late 15th century and is in typical Cornish Perpendicular style. Unusually it has a detached bell-tower on the south side which was only joined to the main body of the church in the 15th century. Inside the church is the headstone of Robert Mark although there is some confusion over exactly who he was. Killed in 1802, some accounts say that he was a Polperro smuggler shot at sea, others that he was a revenue collector killed on duty. His tablet reads: "In prime of life, most suddenly, Sad tidings to relate, Here view my utter destiny, And pity my sad state. I by a shot which rapid flew, Was instantly struck dead." There is old woodwork in the fine wagon roofs and the many benchends (partly ca. 1520, the rest ca. 1600) are of the usual Cornish type and among the finer examples of these.
