= Trenewan =

Hamlet in Cornwall, England

Coordinates: 50°21′5″N 4°34′5″W

Trenewan (Cornish: Trenewyen) is a hamlet in Cornwall, England, United Kingdom, about a mile north of Lansallos.
