= Lansallos =

Village in Cornwall, England

Coordinates: 50.336°N 4.568°W

Lansallos: Cornish: Lannsalwys
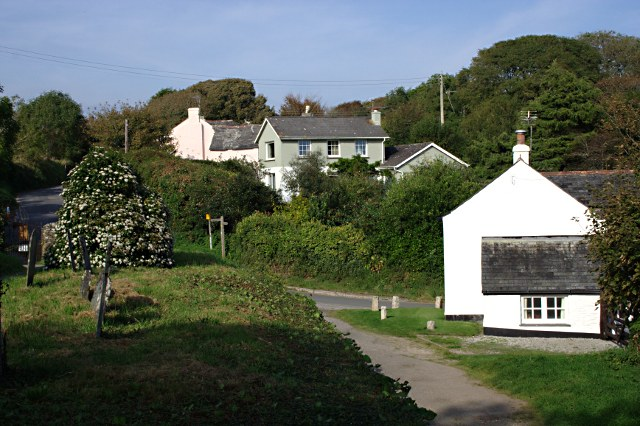

- Location within Cornwall
- OS grid reference: SX173516
- Civil parish: Polperro
- Unitary authority: Cornwall
- Ceremonial county: Cornwall
- Region: South West
- Country: England
- Sovereign state: United Kingdom
- Post town: Looe
- Postcode district: PL13
- Dialling code: 01503
- Police: Devon and Cornwall
- Fire: Cornwall
- Ambulance: South Western
- UK Parliament: South East Cornwall

Lansallos (Latin: Lansalux; Cornish: Lannsalwys, meaning St Salwys' church) is a village in the civil parish of Polperro in south Cornwall, England, United Kingdom. It is situated between Polruan and Polperro about 5 miles (8.0 km) east of Fowey. Historically, it was in Liskeard registration district.

A short distance south of the village is Lansallos beach, on the South West Coast Path and English Channel.

Lansallos forms an ecclesiastical parish, including the hamlets of Landaviddy and Raphael. The ecclesiastical parish is nowadays combined with Talland, its neighbour to the east, forming a joint benefice.

== History and notable buildings ==
Lansallos is mentioned in the Domesday Book (1086) as the manor of Lansalhas; it was one of 28 manors held by Richard from Robert, Count of Mortain. There was one hide of land and land for 5 ploughs. There were 2 ploughs, 3 serfs, 2 villeins and 2 smallholders. There were 30 acres of pasture, 34 sheep and 11 other beasts. The value of the manor was 10 shillings.

Lansallos takes its name from a monastery dedicated to St Salwys: this ancient parish has an ecclesiastical Rector, whose church is dedicated to St Ildierna (in Latin: Sanctus Heldrenus), situated in the historic village at OS Grid ref SX172515.

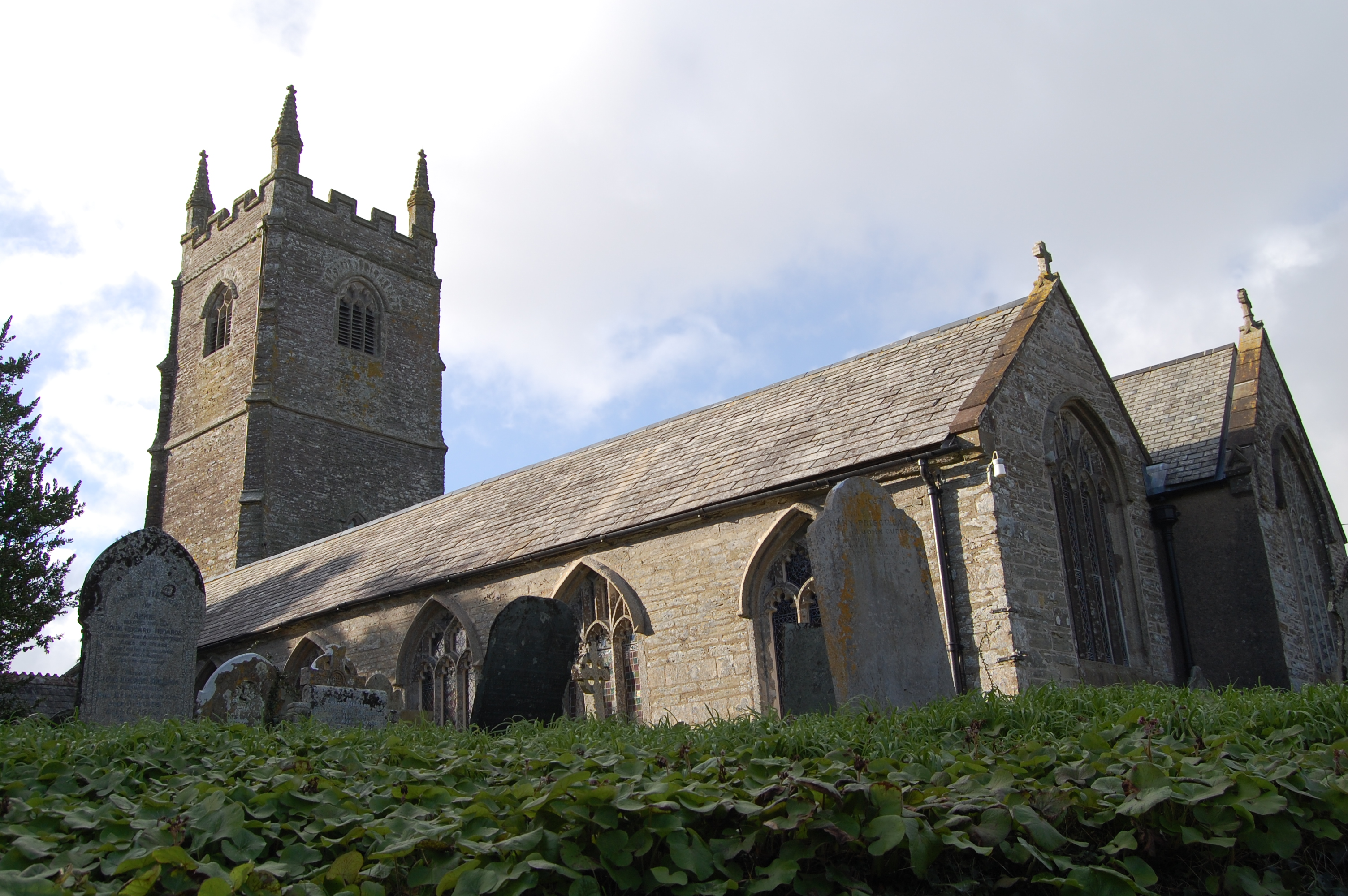
Lansallos Church

Lansallos parish church as it exists today was built in the 15th century and consists of a chancel, nave of six bays, north and south aisles (the north aisle is incomplete and ends with a pre-existing north transept wall), south porch and west tower. This building was preceded by a Norman church and its rededication is recorded in 1321. The chronicler William Worcester, when visiting Fowey, recorded that the church contained the remains of St Hyldren, reputedly a bishop; however documentary evidence indicates that the parish patron saint was female. St Hyldren's feast was February 1. The advowson was a rectory formerly belonging to the Hywysche family whose seat at "Rathwylle" (Raphael) had its own chapel, mentioned in 1332. The church's features of interest include the good carved wagon roofs, the square Norman font ornamented with a "tree of life", 16th-century benches and bench ends, of which 34 remain, and its Jacobean vestment cupboards. A rare contemporary slate memorial tablet survives commemorating Margaret Smith (died 1579), the work of the stonemason, Peter Crocker. In 2005 a fire started in the northern aisle of the church, causing serious damage to the building.

A track leads down from the village to Lansallos Cove. The base of the track has been cut through the slate rock and there are visible wheel ruts. This indicates track was heavily used, possibly to collect sand and seaweed to be used as fertiliser, and possibly for smuggling.

A cross now in the churchyard was mentioned by Arthur Langdon (1896) as being in a field west of the churchyard. In 1919 the rector had it erected in the churchyard.

== See also ==
- List of monastic houses in Cornwall
