= Carey Park, Cornwall =

Hamlet in Cornwall, England

Coordinates: 50.3387°N 4.5116°W

Carey Park: Cornish: Park Carey
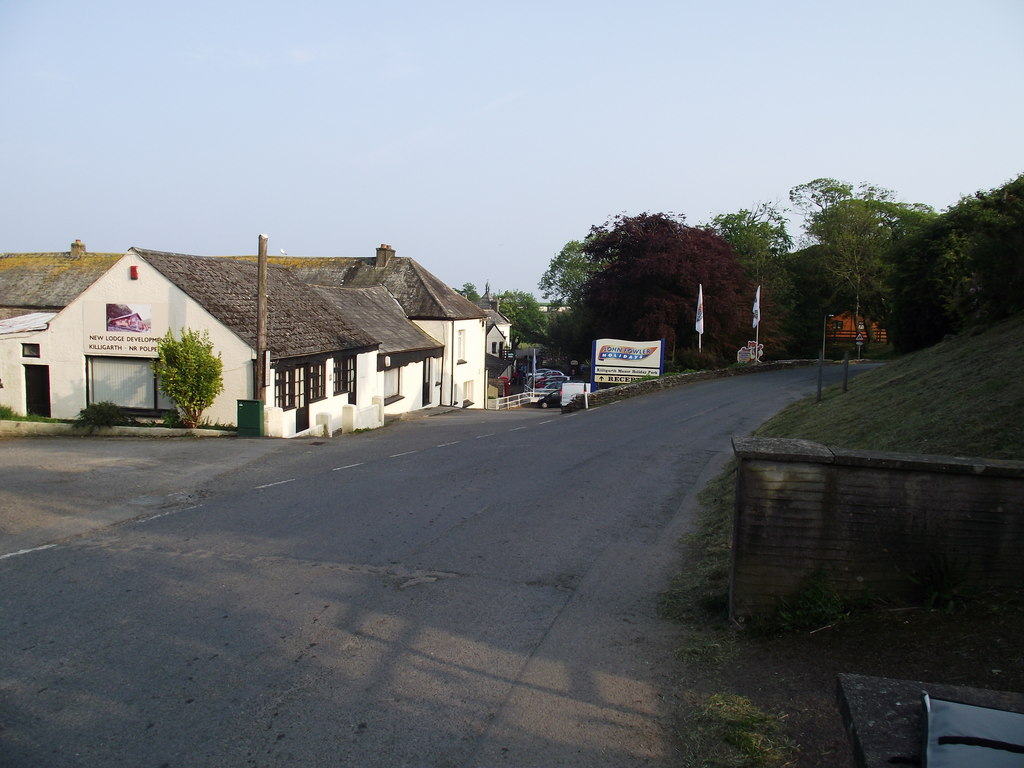

- Location within Cornwall
- Area: 0.3206 km^{2} (0.1238 sq mi)
- Population: 696 (2021 census)
  - Density: 2,171/km^{2} (5,620/sq mi)
- Civil parish: Polperro
- Unitary authority: Cornwall
- Shire county: Cornwall
- Region: South West
- Country: England
- Sovereign state: United Kingdom

Carey Park (Cornish: Park Carey) is a hamlet-estate in the civil parish of Polperro, in the Cornwall, in the ceremonial county of Cornwall, England. It is situated 600 metres (660 yd) northeast of the village of Polperro and 4 miles (6.4 km) west of the neighbouring town of Looe. In 2021 it had a population of 696.
