= Mixtow =

Coordinates: 50°20′49″N 4°37′48″W

- Hamlet
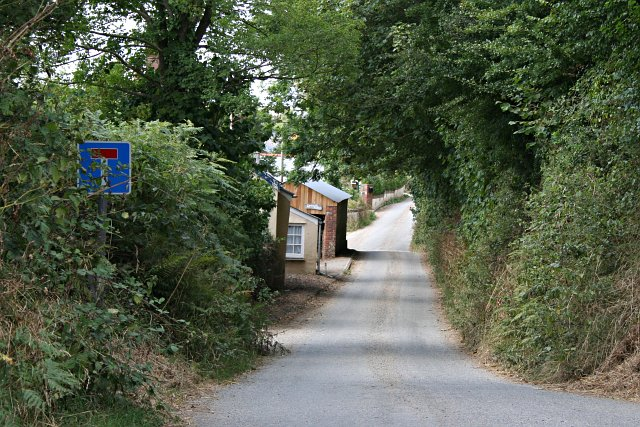
- The road to Mixtow

- Location within Cornwall
- OS grid reference: SX 1294 5301
- Civil parish: Lanteglos-by-Fowey
- Unitary authority: Cornwall
- Ceremonial county: Cornwall
- Region: South West
- Country: England
- Sovereign state: United Kingdom
- Post town: FOWEY
- Postcode district: PL23
- Dialling code: 01726
- Police: Devon and Cornwall
- Fire: Cornwall
- Ambulance: South Western
- UK Parliament: South East Cornwall

Mixtow is a hamlet in the Lanteglos-by-Fowey parish in south east Cornwall, England. It is located on the north side of an inlet off the River Fowey, opposite Fowey Docks.
