= Penzance Natural History and Antiquarian Society =

Former local society founded in Cornwall, England

Penzance Natural History and Antiquarian Society (1839–1961) was a local society founded in Penzance in Cornwall, England, UK, whose aim was "the cultivation of the science of Natural History, and for the investigation of the Antiquities referring to the early inhabitants."

== History ==
The Society was established at a public meeting on 20 November 1839, with an annual subscription of 10 shillings or life membership of £5. The society held meetings, where lectures were delivered and discussed, held an annual excursion to visit the antiquities of the area, and maintained a museum. Despite the initial enthusiasm, very little happened as the Secretaries and Curators' Report at the 1845 AGM concluded with "The society having somewhat revived from the torpor which has for some time hung over it, the council hopes that its increased energy will be continued without further interruption". The first volume of Reports and Transactions was finally published in 1851, covering the years 1845–51. Transactions continued with the publication of volume two in 1864 (covering the years 1851–55) and volume three in 1865 (the years 1862–65). The society then lay dormant apart from the annual excursions which continued until 1872 when it became defunct.

Fifty-three members joined the society after it was revived in June 1880 following a public meeting on 8 May. A petition, dated 26 April, had been made to the Mayor of Penzance, Charles Campbell Ross following concern that the museum had accumulated arrears of nearly £100 and was in danger of being sold. A new series of Reports and Transactions was published annually until 1890 and intermittently until 1899. The annual excursion and lectures continued into the 20th century and the 1935 AGM reported a membership of 160 and a credit balance of £55 10s 10d. The Penzance Natural History and Antiquarian Society ceased to exist in 1961.

== Museum ==
In 1839 the Museum was housed in the dome of the Market House, (now Lloyds Bank) and moved to the newly built public buildings, now known as St John's Hall, in 1867, where it joined the Royal Geological Society of Cornwall and the Penzance Library (later to become the Morrab Library). In 1961 the collection, which included local flora and fauna passed into the ownership of the Borough of Penzance and is now housed at Penlee House.

== List of presidents ==
- 1839–47 John Paynter, Esq.
- 1847–55 Joseph Carne, Esq, F.R.S.
- 1864–65 Thomas Simon Bolitho
- 1865–66 Rev M N Peters
- 1880–81 Charles Campbell Ross, M.P.
- 1881–82 William Copeland Borlase, Esq. F.S.A., M.P.
- 1882–83 Thomas Cornish, Esq.
- 1883–84 John Ralfs, Esq., M.R.C.S.
- 1884–85 Rev W. S. Lach-Szyrma, M.A.
- 1885–86 William Bolitho Jun., Esq.
- 1886–87 George Bown Millett, Esq. M.R.C.S.
- 1887–88 Thomas Cornish, Esq.
- 1888–89 Right Hon. Leonard Henry Courtney, M.P.
- 1889–90 Rev W. S. Lach-Szyrma, M.A
- 1890–91 William Bolitho Jun., Esq
- 1891-93 William Shepheard Bennett, M.R.C.S
- 1893–95 William E. Bailey, F.E.S., Esq.
- 1895–96 J D Enys
- 1896–97 F Holman
- 1897–98 A H Teague
- 1898–99 John Batten Cornish
- 1935– Dr R V Favell
- Day Perry LeGrice (1800–1881) of Trereife House was an original member and some time President.
