= Polperro =

Village in Cornwall, England

Coordinates: 50.3311°N 4.5197°W

Polperro: Cornish: Porthpyra
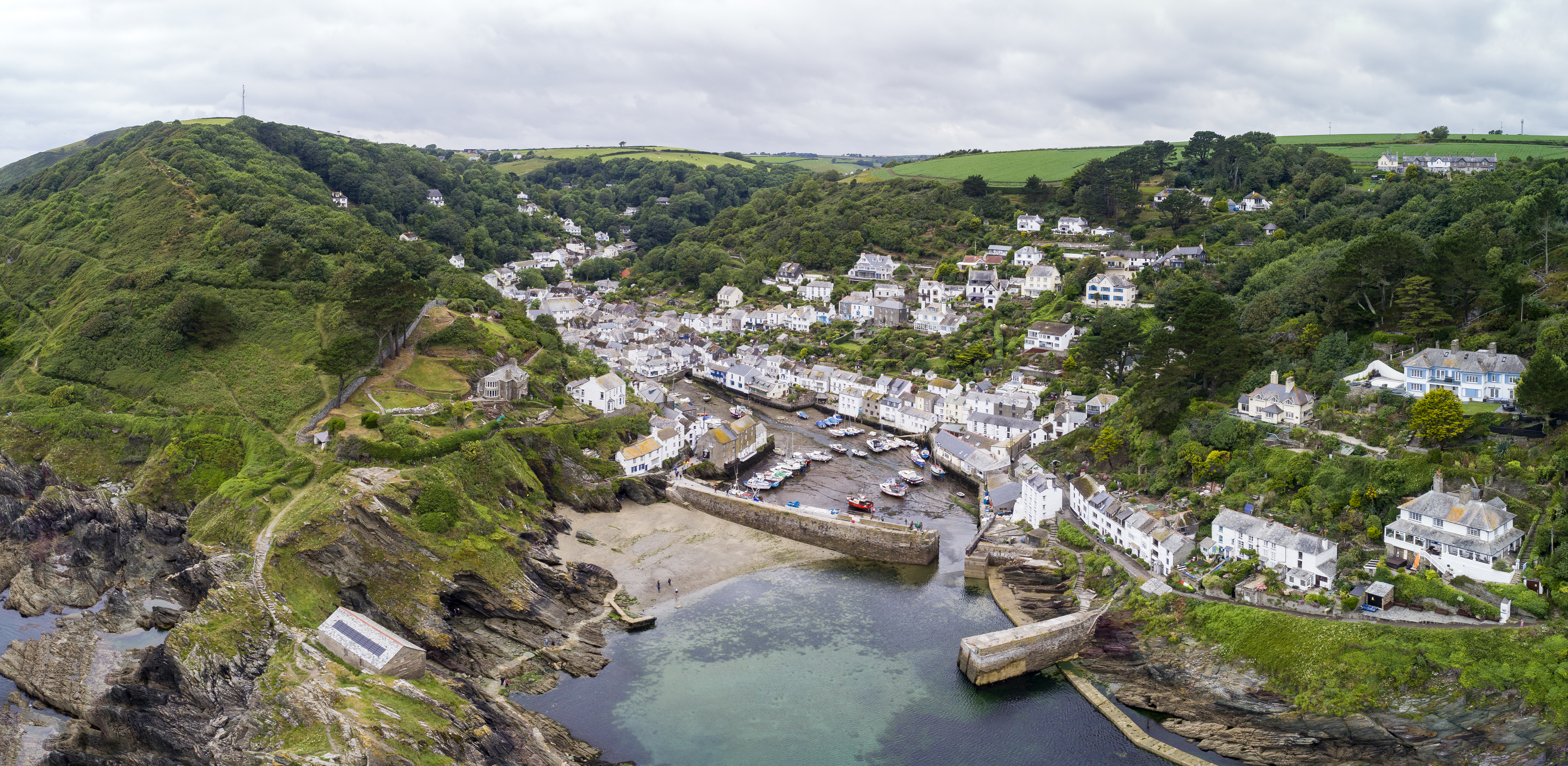

- Location within Cornwall
- Population: 1,615 (Parish, 2021)
- OS grid reference: SX207509
- Civil parish: Polperro
- Unitary authority: Cornwall
- Ceremonial county: Cornwall
- Region: South West
- Country: England
- Sovereign state: United Kingdom
- Post town: Looe
- Postcode district: PL13
- Dialling code: 01503
- Police: Devon and Cornwall
- Fire: Cornwall
- Ambulance: South Western
- UK Parliament: South East Cornwall

Polperro (Cornish: Porthpyra, meaning Pyra's cove) is a large village, civil parish, and fishing harbour within the Polperro Heritage Coastline in south Cornwall, England, United Kingdom. Its population is around 1,554.

Polperro, through which runs the River Pol, is 7 miles (11 km) east of Fowey and 4 miles (6 km) west of the neighbouring town of Looe and 25 miles (40 km) west of the major city and naval port of Plymouth. It is a noted tourist destination, particularly in the summer months, for its idyllic appearance with tightly-packed ancient fishermen's houses which survive almost untouched, its quaint harbour and attractive coastline.

== History ==
=== Toponymy ===
The name Polperro derives from the Cornish Porthpyra, meaning harbour named after Pyran. However Ekwall suggests that "Pyra" or "Pira" may not be a personal name and suggests that "Perro" could be a name for the stream. Early forms are Portpira, 1303, and Porpira, 1379. The chapel of St Peter de Porthpyre is mentioned in 1398 and the following forms are recorded from the reign of King Henry VIII: Polpyz explained as "fish-pool" (probably a literal error for Polpyr), Poulpirrhe, Poul Pier and Poulpyrre (in John Leland's account).

=== Early history ===
Polperro, since medieval times, fell under the jurisdiction of two ancient and separate manors, those of Raphael in the parish of Lansallos, west of the River Pol which runs through the middle of the village, and Killigarth to the east in the parish of Talland, mentioned in the Domesday Book.

As early as the 13th century Polperro was a recognised fishing settlement and its first known record is in a Royal Ordinance of 1303.

=== Later history ===
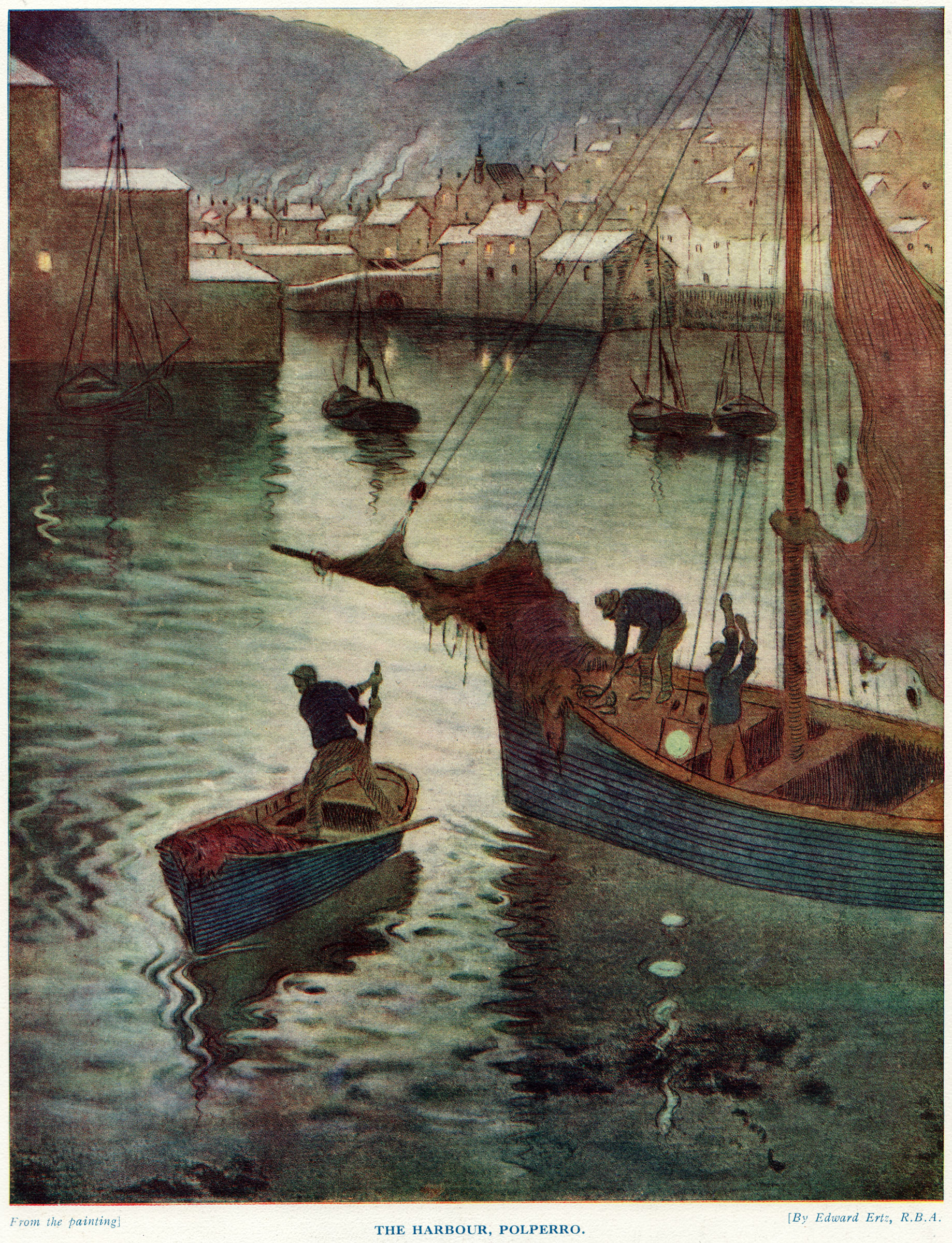
"The Harbour, Polperro" by Edward Frederick Ertz (full-page colour plate from: "Britain Beautiful". 4 vols. London: Hutchinson, 1924–26)

The date of the building of Polperro's older quay is uncertain but Jonathan Couch (writing in the mid-19th century) considered that it is either the one mentioned by John Leland (who wrote in the first half of the 16th century) or one built upon the same site. It was probably built under the patronage of the lord of the manor of Raphael who owned the harbour and its rights. Polperro's newer quay, also of unknown antiquity, is sited almost on an east-west alignment a little further out to sea. It was built before 1774 when it suffered much damage in a storm, following which Thomas Long, of Penheale and lord of the manors of Raphael and Lansallos, paid for its repair.

Parts of the harbour were rebuilt after destruction by a violent storm on 19 and 20 January 1817, when thirty large boats, two seiners and many smaller boats were destroyed with many parts of the village including the Green and Peak Rock were consumed by the sea waters and a number of houses were swept away. The damage was estimated at £2,000 but there were no deaths. This storm, with hurricane-force winds, caused damage to property from Plymouth to Land's End; the fishing boats at Polperro ″shared in the common calamity and exposed the unhappy sufferers to distress from which the industry of years can scarcely be expected to relieve them″.

In November 1824 the worst ever storm occurred: three houses were destroyed, the whole of one pier and half the other were swept away and nearly 50 boats in the harbour were dashed to pieces. Of the six boats that survived, only one of which was a Gaffer. Polperro's new pier was designed to afford better protection for the future. The East Indiaman Albemarle was blown ashore with a valuable cargo of diamonds, coffee, pepper, silk and indigo on 9 December 1708 near Polperro (the precise location of the wreck is yet to be discovered).

Jonathan Couch was the village doctor for many years, and wrote the history of the village as well as various works of natural history (particularly on ichthyology). The History of Polperro, 1871, was published after his death by his son, Thomas Quiller Couch, with many abridgements since. Couch contributed two series of articles to the periodical Notes and Queries – The Folklore of a Cornish Village 1855 and 1857, and these were incorporated in the History of Polperro, to which he also contributed a sketch of his father's life. The welfare of the fishermen and the prosperity of the fisheries were in his care together with his medical and scientific work.

Polperro's beauty has long been a magnet for artists. The celebrated Austrian painter Oskar Kokoschka, upon discovering Polperro, spent a year in the village between 1939 and 1940. It also features as a location for filming the TV drama series, Doc Martin and Beyond Paradise.

=== Smuggling ===
Duchy of Cornwall

Smuggling is understood to have prospered since Polperro developed as a port in the 12th century. It reached its zenith in the late 18th century when Britain's wars with America and France precipitated the high taxation of many imported goods, making it worthwhile for the local fishermen to boost their income by the covert importation of spirits, tobacco and other goods from Guernsey and elsewhere. By the late 18th century, much of the success of the smuggling trade through Polperro was controlled by Zephaniah Job (1749–1822), a local merchant who became known as the 'Smugglers' Banker'.

A more organised Coast Guard service was introduced in the 19th century together with the deterrent of stiff penalties, leading to much less smuggling. Part of the South West Coast Path was originally used by Revenue Officers as they patrolled the coast in search of smugglers. Whilst the South West Coast Path is maintained by the National Trust, the foreshore belongs to the Duchy of Cornwall.

=== Robert Jeffery ===
In 1807, on Commander Warwick Lake's HMS Recruit, Robert Jeffery, a Polperroite, was found to have stolen his midshipman's beer, and Lake, in a fit of pique, ordered him to be marooned on the island of Sombrero off Anguilla. Jeffery was born in Fowey but moved to Polperro before joining the merchant navy and then being press-ganged into the Royal Navy.

Some months later, Lake's commanding officer Sir Alexander Cochrane learned of what had happened and immediately ordered Lake to retrieve Jeffery. When Recruit arrived at Sombrero, Jeffery could not be found. Eventually the story got out and Lake was discharged from the Royal Navy by court martial for his actions. As it turned out, Jeffery had been rescued by an American ship and was discovered in Massachusetts three years later, working as a blacksmith; he was repatriated to Britain and awarded compensation.

== Economy ==
=== Tourism ===
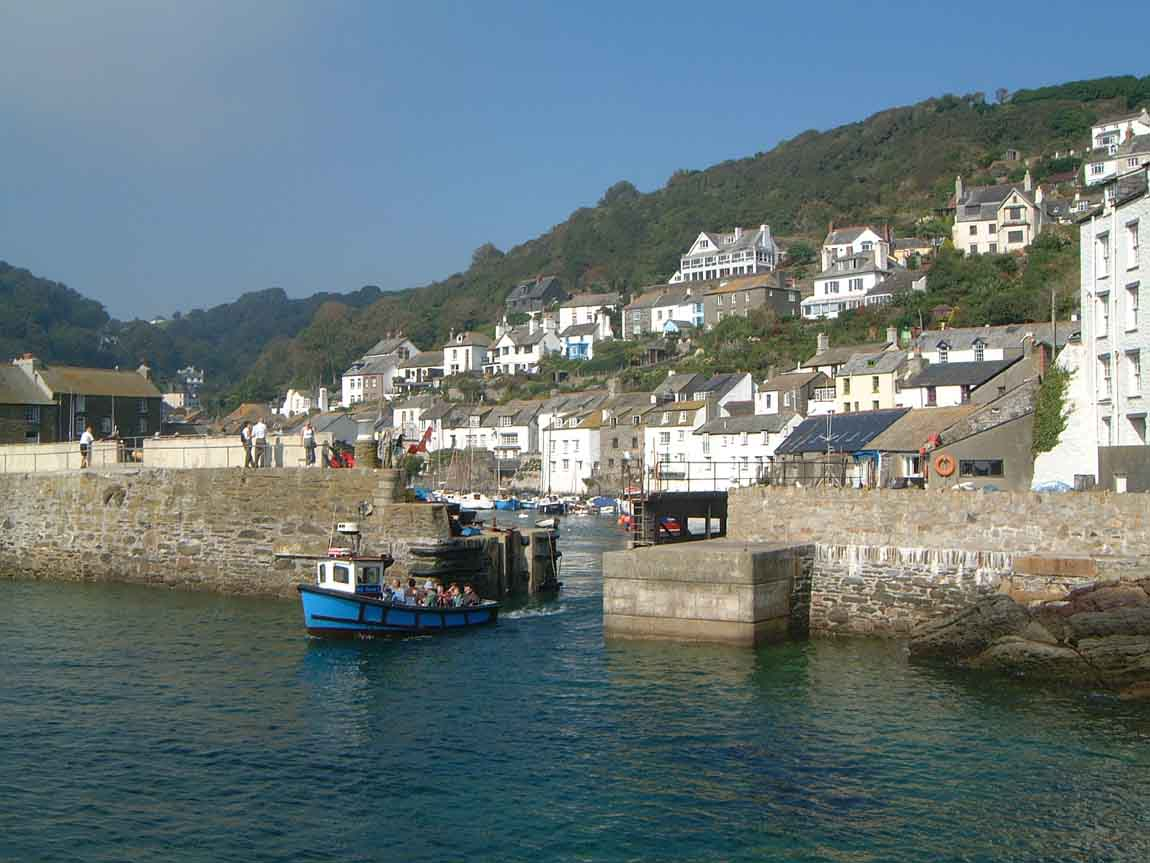
Tourists leaving Polperro's inner harbour on a fisherman's boat trip

Tourism became Polperro's main industry during the 20th century. The village is accessible by air via Plymouth or Newquay, by train via Looe railway station, by road and by boat. It was estimated that the village received about 25,000 visitors a day during summer in the 1970s. Visitors are no longer permitted to drive cars into the village, having to leave them in the main car park at Crumplehorn to the north of the village and walk through the half-mile length of the village to its harbour. The village's quaint but narrow streets make driving difficult. There are horse and cart rides and were previously milk floats disguised as trams for those who prefer not to walk. The milk floats have been replaced by tuk-tuks.

Attractions of Polperro include the South West Coast Path, the 630-mile (1,010 km)-long and established walk from Dorset to Somerset which passes through the village, and offers day walks along the local scenic coastline, in particular to nearby Talland Bay on the coast path heading East. Westwards, the path passes three large beaches en route to Fowey: Lansallos Beach, Lantivit Bay and Lantic Bay. Within the village is the Polperro Heritage Museum of Fishing and Smuggling, situated on the harbourside in an old fish processing warehouse, which houses interesting photographs of the village's history among other popular displays. Guided walks are available in the village, and boat trips can be taken from the harbour to view the coastline which can offer sightings of dolphins and seals.

The village has several restaurants as well as seven pubs. A holiday and caravan park is situated outside the village to the northeast at Carey Park.

=== Fishing ===
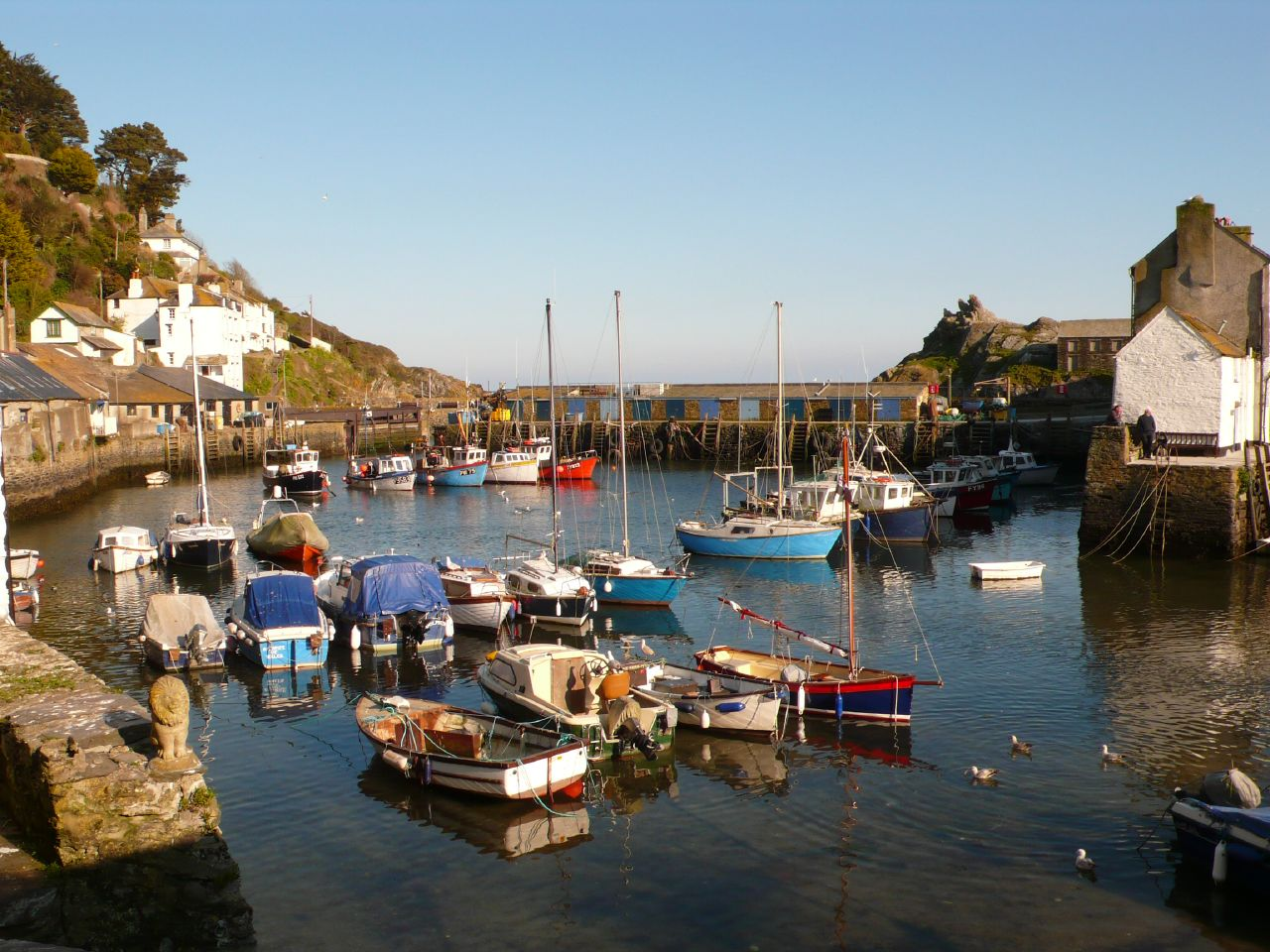
The harbour viewed from the village

Fishing was traditionally the principal occupation of Polperro families. For centuries the village has been a pilchard fishing and processing port. Fish are drawn for feeding off the South Cornwall coast in late summer bringing rich pickings for local fishermen. Once ashore, the fish were salted and pressed and the oil was collected as a by-product and used for heating and lighting. Polperro pilchards were exported throughout Europe.

Shoals of these fish diminished in the 20th century and pilchard fishing died out as Polperro's mainstay in the 1960s, however approximately twelve commercial fishing vessels still operate from the harbour catching flatfish, scallops, crabs, monkfish, ray, pollock, bass and cod. Fresh fish and seafood are available for purchase at the quayside from time to time.

=== Festivals ===
Other than traditional festival days, The Polperro Festival has been held annually since 1996, being a community festival run by volunteers beginning on the 3rd Saturday in June which helps to promote business for the village. It started as an Arts and crafts Festival, and has developed to include live music of many genres, dance, street entertainment, theatre and children's entertainment and local food. Most of the entertainment centres on Big Green, the village square, and for the last few years under a covered marquee. After 9 pm, for noise considerations, the festivities at Big Green disperse elsewhere.

==== Past Lord Mayors of Polperro ====
Here is a current list of all the previous Lord Mayors of Polperro since its conception in 1996:

- 1996 - Ashley Courts
- 1997 - John Holden
- 1998 - Brenda Thomas

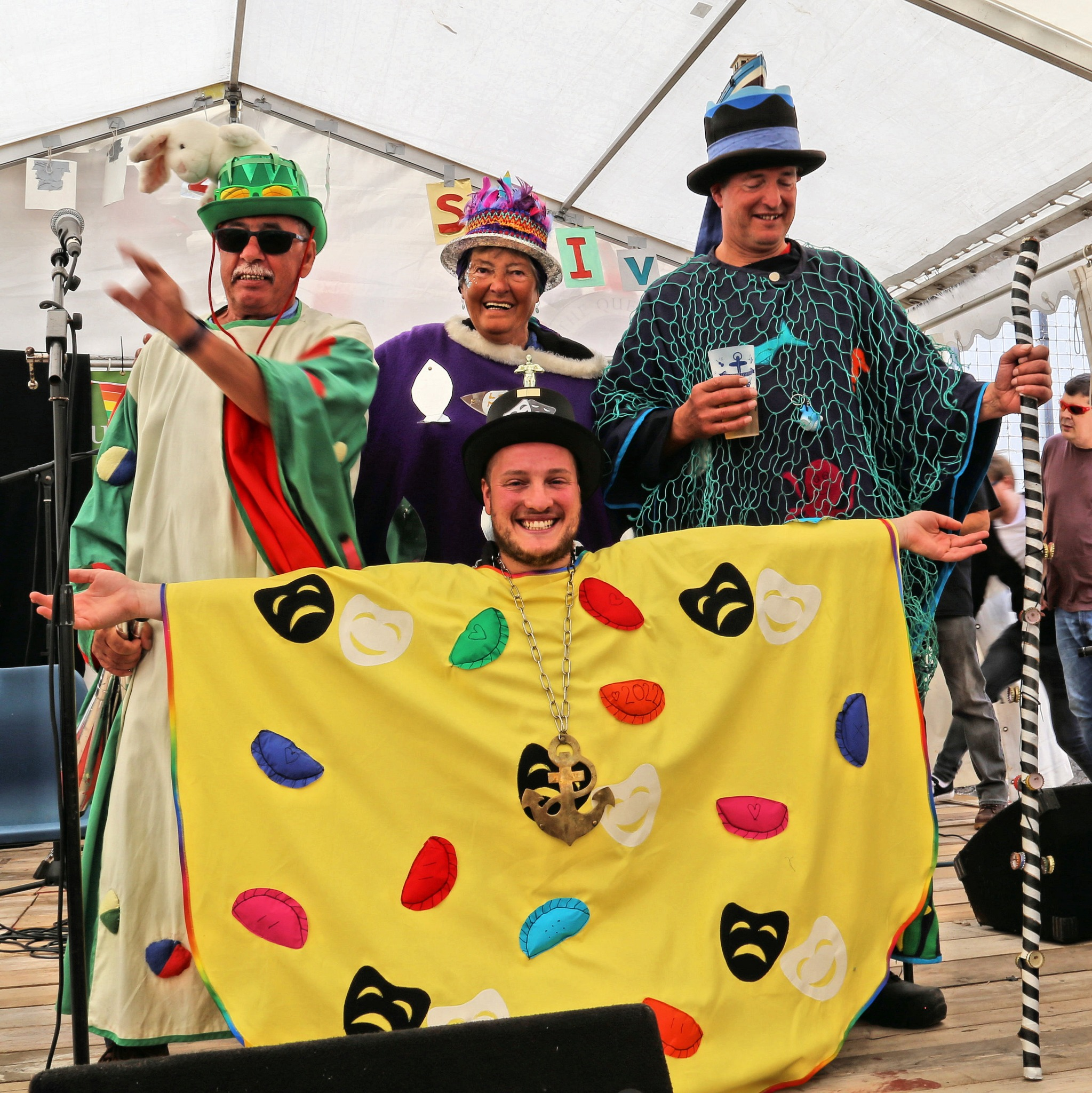
2022 Lord Mayor Phil Thomas with his family (ltr: 2014 Lord Mayor Franco Miceli, 1998 Lord Mayor Brenda Thomas & 2003 Lord Mayor Martin "Beaver" Thomas)

- 1999 - Joe Card
- 2000 - Chris Pannewitz
- 2001 - Terry Bicknell
- 2002 - Gilly Davis
- 2003 - Martin "Beaver" Thomas
- 2004 - Alun "Pendragon" Thomas
- 2005 - Ted Pilcher
- 2006 - Glenda Taper
- 2007 - Erica Gregory
- 2008 - John "Grandad" Marshall
- 2009 - Alan "Coach" Morris
- 2010 - Robert Chisman
- 2011 - Tony White
- 2012 - Sam Baker
- 2013 - Nathan "Small" Toms
- 2014 - Franco Miceli
- 2015 - Abbi Rendell
- 2016 - Brian & Rita Morgan
- 2017 - Gina Farrell
- 2018 - James Overton
- 2019 - Mike Jelly
- 2020 ‡
- 2021 ‡
- 2022 - Phil Thomas
- 2023 - Abbi & Andy Bryant
- 2024 - Bob Webb
- 2025 - Jade Toms

‡ Note: There was no festival held between 2020 & 2021 due to the COVID-19 pandemic. Instead Mike Jelly held onto the Lord Mayor title until handing over to Phil Thomas in 2022.

== Notable buildings ==
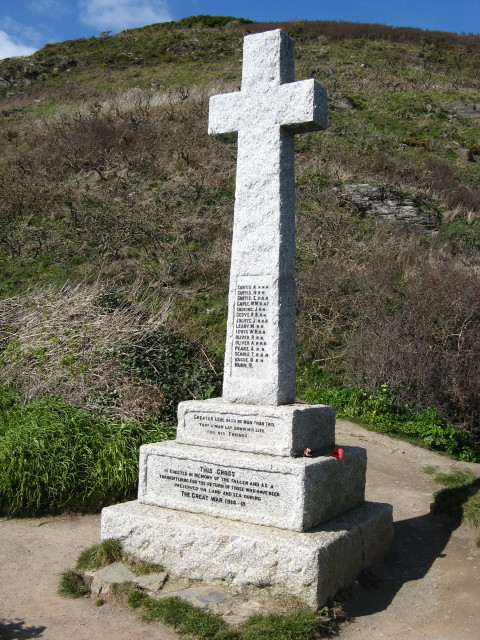
Polperro War Memorial on the Cornwall Coastal Path from Talland

Couch's House in Lansallos Street was home to naturalist and physician, Jonathan Couch and before him of many generations of the Quiller family who became prosperous through the proceeds of smuggling and buccaneering.

Polperro's War Memorial is some distance outside the village on the coast path towards Talland. Also, tucked away in the village's winding streets (on "The Warren"), is a house clad entirely in shells, known colloquially as "The Shell House". Located on the harbour's edge is the Net Loft, a Grade II Listed Building owned by the National Trust.

=== Churches ===
Situated in the Anglican diocese of Truro Polperro, although a small village, is served by two Church of England parishes divided by the River Pol: Lansallos to the west and Talland to the east. The 19th-century Anglican Chapel of St John, a chapel of ease to Talland Parish Church, stands in the village but no longer conducts services. John Wesley preached in the village in 1762 and 1768: by 1792 it was possible to build a large chapel accommodating 250 people and Methodism flourished in Polperro during the 1800s.

Sclerder Abbey, a Roman Catholic monastery, is located off the road to Looe, just outside the village.

== Science ==
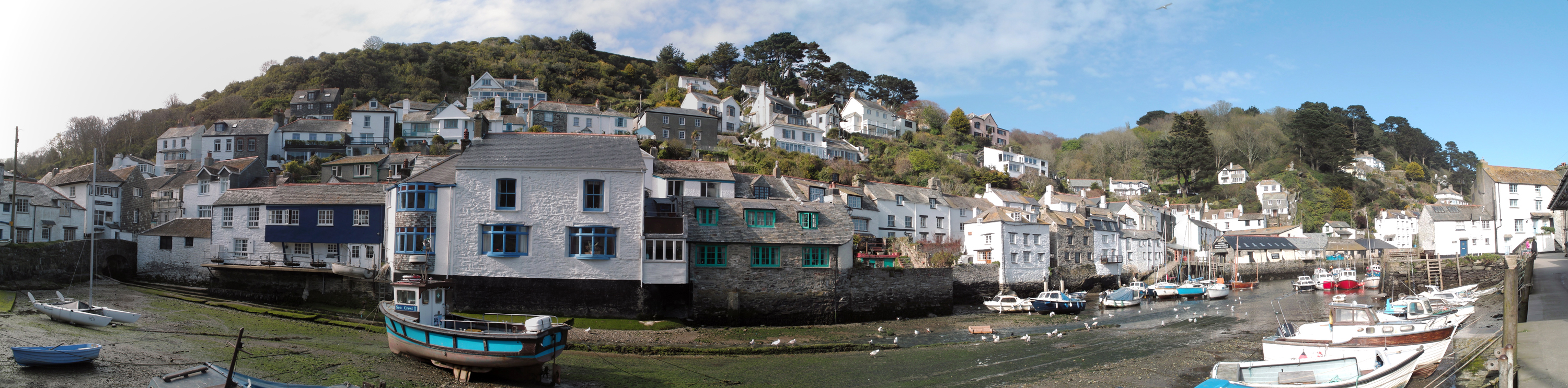
Low tide at Polperro harbour in May 2012.

In the late 19th century, Frank Perrycoste, Polperro resident from 1898, conducted a study of fingerprints at Polperro. He lived in the village and became interested of the prevalence of intermarriage amongst its inhabitants; Polperro being only accessible from the sea or by coastal path at that time. His sociological research included extensive genealogies of local families which are held at the College of Arms in London. His findings were shared with Sir Francis Galton who helped to advance criminology by the use of fingerprinting of criminals.

== Notable residents ==
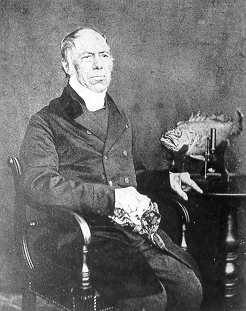
Jonathan Couch

- Jonathan Couch (1789–1870), naturalist, physician and antiquary.
- William Rendle (1811–1893), antiquary, interested in the borough of Southwark.
- Richard Quiller Couch (1816–1863), British naturalist, eldest son of Jonathan Couch.
- Angela Brazil (1868–1947), novelist
- Hugh Walpole (1884–1941), novelist
- Oskar Kokoschka (1886–1980), poet, playwright and artist of intense expressionistic portraits and landscapes
- Walter Greenwood (1903–1974), novelist, lived in Polperro briefly during the 1930s and founded the production company, Greenpark Productions, there in 1938.
- Anyon Cook (??, 20th C), illustrator for Enid Blyton. (Harbour Studio)
- Donald Adamson (1939–2024), literary scholar and historian, lived and died locally
- Rita Tushingham (born 1942), actress, lived in the village in the 1970s.
- Miles Leonard (born 1967), British music industry executive. Chairman Warner Music/Parlophone Records

== Council ==
Polperro Community Council is the lowest level of government for the parish.

== Bibliography ==
- Chambers, George Mervyn. Polperro: impressions in word and line, Polperro: Greywest, [ca. 1925]
- Couch, Jonathan (1871) History of Polperro, ed. Thomas Quiller Couch (many later editions, abridged)
- de Burlet, Sheila (1977) Portrait of Polperro: souvenir history of a beautiful village. Polperro Heritage Press [1997]
- Derriman, James (1994) Killigarth: three centuries of a Cornish manor [16c-18c]: Polperro Heritage Press
- Derriman, James (2006) Marooned: Polperro Heritage Press
- Rowett Johns, Jeremy (1997) The Smugglers' Banker: Polperro Heritage Press
- Rowett Johns, Jeremy (2010) Doctor By Nature: Jonathan Couch, Surgeon of Polperro: Polperro Heritage Press
- Winfield, Rif (2008). British Warships in the Age of Sail 1793-1817: design, construction, careers and fates. Seaforth. ISBN 978-1-86176-246-7.
