= Porthallow =

Village in Cornwall, England

Coordinates: 50.069°N 5.081°W

Porthallow: Cornish: Porthalow
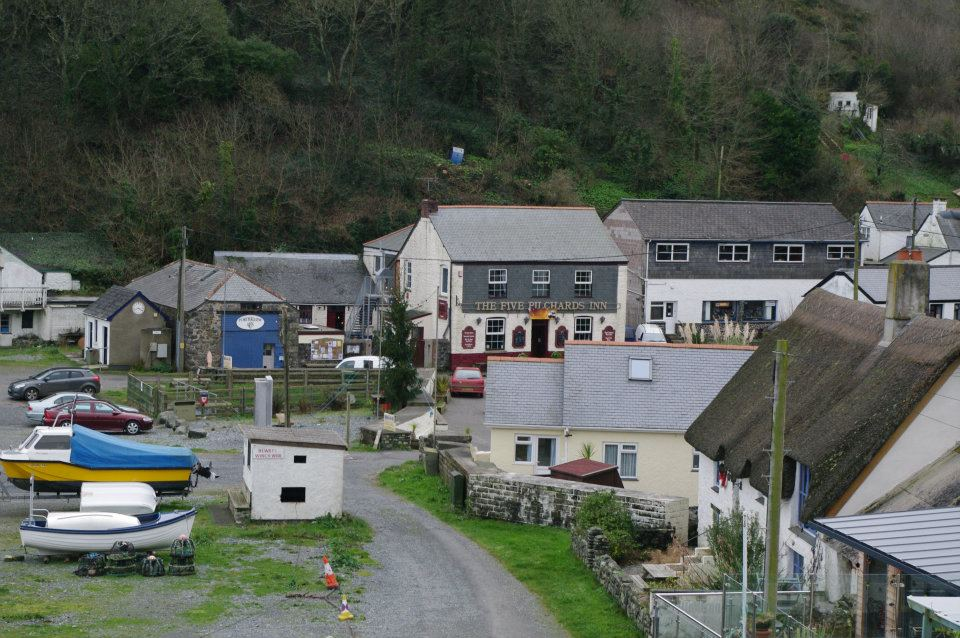
- Village of Porthallow

- Location within Cornwall
- OS grid reference: SW796233
  - London: 311 miles
- Civil parish: St Keverne
- Unitary authority: Cornwall
- Ceremonial county: Cornwall
- Region: South West
- Country: England
- Sovereign state: United Kingdom
- Post town: HELSTON
- Postcode district: TR12
- Dialling code: 01326
- Police: Devon and Cornwall
- Fire: Cornwall
- Ambulance: South Western
- UK Parliament: St Ives

Porthallow (Cornish: Porthalow, meaning cove of water lilies) is a small fishing village on the east coast of The Lizard peninsula to the south of the Helford River, in Cornwall, England. It lies in St Keverne parish, north of St Keverne village. One road runs through the village, and there is public house, the Five Pilchards, named for the pilchard fishery. Porthallow is at the midpoint of the South West Coast Path and is within the Cornwall Area of Outstanding Natural Beauty (AONB).

== Geology ==
The geology of the Lizard is complex and of great interest to geologists. The peninsula can be divided into two areas, with an irregular boundary running between Polurrian Cove on the west (Mount's Bay) coast and Porthallow in the east. To the north is the Meneage and to the south the Lizard District, with the geology differing greatly between the two districts. The coast to the north of the village is designated as a Geological Conservation Review (GCR) site, and to the north and south is designated as a Site of Special Scientific Interest (SSSI). Some 270 Ma years ago when the Lizard rocks were thrust up, the Meneage Crush Zone and Meneage Breccia was formed and the rocks to the north are of thick beds of conglomerates, and a combination of clay slates, mixed with sandstones and grits containing veins of quartz. To the south the rocks are serpentine, gabbro and hornblende schist.

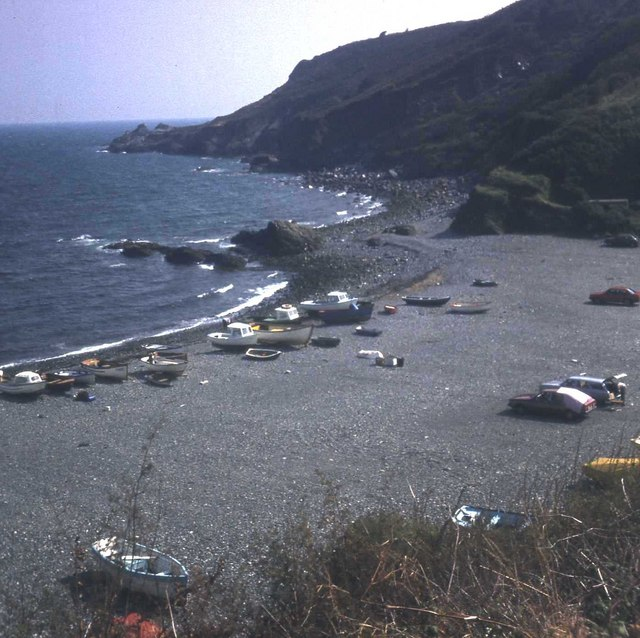
Porthallow beach

== History ==
Porthallow was a flourishing fishing village in the 13th century. It was first used as a fishing base by Beaulieu Abbey. Rents raised on fishing ports within the Duchy of Cornwall, during the 14th century, indicate that Porthallow was a major fishing village, paying slightly less rent than Fowey to the east.

In 1836, the West Briton newspaper reported that several ″seans″ operated on the Lizard Peninsula at Perhala (Porthallow), Proustock (Porthoustock), The Lizard (possibly Polpeor Cove), etc. Some were taken to Falmouth and sold for two shillings per hundred, and the rest would feed local people during the winter. The Trelowarren estate later owned the village and leased it to The Porthallow Pilchard Curing Company from 1914 to 1937. It was then bought by the Porthallow Institute and Reading Room.

An attempt was made to attract tourists to Porthallow in 1881 with an advertisement in The Cornishman newspaper on 9 June 1881 for a newly built inn. The advertisement mentioned the serpentine specimens and fine views on the cliffs, the good river and sea fishing and the perfectly safe sea bathing. In the 1960s, the village was popular as a launch site for diving on The Manacles with a compressor and dive shop on the beach. Diving activities and overnight camping were banned from the beach following years of late night parties, loud music and bonfires, when in 1971, Trustees from the village bought and ran the beach. The Porthallow Village Association became a charity in 2008 and is still maintained by a voluntary group of Trustees from the village. There is a diving centre at Porthkerris, 1 km to the south.

A new village hall was constructed in 2010.
