= Talland =

Hamlet in Cornwall, England

Coordinates: 50°20′N 4°29′W

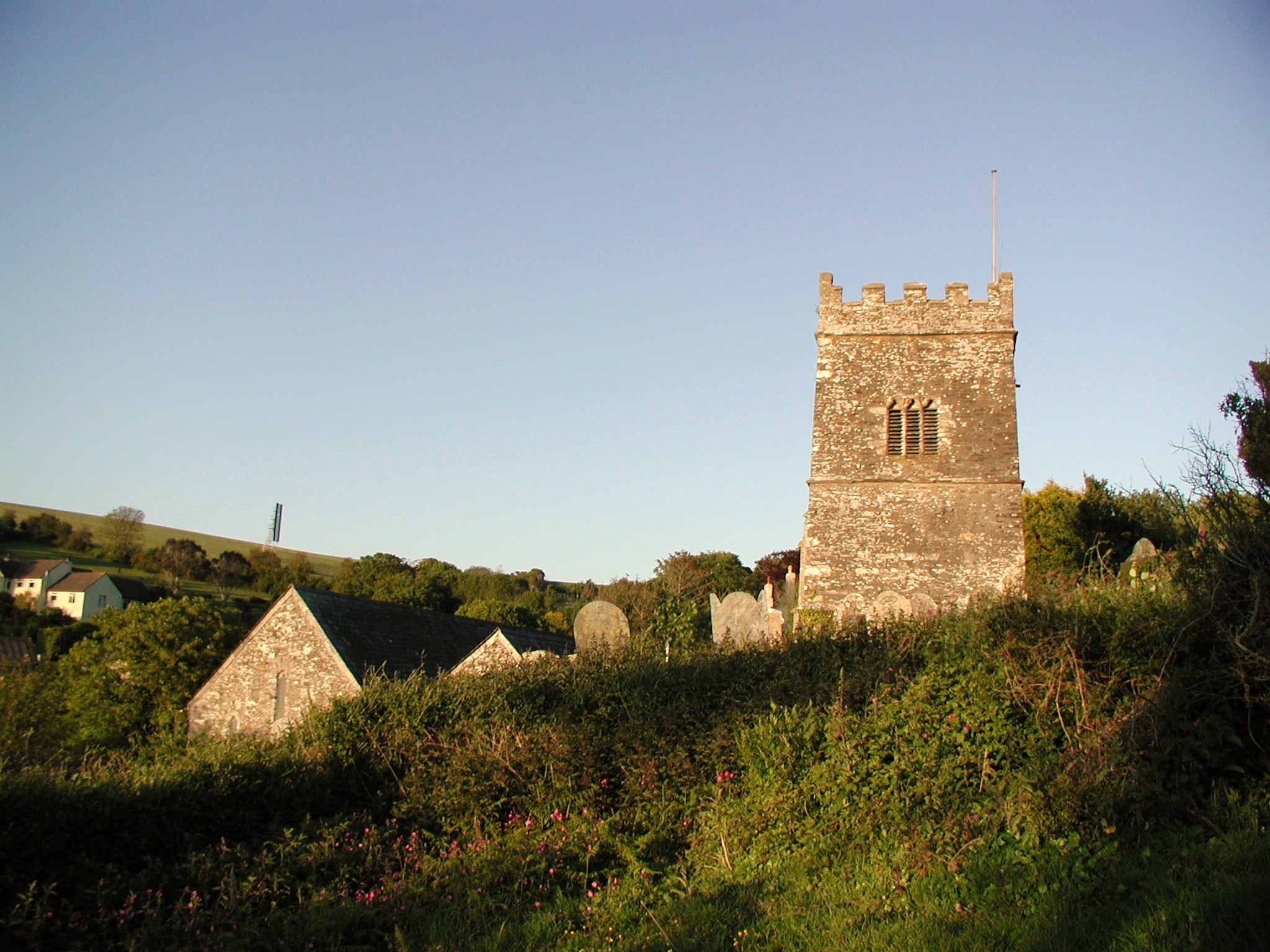
- Talland Church

- Location within Cornwall
- Civil parish: Polperro
- Unitary authority: Cornwall
- Shire county: Cornwall
- Region: South West
- Country: England
- Sovereign state: United Kingdom

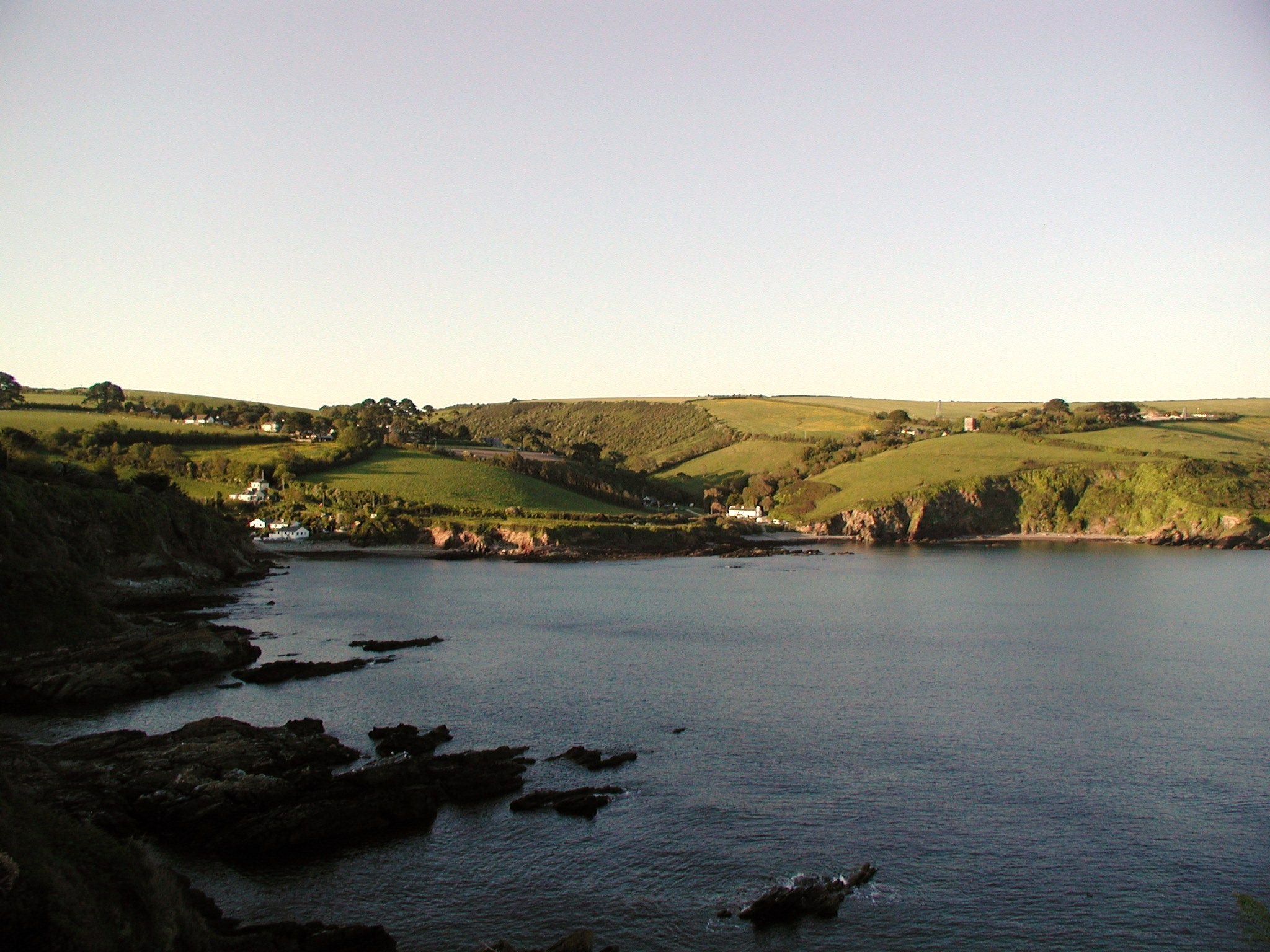
View of the bay from the west

Talland (Cornish: Tallan, lit. 'hill brow church site') is a hamlet and ecclesiastical parish and former civil parish, between Looe and Polperro, now in the parish of Polperro, in the Cornwall district, on the south coast of Cornwall, England (the parish includes the eastern part of the village of Polperro, where there is a chapel of ease and formerly also the town of West Looe). It consists of a church, the Old Vicarage and a few houses. In 1931 the parish had a population of 768. On 1 April 1934 the civil parish was abolished and merged with Lansallos, part also went to form Looe.

On Talland Bay are two sheltered shingle beaches, Talland Sand and Rotterdam Beach, and the bay was once well known as a landing spot for smugglers. There are several small beaches in Talland Bay, served by a small car park and café. There is also Talland Bay Hotel. Two towers mark one end of a nautical measured mile, the other end is marked by two towers near Hannafore, West Looe.

== Talland Parish Church ==
The church at Talland, dramatically located on the cliff-top, is dedicated to St Tallan and as such is unique in Britain. Unusually it has a detached bell-tower on the south side which was joined to the main body of the church in the 15th century. There survives old woodwork in its fine wagon roofs; and the many benchends (partly ca. 1520, the rest ca. 1600) are of the usual Cornish type and among the finest examples of these.

== Landscape and development ==
The environment, one of the most unspoiled in south-west England, is a designated Area of Outstanding Natural Beauty and a Heritage Coast. In October 2007 Caradon District Council granted planning permission for the building of 40 houses costing between £285,000 and £350,000. This controversial development is supposedly in keeping with the local area.

Talland Barton Farmland has been designated a Site of Special Scientific Interest for its assemblage of nationally rare and nationally scarce mosses; in particular for the many-fruited beardless moss (Weissia multicapsularis), which is known from only two sites worldwide.

== History and antiquities ==
An important source for the history is Jonathan Couch's History of Polperro, (1871), issued after his death by his son, Thomas Quiller Couch and abridgements of it have been issued many times since: see History of Polperro

Talland Bay has been the scene of many shipwrecks including that of a French trawler, the Marguerite, in March 1922. Two private boats performed a dramatic rescue and all 21 people were saved. The remains of the ship's boiler can still be clearly seen on the beach at low tide.

A stone cross was found in the 1920s at East Waylands Farm as part of farm buildings. On 12 May 1930 it was erected at Portlooe Cross, a road junction northeast of Portlooe Farm.

== Well-known occasional residents ==
The television presenters Richard Madeley and Judy Finnigan own a holiday home in Talland.

The Talland School of Equitation in Cirencester, Gloucestershire, was named after Talland Bay.
