= Crumplehorn =

Kingdom in Cornwall, England

Coordinates: 50.3360°N 4.5239°W

Crumplehorn: Cornish: Trevelhorn
- Hamlet
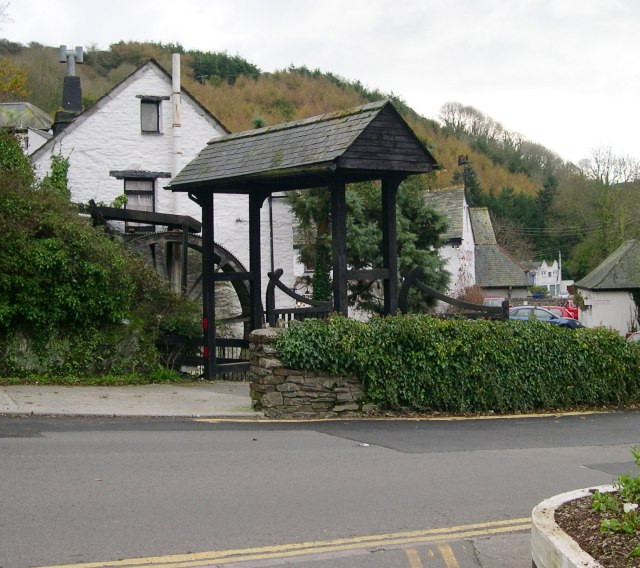
- The old watermill at Crumplehorn, 2005

- Location within Cornwall
- Unitary authority: Cornwall
- Region: South West
- Country: England
- Sovereign state: United Kingdom
- Police: Devon and Cornwall
- Fire: Cornwall
- Ambulance: South Western

Crumplehorn (Cornish: Trevelhorn, meaning Melhorn's farm) is a hamlet in Cornwall, England. It forms the northern part of the village of Polperro, within the civil parish of Polperro and is located 4 miles (6.4 km) west of the town of Looe.

It serves as the main carpark for Polperro, as visitor vehicles are not permitted in the village itself.

It also has a 14th-century mill, which is now an inn. The Grade II listed building is constructed of stone rubble, with a slate roof. Although the machinery has been removed, the hybrid overshot water wheel has been retained. It was manufactured by G. H. Harris of Wadebridge, and replaced an earlier timber wheel. It was the home of Zephaniah Job before it ceased to be used in 1923. Job was a great benefactor of Polperro, where he acted as a banker, accountant and advisor. Now a pub with accommodation, it welcomes thousands of visitors every year.
