= Bernard Moore (poet) =

- Born: Samuel Syrus Hunt; 1873; Greenwich
- Died: 1953 (aged 79–80); Hemel Hempstead
- Occupation: Teacher
- Spouse: Edith Emily Parsons (1901 - his death)
- Writing career
- Genres: Cornish Poem, War Poem

Samuel Syrus Hunt (1873–1953) wrote poetry under the pseudonym Bernard Moore. He had six books published of both his own and collected works beginning in 1914. His subject was mainly Cornwall, in particular its fishermen but he also wrote war poetry. Many of his poems are written in the Cornish dialect. He also collected some Cornish songs. He is best known for his poem 'Travelling' which contrasts the sights and sounds of a railway journey through grimy urban London with the tranquility of one on the rural Looe Valley Line.

== Personal life ==
Hunt lived in Catford, London and later near Tring, Hertfordshire. While working as a teacher in London in 1918 he enlisted in the British Army and served as a Sergeant in the London and Middlesex Regiments from 1918-19.

He was made a bard of the Cornish Gorseth in 1934 taking the bardic name 'Morrep'

== Travelling (poem) ==
In his poem written c. 1919, Hunt lists stations along the railway line towards the City as called out by the Porter:

‘Peckham Rye, Loughborough, Elephant, St. Paul’s,’

and contrasts them with idyllic sounding destinations on the Liskeard and Looe Railway:

‘Moorswater, Causeland, Sandplace, Looe’…

The Bookman wrote of it in 1919 "There is sincerity in every line [...] a note of deep feeling in the seemingly lightly expressed poem 'Travelling'".

In 1925 the Rev. T. W. Slater in the journal The United Methodist wrote "I wonder how many Cornishmen there are in and around London! I have no idea, but I am certain in all that vast number there's not one but shares Mr. Moore's feeling in 'Travelling'.

The poem inspired the creation of a computer simulation of the Looe branch line in 2007.

In 2012 the railway author Michael Williams called it "one of the most evocative, I reckon, ever written about a country branch line".

When written Peckham Rye, Loughborough Junction, Elephant & Castle and St. Paul’s were stations on the London, Chatham and Dover Railway, now Kent Thameslink. St. Paul's has since been renamed Blackfriars and Kent Thameslink trains no longer call at Loughborough Junction. Moorswater closed to passengers in 1901 when a connection to Liskeard was opened.

== Bibliography ==
- Cornish Catches (1914), London: Erskine Macdonald
- A Cornish Haul (1916), London: Arthur H. Stockwell
- A Cornish Chorus (1919), London: Sidgwick and Jackson
- Cornish Corners (1923), London: C. W. Daniel
- A Cornish Collection (1933), London: C. W. Daniel
- A Cornish Gleaning (1948), London: Peter Ratazzi
- Cornish Crowsheaf (1949), self-published

== See also ==
- Cornish Literature
