= Causeland railway station =

Railway station in Cornwall, England

Causeland Tir an Bughes

General information
- Location: Causeland, Cornwall; England
- Coordinates: 50.40580°N 4.46640°W
- Grid reference: SX248591
- Manager: Great Western Railway
- Platforms: 1

Other information
- Station code: CAU
- Classification: DfT category F2

Key dates
- 1879: Opened

Passengers
- 2021/22: ▲2,040
- 2022/23: ▼1,588
- 2023/24: ▲1,800
- 2024/25: ▲2,108
- 2025/26: ▼1,556
Location
Notes
- Passenger statistics from the Office of Rail and Road

Causeland railway station (Cornish: Tir an Bughes) serves the hamlet of Causeland. Located 5 miles (8.0 km) south of Liskeard and 3 miles 58 chains (6.0 km) north of Looe, it is an intermediate station on the scenic Looe Valley Line in Cornwall, United Kingdom. The station is managed by Great Western Railway, who provide all services.

== History ==
The Liskeard and Looe Railway through the site was opened on 27 December 1860 to carry goods traffic, and passenger trains started from the station on 11 September 1879. The railway in those days connected with the Liskeard and Caradon Railway at Moorswater, and Causeland was the only other station apart from Looe.

In December 1881 Causeland was closed and a new station, intended as a replacement, opened a little further down the valley at Sandplace. Causeland was reopened in June 1888 as a result of public pressure. The suffix 'halt' was used sporadically throughout the 20th century.

Services after dusk were suspended due to lack of platform lighting around 1992. New lighting was installed in the early 21st century.

== Facilities ==
Very few facilities are provided at Causeland, consisting of a simple waiting shelter, a payphone and an information board with timetable posters. There are no ticket buying facilities, so passengers have to buy a ticket in advance or from the guard on the train.

== Passenger volume ==
Passengers by year
Year (Note: The passenger data covers twelve month periods that start in April.)	Entries and exits
2004–2005	2,281
2005–2006	2,671
2006–2007	3,035
2007–2008	3,471
2008–2009	4,014
2009–2010	3,652
2010–2011	2,674
2011–2012	3,366
2012–2013	2,544
2013–2014	2,198
2014–2015	2,094
2015–2016	1,976
2016–2017	1,736
2017–2018	1,834
2018–2019	1,620
2019–2020	1,336
2020–2021	504
2021–2022	2,040
2022–2023	1,588
2023–2024	1,800
2024–2025	2,108

The statistics cover twelve month periods that start in April.

== Services ==
Class 150 arrives with a service to Looe

Trains typically operate hourly in each direction between Liskeard and Looe, though there are certain gaps throughout day which sees some trains run non-stop between the two stations. Causeland is a request stop - this means that passengers alighting here must tell the guard that they wish to do so, and those waiting to join must signal clearly to the driver as the train approaches. There is no Sunday service in the winter.

Preceding station	National Rail	Following station
St Keyne Wishing Well Halt towards Liskeard	Great Western Railway Looe Valley Line	Sandplace towards Looe

== Community rail ==
The railway between Liskeard and Looe is designated as a community rail line and is supported by marketing provided by the Devon and Cornwall Rail Partnership. The line is promoted under the "Looe Valley Line" name.

== Cultural references ==
Causeland is one of the stations named in Bernard Moore's poem Travelling.

== Bibliography ==
- Caton, Peter (2018). Remote Stations. Leicestershire: Matador. ISBN 978-1-78901-408-2.
- Quick, Michael (2023). Railway Passenger Stations in Great Britain: A Chronology (PDF) (5th ed.). London: Railway and Canal Historical Society.
