= Coombe, Liskeard =

Hamlet in Cornwall, England

Coordinates: 50.44485°N 4.48158°W

Coombe: Cornish: Komm
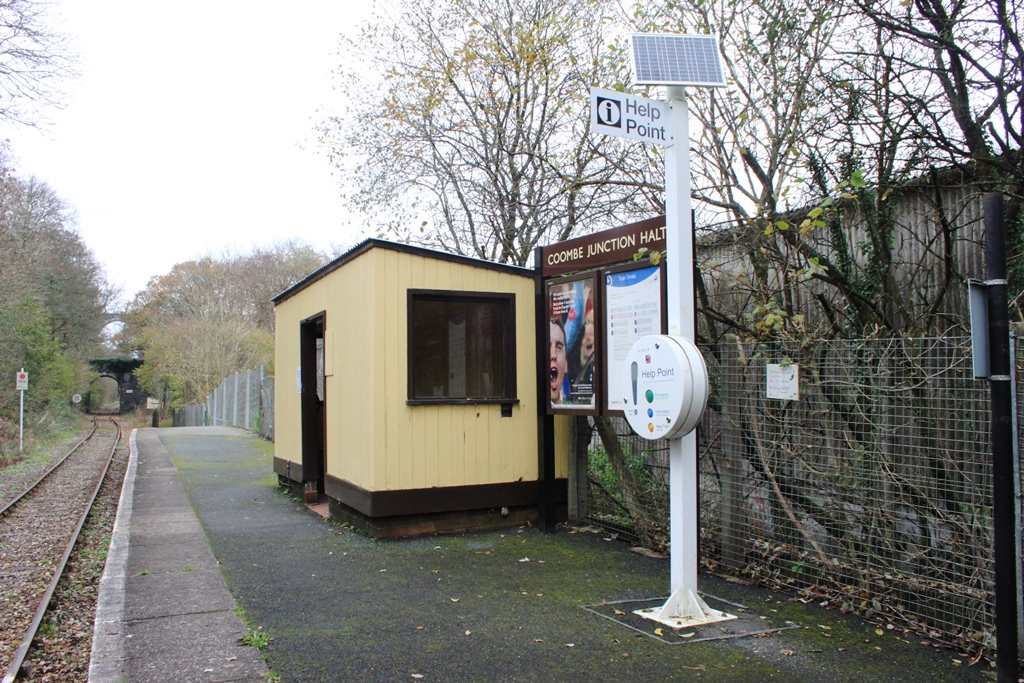

- Location within Cornwall
- Unitary authority: Cornwall
- Region: South West
- Country: England
- Sovereign state: United Kingdom
- Police: Devon and Cornwall
- Fire: Cornwall
- Ambulance: South Western

Coombe (Cornish: Komm) is a settlement in Cornwall, England, United Kingdom. It is situated one mile (1.6 km) southwest of Liskeard.

Coombe Junction Halt is a station and railway junction on the Looe Valley Line railway which runs from Liskeard station to Looe station.
