= St Keyne Wishing Well Halt railway station =

Railway station in Cornwall, England

St Keyne Wishing Well Halt
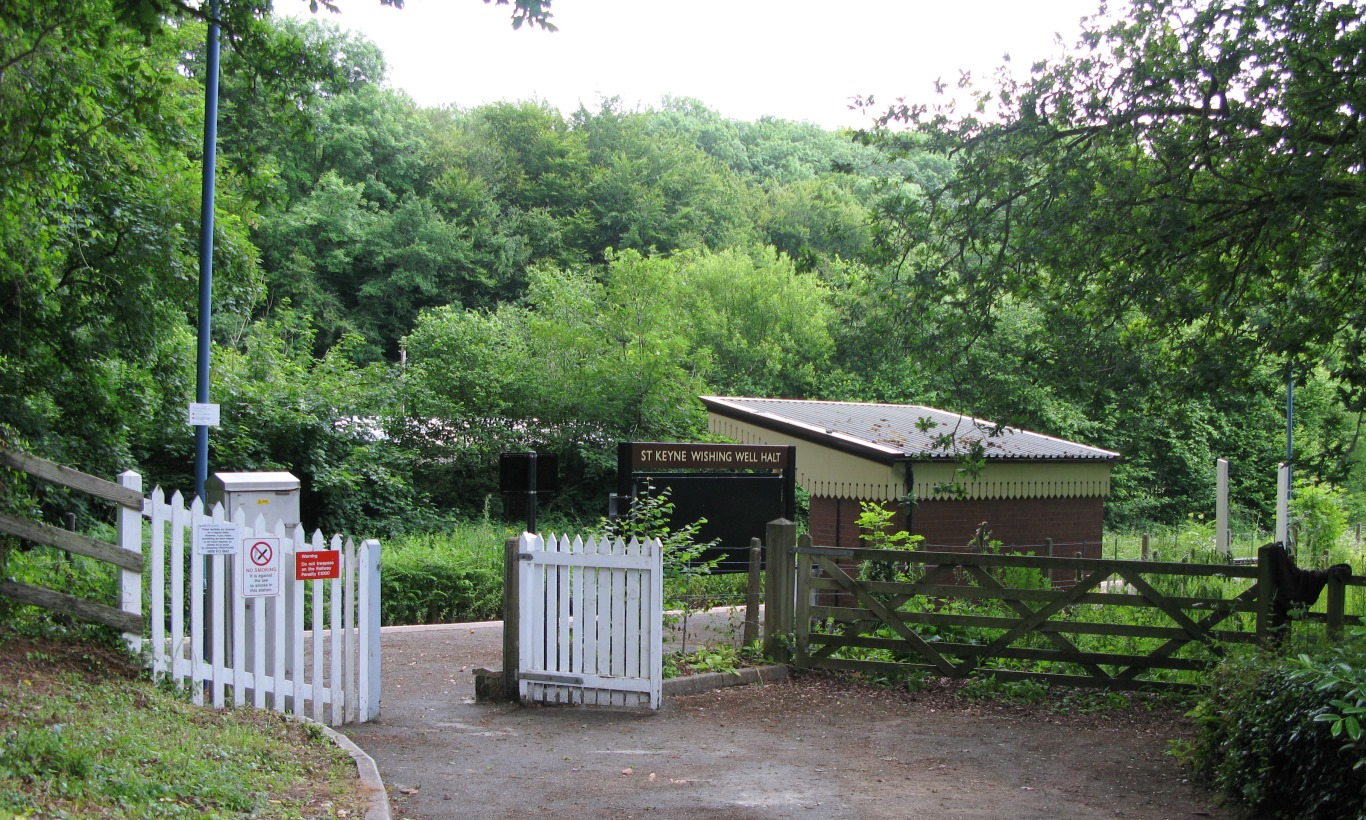

General information
- Location: St Keyne, Cornwall; England
- Coordinates: 50.422°N 4.463°W
- Grid reference: SX251610
- Manager: Great Western Railway
- Platforms: 1

Other information
- Station code: SKN
- Classification: DfT category F2

Key dates
- 1902: opened

Passengers
- 2021/22: ▲1,500
- 2022/23: ▲1,524
- 2023/24: ▼1,506
- 2024/25: ▲1,586
- 2025/26: ▼1,506
Location
Notes
- Passenger statistics from the Office of Rail and Road

St Keyne Wishing Well Halt railway station is an intermediate station on the scenic Looe Valley Line in Cornwall, England. It serves the village of St Keyne, and is adjacent to the Magnificent Music Machines museum of fairground organs and similar instruments.

St Keyne's Well is a holy well dedicated to Saint Keyne, located about 0.8 kilometres (0.5 mi) south of the station.

== History ==
The Liskeard and Looe Railway was opened on 27 December 1860 to carry goods traffic; passenger trains started on 11 September 1879. The railway in those days connected only with the Liskeard and Caradon Railway at Moorswater. The link from Coombe Junction to Liskeard railway station opened on 25 February 1901 and St Keyne station opened in October 1902.

== Naming ==
It is one of only two stations on the network to have the suffix "halt": the other is Coombe Junction on the same line. The term "halt" was removed from British Rail timetables and station signs and other official documents by 1974: the return of the term came in 1978 for the opening of IBM Halt in Scotland and in the renaming of these two stations in 2008.

The station name is rendered on tickets as merely 'St Keyne'.

== Facilities ==
The only facilities are a small waiting shelter and information boards, including timetable posters. There are no ticket buying facilities, so passengers have to buy a ticket in advance or from the guard on the train.

== Services ==
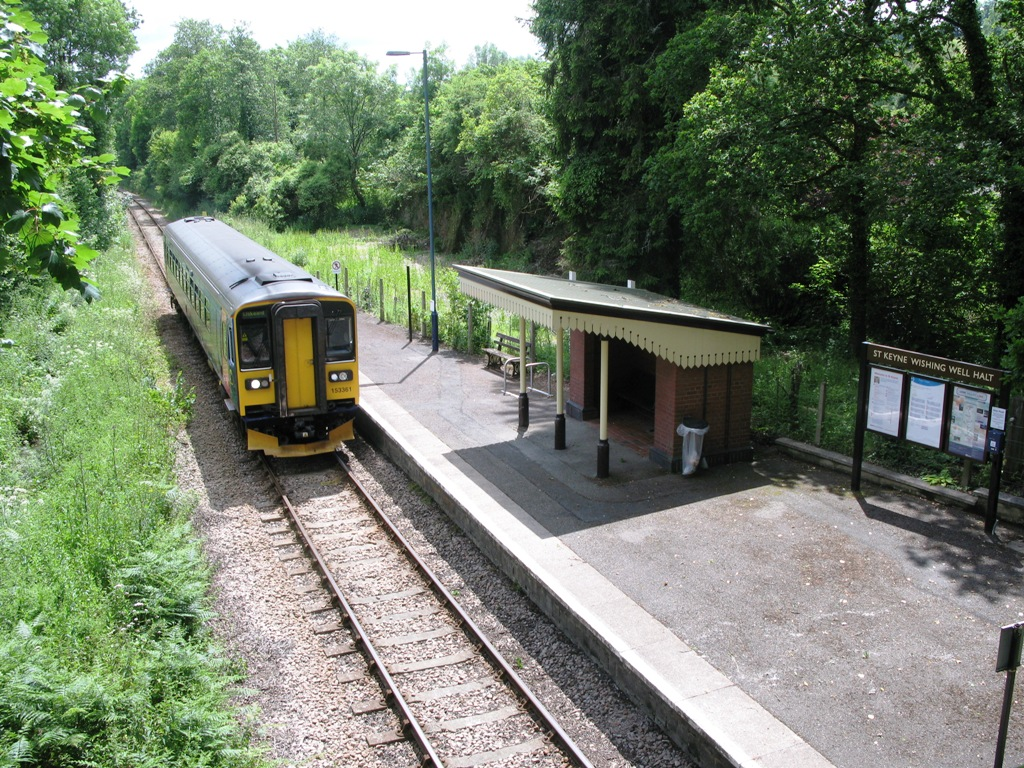
153361 passes through on its way to Liskeard

The December 2025 and May 2026 timetables show ten trains on the Looe Valley Line between Liskeard and Looe serving St Keyne Wishing Well Halt in each direction on weekdays and eight on Sundays. Two trains on weekdays call at all stations, the remainder call at all stations except Coombe Junction Halt. These trains only call on request. This means that passengers alighting here must tell the conductor that they wish to do so, and those waiting to join must signal clearly to the driver as the train approaches.

Preceding station	National Rail	Following station
Coombe Junction Halt towards Liskeard	Great Western Railway Looe Valley Line	Causeland towards Looe

== Community rail ==
The railway between Liskeard and Looe is designated as community rail and is supported by marketing provided by the Devon and Cornwall Rail Partnership.

The line is promoted as the "Looe Valley Line".
