= Sandplace railway station =

Railway station in Cornwall, England

Sandplace Tewesva

General information
- Location: Sandplace, Cornwall; England
- Coordinates: 50.3872°N 4.46481°W
- Grid reference: SX248570
- Manager: Great Western Railway
- Platforms: 1

Other information
- Station code: SDP
- Classification: DfT category F2

Key dates
- 1881: opened

Passengers
- 2021/22: ▲1,316
- 2022/23: ▼1,154
- 2023/24: ▼1,006
- 2024/25: ▼966
- 2025/26: ▲1,038
Location
Notes
- Passenger statistics from the Office of Rail and Road

Sandplace railway station (Cornish: Tewesva) serves the hamlet of Sandplace. Located 6.5 miles (10 km) south of Liskeard, it is an intermediate station on the scenic Looe Valley Line in Cornwall, England, United Kingdom. The station is managed by Great Western Railway, who provide all services.

== History ==
The Liskeard and Looe Railway was opened on 27 December 1860 to carry goods traffic; passenger trains started on 11 September 1879, but Sandplace did not have a station until December 1881. A goods siding was provided a little distance south of the station but has been closed for many years.

== Facilities ==
The only facilities provided at the station are a small waiting shelter, a bench and an information board, with timetable posters. There are no ticket buying facilities, so passengers have to buy a ticket in advance or from the guard on the train.

== Services ==
Class 150 departs with a service to Liskeard

Trains typically operate hourly in each direction between Liskeard and Looe, though there are certain gaps throughout day which sees some trains run non-stop between the two stations. Sandplace is a request stop - this means that passengers alighting here must tell the guard that they wish to do so, and those waiting to join must signal clearly to the driver as the train approaches. There is no Sunday service in the winter.

Preceding station	National Rail	Following station
Causeland towards Liskeard	Great Western Railway Looe Valley Line	Looe Terminus

== Community rail ==
The railway between Liskeard and Looe is designated as a community rail line and is supported by marketing provided by the Devon and Cornwall Rail Partnership. The line is promoted under the "Looe Valley Line" name.

The "Polraen Country House Hotel" is included in the Looe Valley Line rail ale trail. This is one of the most difficult rail ale trail pubs to visit as it has very limited opening hours.

== Cultural references ==
Sandplace is one of the stations named in Bernard Moore's poem Travelling.
