= Coombe Junction Halt railway station =

Railway station in Cornwall, England

Coombe Junction Halt
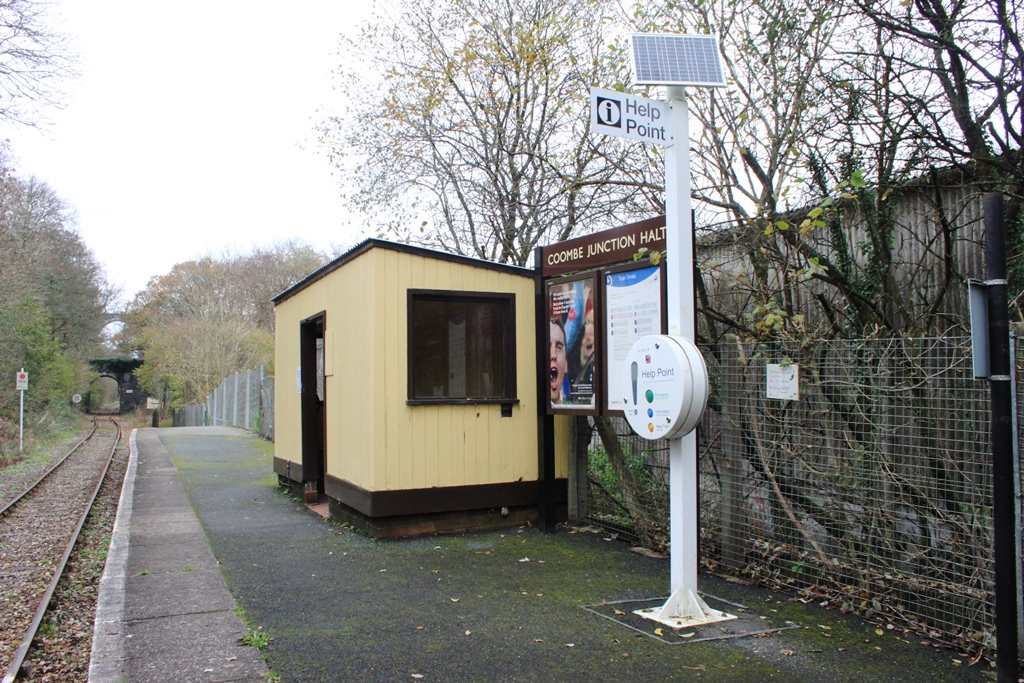
- Looking towards Moorswater

General information
- Location: Coombe, Cornwall; England
- Coordinates: 50.4449°N 4.48109°W
- Grid reference: SX239635
- Manager: Great Western Railway
- Platforms: 1

Other information
- Station code: COE
- Classification: DfT category F2

Key dates
- 1901: Opened

Passengers
- 2021–2022: ▲112
- 2022–2023: ▲120
- 2023–2024: ▲140
- 2024–2025: ▲224
- 2025–2026: ▲246
Location

Coombe Junction Halt railway station serves the villages of Coombe and Lamellion near Liskeard, Cornwall, England. It is situated on the Looe Valley Line between Liskeard and St Keyne Wishing Well Halt, 6 miles 44 chains (10.5 km) from the terminus at Looe. All trains on this line have to reverse at Coombe Junction, but very few continue the short distance into the platform to allow passengers to alight or join the train.

It is the least used station in Cornwall, and one of the least used in the whole of the United Kingdom. It opened in 1901 and is now managed by Great Western Railway, who operate all services.

== History ==
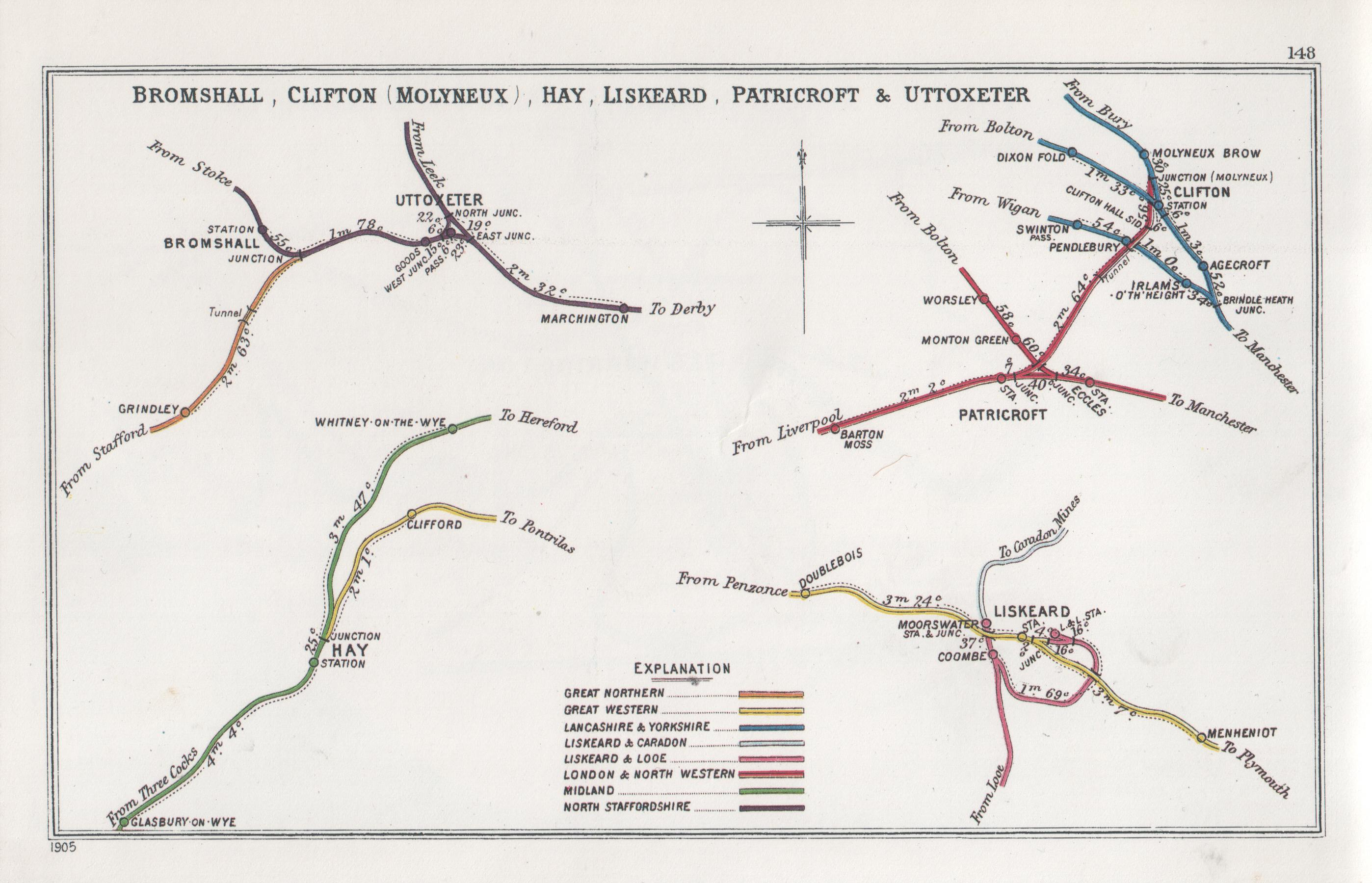
A 1905 Railway Clearing House Junction Diagram showing (lower right) railways in the vicinity of Coombe Junction

The Liskeard and Looe Railway was opened on 27 December 1860 to carry goods traffic. It had an end-on junction with the Liskeard and Caradon Railway at Moorswater which served quarries in the hills above Liskeard. Passenger trains started to run from Moorswater to Looe on 11 September 1879.

There was no station at Coombe at first, but from 1896 trains would call to set down passengers going to Liskeard if they notified the guard. This allowed them to go up the steep road from Coombe to the station which was a considerably shorter route than the road from Moorswater through Liskeard. It is not recorded if a platform was provided for them at Coombe.

The connecting line up to Liskeard opened for goods traffic on 25 February 1901. Passenger trains started to use this line on 8 May 1901 but continued to call at Moorswater for another week until the station at Coombe Junction was opened on 15 May 1901. All trains called at what is now Coombe Junction station while the locomotive ran around to the south end of the train to continue the journey.

Closure of the station was planned in 1966 but was reprieved by then-Minister for Transport Barbara Castle.

== Naming ==
It is one of the only two stations in the National Rail Timetable to have the suffix 'halt' (the other being nearby St Keyne Wishing Well Halt). Although opened as Coombe Junction halt, the term 'halt' was removed from British Rail timetables and station signs and other official documents by 1968 (in addition to "junction"), so that the station became known mononymously as Coombe; the return of the terms came only for these two stations on 18 May 2008.

The station was shown on tickets in 2011 as 'Coombe Cornwall'.

== Description ==
The station is 6 miles 44 chains (10.5 km) from Looe. (Note: The official mileage at Coombe Junction is 6 miles 63 chains but this is measured from the original site of the station at Looe before it was moved 19 chains closer to Coombe.) It has a single platform on the east side of the track. It has relatively few passenger facilities: only a concrete shelter and a help point. The track continues north of the station for freight trains to Moorswater. Regular freight traffic ceased in 2020 but the track remains in place for any goods traffic that needs it.

All trains between Liskeard and Looe have to reverse at Coombe Junction, but very few continue the short distance into the platform to allow passengers to alight or join the train.

== Signalling ==
Coombe Number 2 Ground Frame hut and lever

Coombe Junction signal box was situated on the west side of the line between the platform and the level crossing near the junction. It had 26 levers including 6 spares when it opened in 1901. The lever frame was replaced in 1956 but still had 26 levers. The signal box was closed in 1981.

The points are now worked by the guard of the train using two ground frames on the east side of the line. Number 1 Ground Frame is at the junction south of the station, 10 chains (200 m) from the platform mid point and 1 ch (20 m) from the junction itself. This is used every time a train arrives from or departs for Looe. Number 2 Ground Frame is 34 ch (680 m) from Number 1, just beyond the platform, and controls entry and exit on the line to Moorswater.

== Passengers ==
The station is the least used in Cornwall As a result of the low patronage, events have taken place to artificially increase the station's usage figures, such as on 14 May 2016 when 108 people boarded at the station for Liskeard. and often appears in the list of least used train stations of Great Britain.

The number of journeys starting or ending at Coombe Junction recorded each year up to 2016 generally totalled fewer than 100, but since then have sometimes exceeded 200. During the COVID-19 pandemic in the United Kingdom they dropped to just 28 but returned to pre-COVID levels by 2024–2025.

Passengers by year
Year (Note: The passenger data covers twelve month periods that start in April.)	Entries and exits
1997–1998	127
1998–1999	56
1999–2000	32
2000–2001	44
2001–2002	45
2002–2003	71
2003–2004	No data
2004–2005	96
2005–2006	59
2006–2007	32
2007–2008	54
2008–2009	118
2009–2010	42
2010–2011	38
2011–2012	60
2012–2013	48
2013–2014	42
2014–2015	26
2015–2016	48
2016–2017	212
2017–2018	156
2018–2019	204
2019–2020	188
2020–2021	28
2021–2022	112
2022–2023	120
2023–2024	140
2024–2025	224
2025–2026	246

== Services ==
Coombe is served by just two trains a day in each direction Monday to Saturday, one in the morning and one mid-afternoon, but there is no Sunday service. Trains are scheduled to take 9 minutes to reach Liskeard and 25 minutes to Looe.

There were more trains in the past as locomotives had to run round their trains to continue the journey to Looe or Liskeard. For example, in 1909 there were four trains each way Monday to Friday, three on Saturday and two on Sunday. The journey time to Liskeard was 8 minutes and to Looe took 24 minutes. In later years the first train on Saturdays was advertised as 'non stop' for passengers but it still had to stop in the platform to run round the carriages. The 1938 and 1958 timetables had eight trains calling at Coombe Junction Monday to Friday, nine on Saturdays and six on Sundays.

Preceding station	National Rail	Following station
Reverses direction	Great Western Railway Looe Valley Line	Liskeard Terminus
Reverses direction	Great Western Railway Looe Valley Line	St Keyne Wishing Well Halt towards Looe

== Community rail ==
The railway between Liskeard and Looe is designated as a community rail line and is supported by marketing provided by the Devon and Cornwall Rail Partnership. The line is promoted under the 'Looe Valley Line' name.
