= Sandplace =

Village in the United Kingdom

Coordinates: 50°23′N 4°28′W

Sandplace (Cornish: Tewesva) is a small village in the parish of Morval, located two miles north of Looe in Cornwall, Great Britain. It is situated on the B3254, the old Liskeard to Looe road which connects the A387 to the south. The village lies alongside the East Looe river and has been served by Sandplace railway station, on the Looe Valley Line since 1881.

== History ==
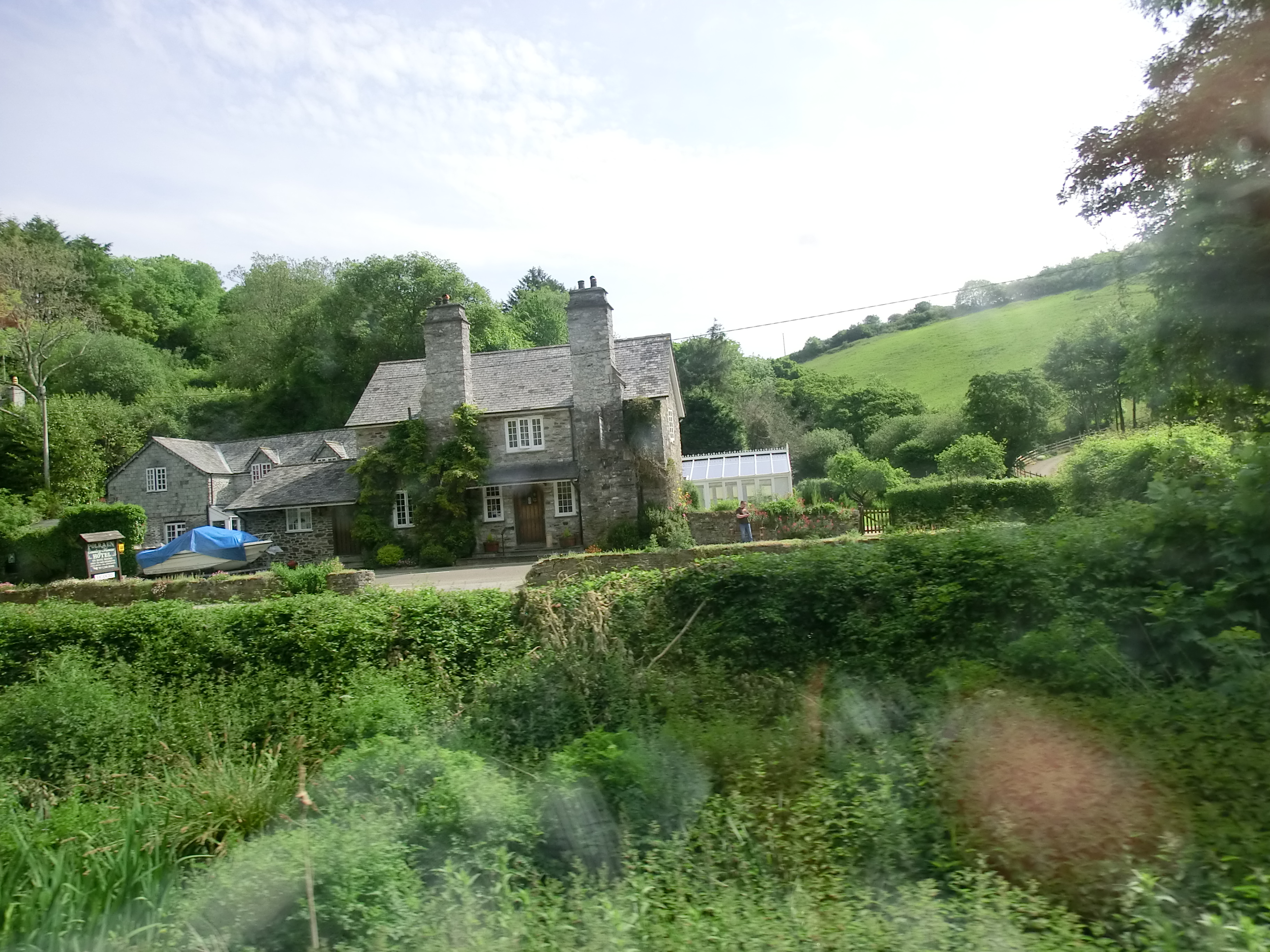
The Polraen Country House Hotel

Sandplace gets its name from a wharf on the river bank where sea-sand was stored.This, along with lime (imported from Plymouth and burnt in nearby kilns) was used to improve the acid soils of the area. The fertiliser was transported north out of the village on the Liskeard and Looe Union Canal which was completed in 1828. With the exploitation of copper and tin ores in the Caradon area from 1836 onwards, and the opening of the Liskeard and Caradon Railway in 1844, the canal was not able to cope with the traffic and congestion meant that trade was being lost to competing routes via Calstock and St Germans. A railway line was opened for goods between Moorswater and Looe on 27 December 1860, and the canal went into gradual decline, finally closing in 1910.

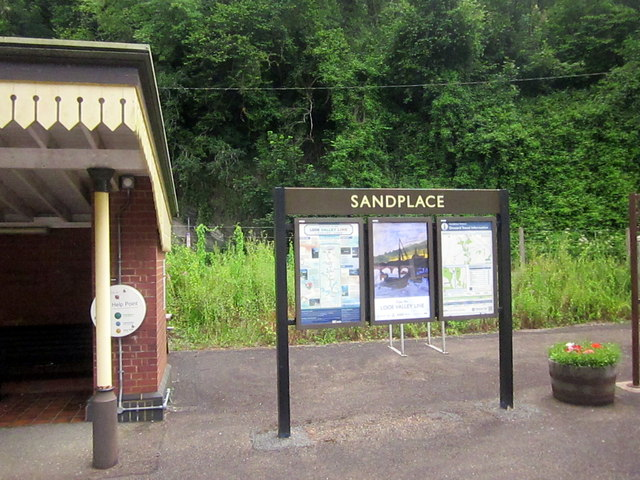
Sandplace Station Looe Branch Line

Within the village is a coaching inn, which was built around 1740 and is now the Polraen Country House Hotel. It was formerly owned by the Morval Estate, which sold it to Peter Bessell the Liberal MP for the Bodmin constituency. Bessell fled abroad in 1970 to avoid debts from a number of unsuccessful companies.
