= Liskeard and Looe Railway =

Railway line in Cornwall, England

Overview
- Status: Open
- Owner: Network Rail
- Locale: Cornwall
- Termini: Liskeard; Looe
- Stations: 6

Service
- Type: Branch line
- System: National Rail
- Operator: Great Western Railway

History
- Opened: 1860 (freight); 1879 (passengers)

Technical
- Number of tracks: 1

The Liskeard and Looe Railway was a railway originally built between Moorswater, in the valley west of Liskeard, and Looe, in Cornwall, England, UK, and later extended to Liskeard station on the Cornish Main Line railway. The first section was opened in 1860 and was owned by the Liskeard and Looe Union Canal Company, whose canal had earlier (from 1827) been built to convey sea sand and lime up the valley of the East Looe River, for the purpose of improving agricultural land.

When copper and tin ores were discovered on Caradon Hill, they were brought down to Looe Harbour over the canal; the volume of traffic became too much for the canal, and the railway was built. It was short of money and operated with a single hired locomotive at first, carrying minerals from Caradon to the sea at Looe, as well as coal and machinery, and some agricultural materials up the valley.

Passenger traffic was started in 1879, and at the same time mineral extraction was already declining. Seeing the disadvantage of being isolated from other railways, the Company built a connecting line between Moorswater and Liskeard station, on the main line; this was opened in 1901, and encouraged passenger and general goods traffic.

A peculiarity of the line is the circuitous route from Liskeard to Coombe, and the reversal there; there is a steep gradient to descend from Liskeard into the valley, and sharp curves.

The line remains open. Passenger trains are operated by Great Western Railway under the brand name "The Looe Valley Line".

== General description ==
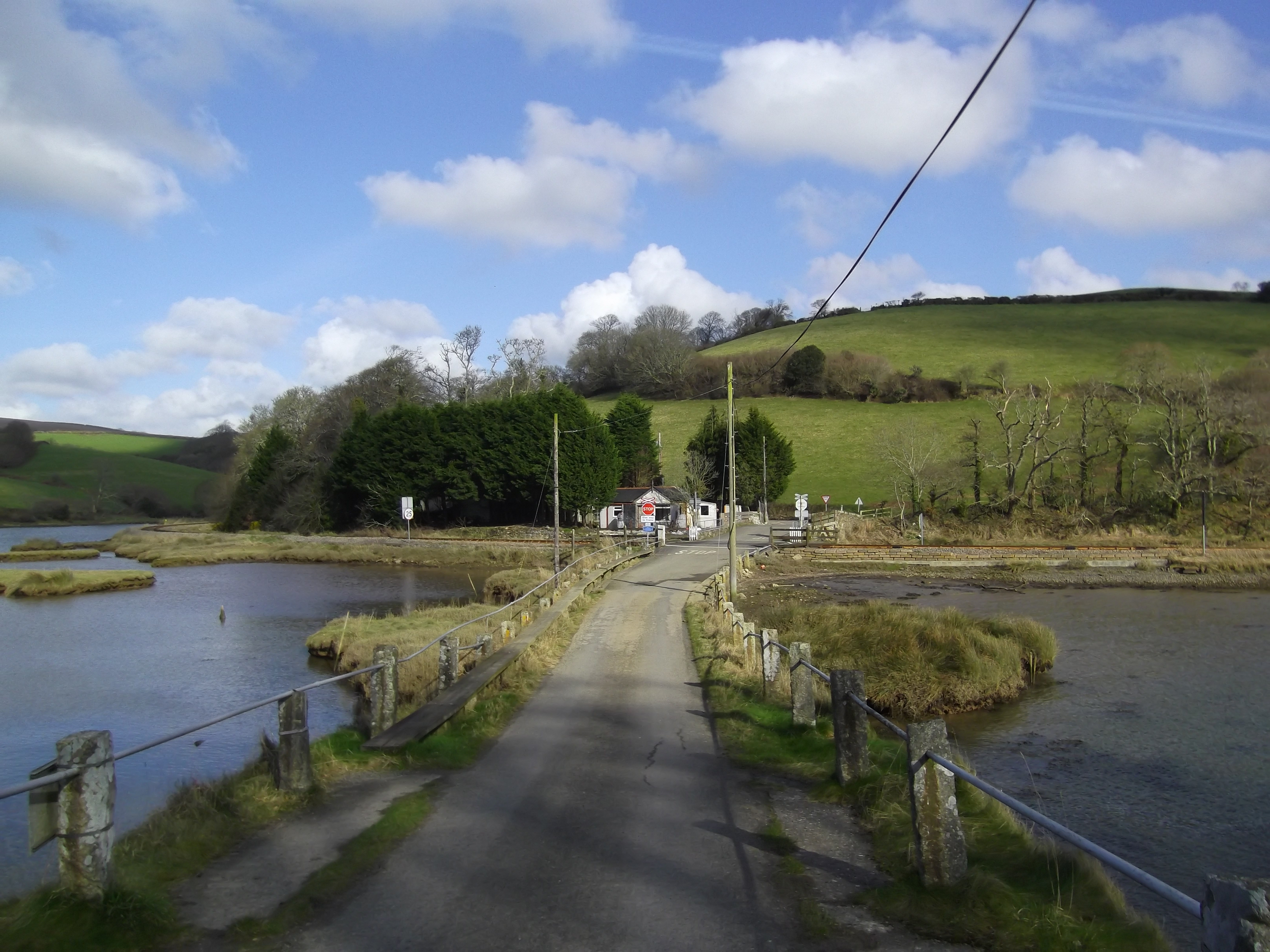
The Liskeard to Looe line at Terras level crossing from the causeway, looking east

The Liskeard and Looe Railway can nowadays be more conveniently thought of as the Looe Branch. It leaves Liskeard station (on the broadly east-west Plymouth to Penzance main line) in a northward direction, turning in a narrow sweep to pass southwards under the main line, continuing to turn to reach Coombe Junction, again facing north. The original line from Looe continued northwards for a short distance at this point to Moorswater, connecting there with the Liskeard and Caradon Railway; nowadays this is reduced to a stub leading to a nearby private siding at Moorswater.

Passenger trains to Looe reverse at Coombe, and from there the line runs southwards, descending along the valley of the East Looe River, with intermediate stations at St Keyne Wishing Well Halt, Causeland, and Sandplace, finally reaching Looe. The entire route is single line, but the junction at Coombe and the extension to Moorswater there mean that the section is divided for operational purposes.

== History ==
=== Origins ===
The agricultural land around Liskeard is of good quality, but tends to considerable acidity, and in the eighteenth and nineteenth century the best land was "improved" by spreading sea sand or lime on it, to neutralise the acidity. Large quantities of these commodities were required annually, and they were brought in from the coast by pack horse. In 1827 a canal – the Liskeard and Looe Union Canal – was constructed, between Sandplace on the East Looe River and Moorswater, in the valley west of Liskeard. The canal was moderately successful.

From 1836, copper and tin ores were discovered in the Caradon area, and had to be brought to the sea for onward transport to market. Packhorse conveyance to Moorswater meant that the Canal could be used for part of the journey, but the difficulties of horse transport between the mines and Moorswater soon led to plans for the construction of a railway. The Liskeard and Caradon Railway was built to bring the ores, and also granite, down to Moorswater. At Moorswater the minerals were transferred to barges, which transported them down the canal to Looe, from where coastal shipping took them to market.

Liskeard and Looe Railway Act 1858
- Act of Parliament
- Parliament of the United Kingdom
- Long title: An Act to empower the Liskeard and Looe Union Canal Company to construct a Railway from Moors Water to Looe, all in the County of Cornwall; and for other Purposes.
- Citation: 21 & 22 Vict. c. xi

Dates
- Royal assent: 11 May 1858

This brought considerable prosperity to the canal, and traffic volume rose, soon reaching the point where the canal was operating at full capacity. Consideration was then given to building a railway along the valley. A meeting held on 30 September 1857 confirmed this proposal, and a special general meeting of the canal company shareholders met on 13 October 1857; they agreed that they should build a railway. Legal powers to do so were given, in the Liskeard and Looe Railway Act 1858 (21 & 22 Vict. c. xi), on 11 May 1858. The act did not establish a company of that name: the powers to build the railway were conferred on the existing Liskeard and Looe Union Canal Company. £13,000 of additional share capital was sanctioned, with £4,000 of borrowing powers. Locomotive haulage was authorised, but locomotives were not to pass the end of Looe Bridge to reach Buller Quay on the level.

=== Construction ===
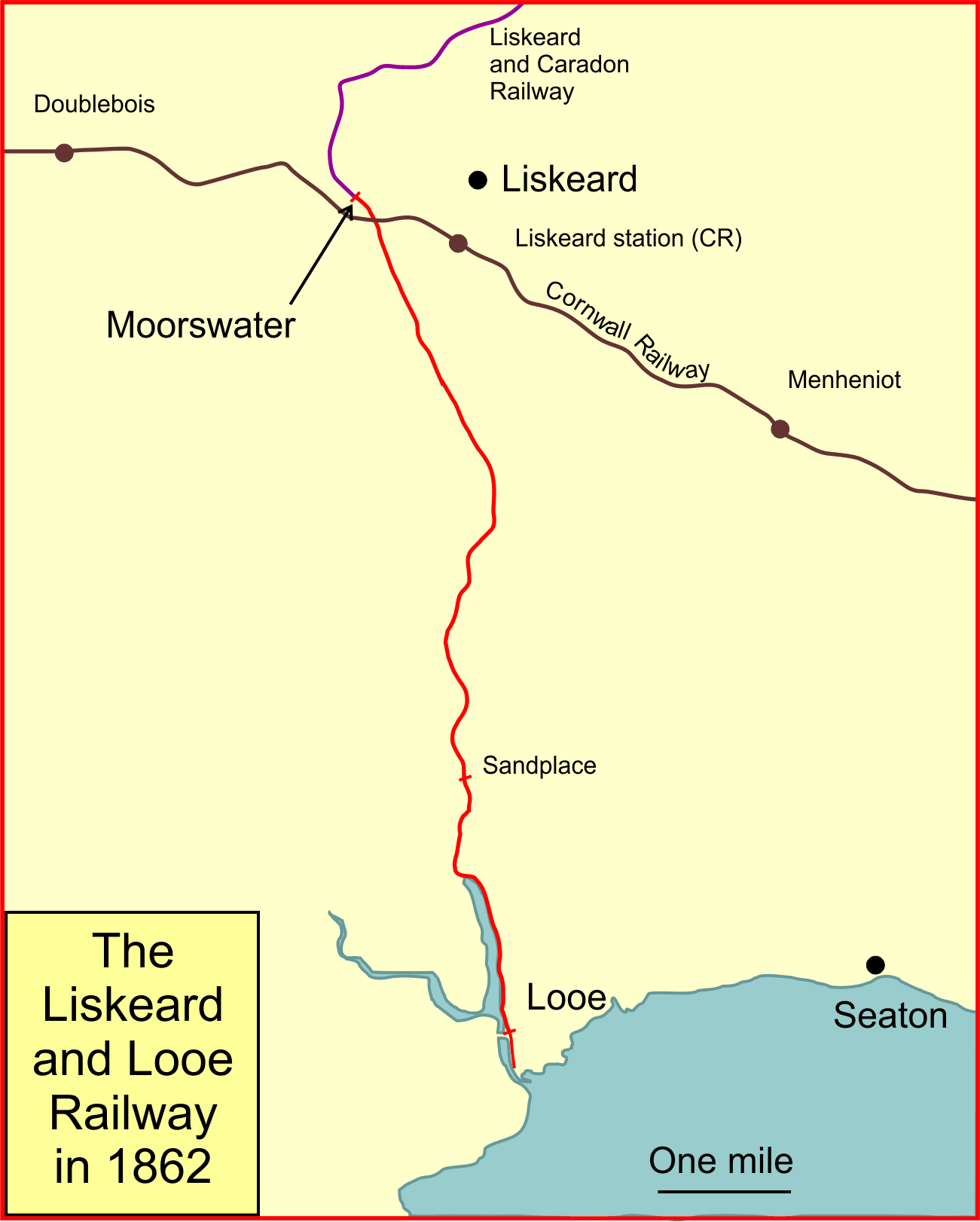
The Liskeard and Looe Railway in 1862

Contracts were let for the construction of the line, and land acquisition was put in hand. The railway was to be built alongside the canal; it is not clear whether the canal was intended to remain in use as well as the railway, or whether this was simply to avoid closing the canal during the railway construction period. Granite sleeper blocks (from Cheesewring) were used. In the Looe Valley from Tregarland to Looe longitudinal timbers were used instead. Granite blocks were obsolete technology at this period, although they had been used on the Liskeard and Caradon line, and longitudinal timbers were in use on the Cornwall Railway. Messenger suggests that the use of these forms of track construction was due to inexperience on the part of the engineers.

Construction costs considerably exceeded the authorised capital, and in July 1860 the managing committee instructed that the accommodation works (farm crossings etc.) should be postponed; arrangements were made with the L&CR to use their wagons and a small locomotive was hired in from James Murphy of Newport, Monmouthshire, for £3 per day including crew.

Amid much ceremony and jubilation the railway opened, for goods and mineral traffic only, on 27 December 1860.

The canal was retained in operation from Sandplace to Looe, as there was an important quay at Sandplace, but it is likely that the higher part of the canal became disused immediately.

=== Early operation ===
Initial operation from 1860 consisted of the use of the hired locomotive Liskeard taking the wagons of the Liskeard and Caradon Railway (L&CR) down to Looe. Liskeard was brought to the Liskeard station of the Cornwall Railway (no doubt on a wagon), and then hauled to Moorswater by a team of 28 horses.

In fact Liskeard served well, for it was purchased from Murphy for £600 in September 1861. The L&CR, planned as a gravity railway with horse traction for the uphill direction, saw the value of a locomotive, and acquired their own, Caradon in August (probably) of 1862.

It was realised that it made little sense to keep the two lines separate, and a Joint Committee had been formed in March 1862—the L&CR had three members to the LLUC's two. Through tolls from Caradon to Looe were published, and operational management of the two railways passed to the L&CR from 31 March 1862. The L&CR acquired the locomotive Liskeard, paying the LLUC the £600 it had paid for it.

Mineral traffic increased considerably, and the quayside at Looe became seriously congested. However, copper ore traffic peaked at 27,000 tons in 1863, declining afterwards. Inwards coal continued to climb, however, as the mines were exploiting deeper lodes, requiring more engine power for winding and to drain them. Granite held steady at 7,000 tons for several years, and limestone (inwards) held at about 4,000 tons.

At this time the L&CR was concerning itself with extending its line to new mines, as the focus of extraction shifted away from the earlier shaft locations. From time to time the L&CR also pursued the idea of reaching Launceston by constructing a long branch across the moors. The LLUC by contrast had little to do, their railway being managed by the L&CR. However, shortage of money was a continuing concern, and as some of the Caradon mines also faced financial difficulties, there was considerable pressure for a reduction in tolls.

=== Formal lease to the L&CR, and passengers carried ===
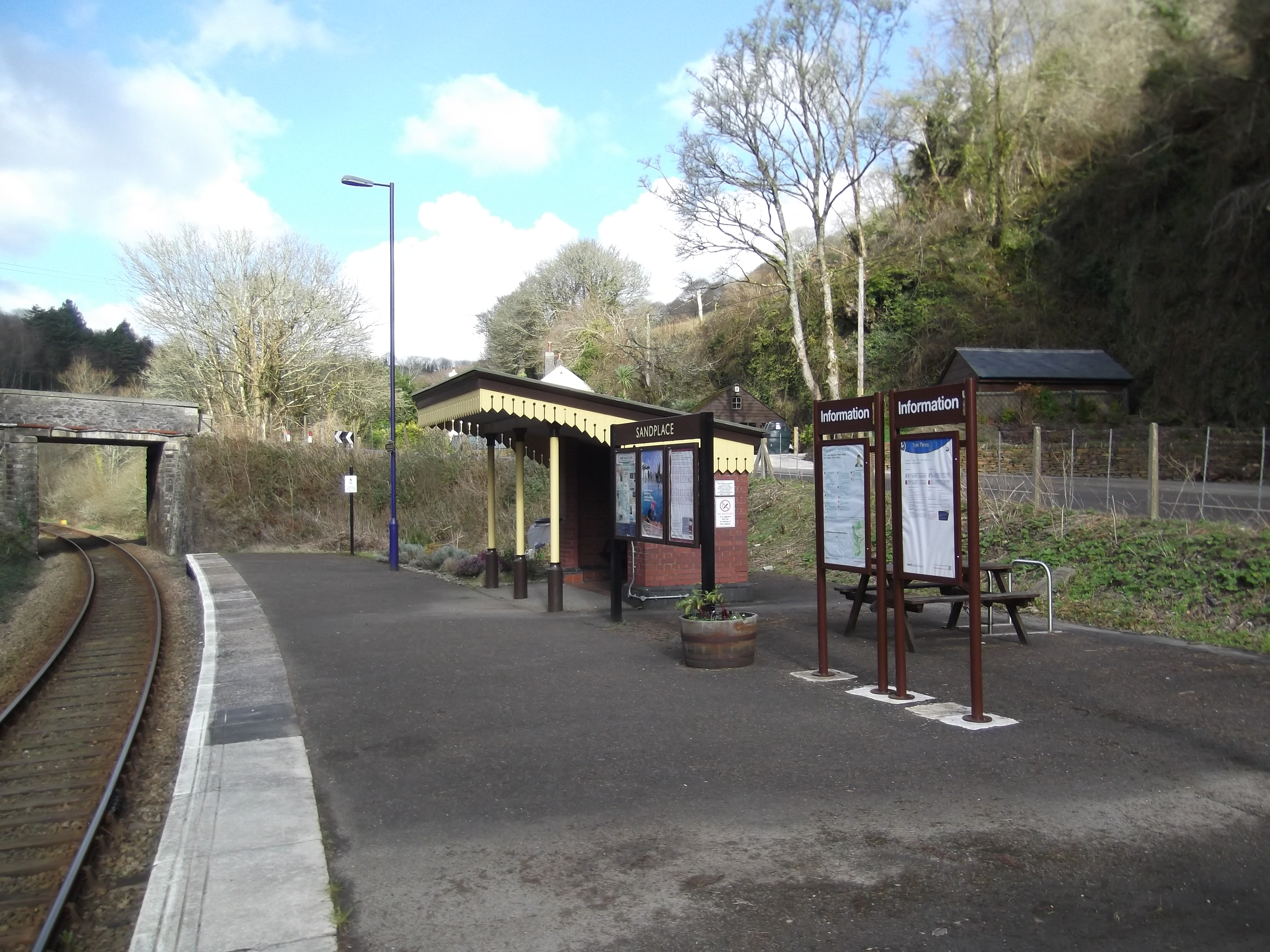
Sandplace station on the Liskeard to Looe line, looking north

The L&CR continued to have ambitious plans, and it planned to obtain parliamentary authority in 1882 to lease the LLUC's railway, as well as the construction of a line to Liskeard. The proposal fell through, possibly due to the reality of lack of cash, but a formal lease of the LLUC undertaking was made, effective from 27 February 1878. This evidently included control of the residual canal activity. This was ratified by a later act of Parliament, the Liskeard and Caradon Railway Act 1884 (47 & 48 Vict. c. cxcv) of 28 July 1884.

John Francis Buller had secured a promise when the LLUC's railway was constructed, that he could have a siding at Sandplace, where he had extensive interests. He now agitated for this promise to be fulfilled, and early in 1879 it was provided.

The carriage of passengers had been discussed from time to time, and individuals had been carried by express permission, for some time. Against a background of steadily declining mineral business, passenger traffic was started on 11 September 1879. Col. Rich of the Board of Trade had made an initial inspection in April 1879 and found that many improvements would be necessary to permit passenger operation, including proper station accommodation, and improvements and widening to several bridges. The works were quickly completed and on 7 September 1879 authorised passenger operation as a light railway; the line was to be worked under "One engine in steam" arrangements.

Liskeard and Looe Railway Extension Act 1895
- Act of Parliament
- Parliament of the United Kingdom
- Long title: An Act for authorising the Liskeard and Looe Union Canal Company to extend their Railway and for other purposes.
- Citation: 58 & 59 Vict. c. cviii

Dates
- Royal assent: 6 July 1895

Text of statute as originally enacted

The L&CR had funded the works for passenger operation, and took the receipts; in contrast the LLUC seemed somnolent, and it was the L&CR which obtained the Liskeard and Looe Railway Extension Act 1895 (58 & 59 Vict. c. cviii) authorising an extension to their railway to connect Moorswater to the Cornish main line of the Cornwall Railway at Liskeard. The act included several other more or less ambitious extensions, but the L&CR's finances were weak, and the Liskeard link was in fact never attempted by them.

=== Further decline of mineral traffic ===
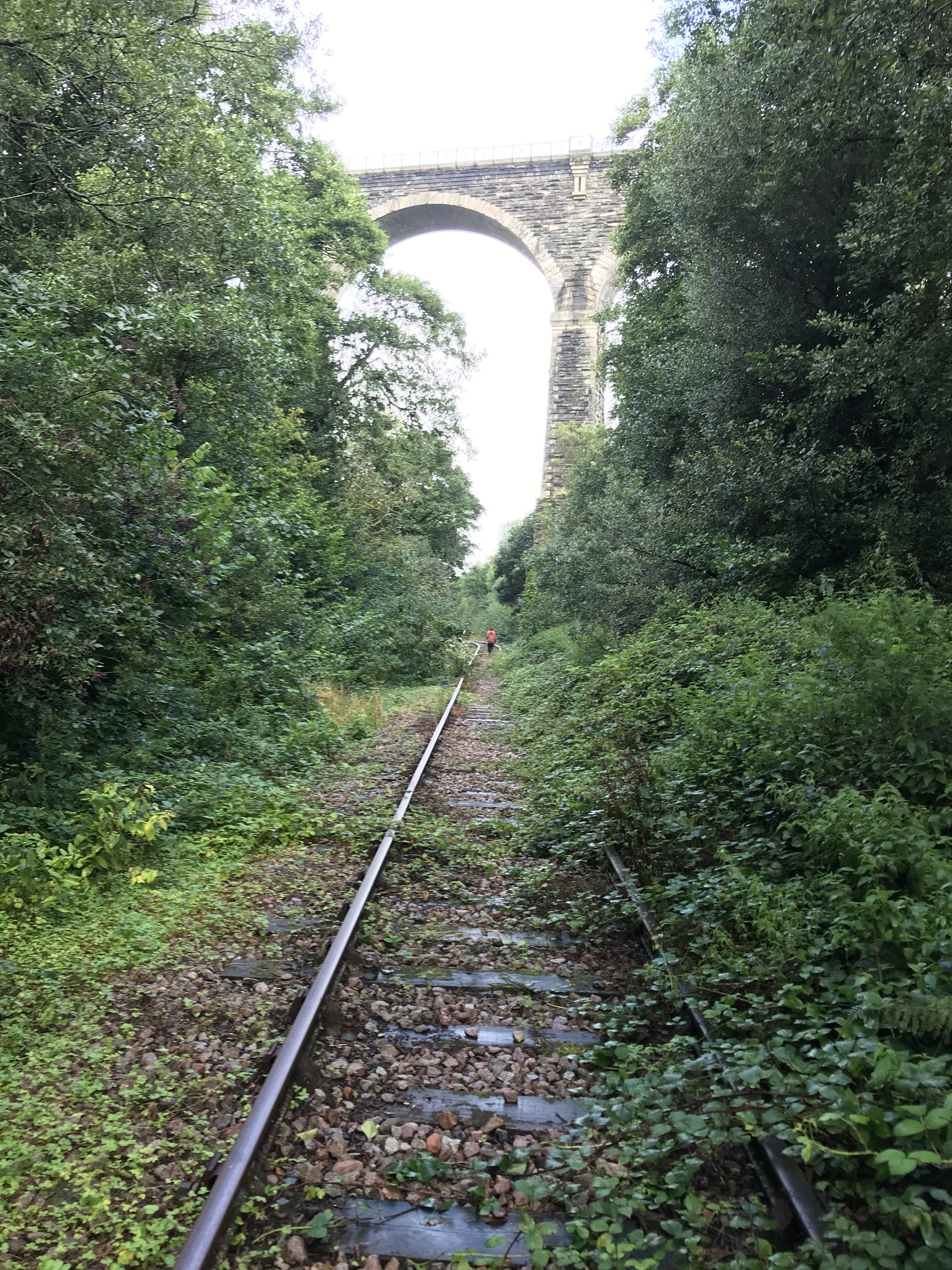
Abandoned track between Moorswater and Coombe

The early promise of mineral extraction from Caradon had now peaked, and difficult mining conditions, and the availability of cheaper minerals from overseas, led to serious decline in the industry. The L&CR had been in financial difficulty as a result, and in 1886 it defaulted on the lease payment of £1,350 to the LLUC. As a result, the LLUC was unable to make interest payments on its debentures, and dividends were impossible.

The L&CR instituted desperate economy measures and struggled on; In 1890 the Board of Trade took issue with the L&CR over operating methods on its own line, but also the use of mixed (passenger and goods) trains on the Looe line, with the passenger vehicles at the rear to facilitate shunting at the intermediate sidings. The Companies agreed to limit mixed train operation to one per day, but the placing of the passenger vehicles seems not to have been addressed.

=== Extension to Liskeard ===
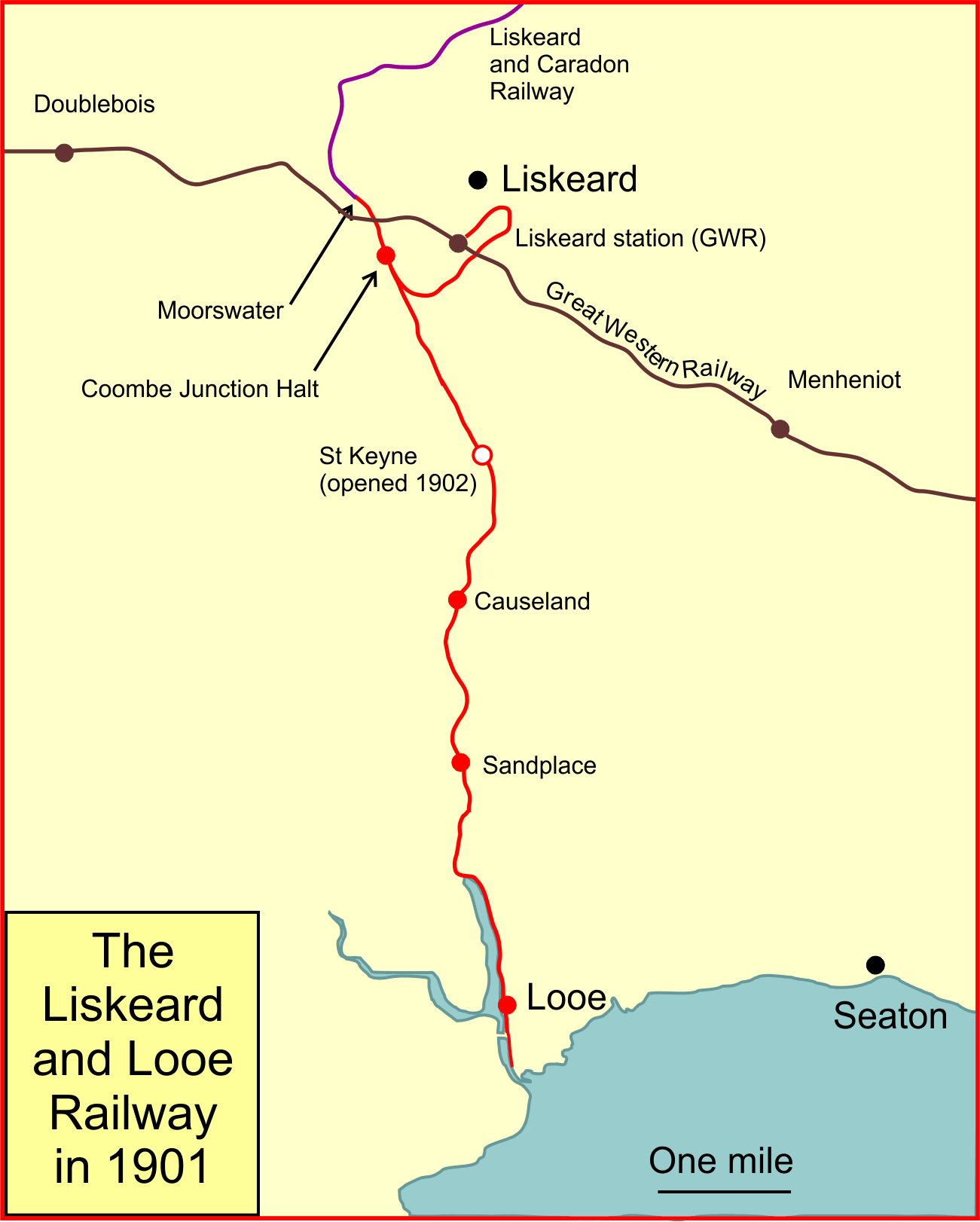
The Liskeard and Looe Railway in 1901

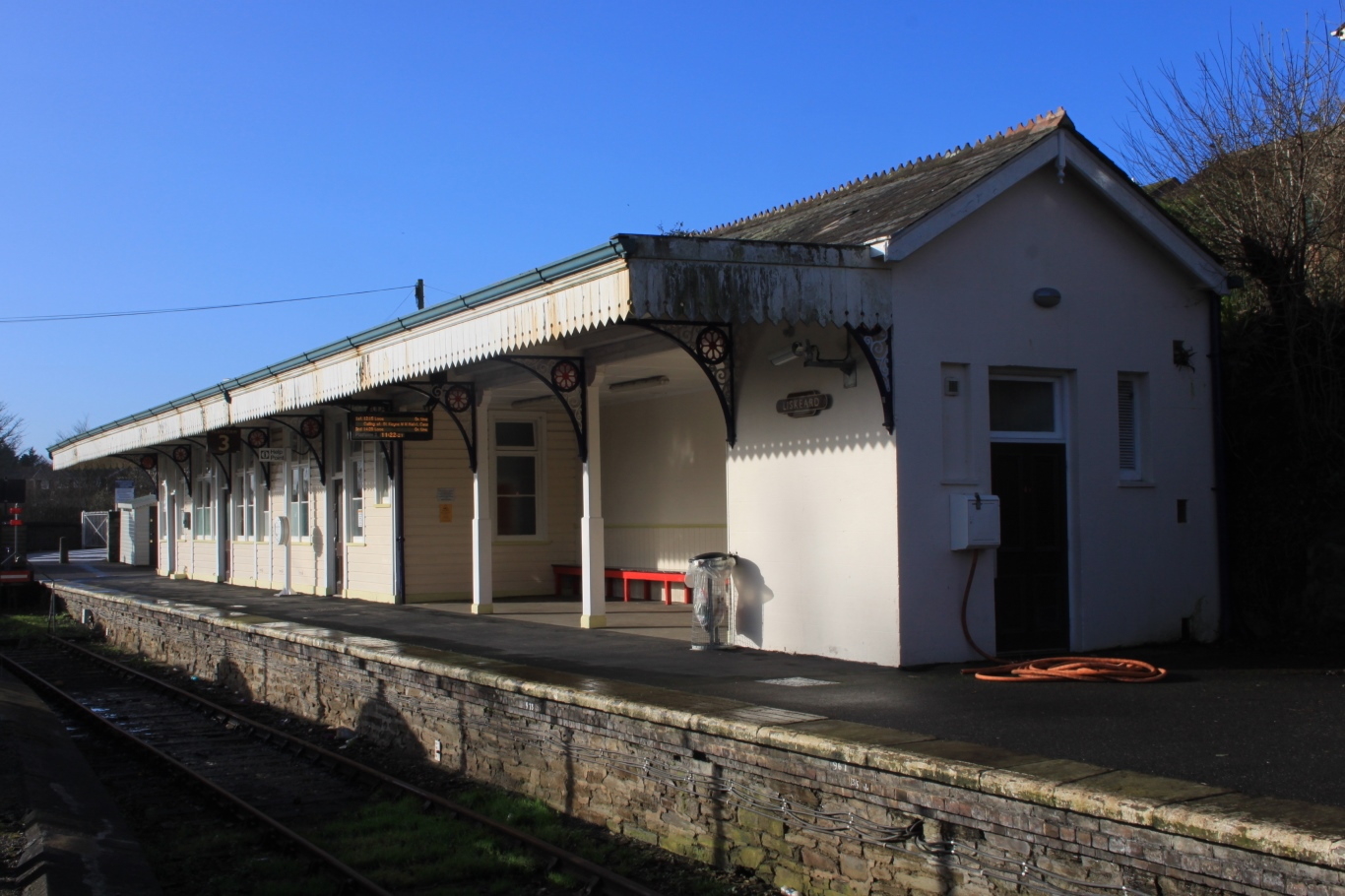
The platform for Looe at Liskeard

For many years, in fact from 1846, there had been proposals to link Moorswater with the Cornwall Railway at the high level in Liskeard, (Note: This was during the proposals for the Cornwall Railway itself) including a 1 in 7 rack railway.

Liskeard and Looe Railway Extension Act 1895
- Act of Parliament
- Parliament of the United Kingdom
- Long title: An Act for authorising the Liskeard and Looe Union Canal Company to extend their Railway and for other purposes.
- Citation: 58 & 59 Vict. c. cviii

Dates
- Royal assent: 6 July 1895

Text of statute as originally enacted

As passengers and non-mineral goods traffic became dominant, the disadvantages of the disconnected route and the inconveniently located Moorswater station motivated the company to act on making a connection to the main line at Liskeard. This became the Liskeard and Looe Extension Railway, when the Liskeard and Looe Railway Extension Act 1895 (58 & 59 Vict. c. cviii) obtained royal assent on 6 July 1895. The name of the company operating the Looe railway line had remained The Liskeard and Looe Union Canal Company and by the same act it was finally changed to The Liskeard and Looe Railway.

The line required £30,000 of share capital and progress stalled due to a lack of willing investors. The Great Western Railway were approached, but were discouraging, and an impasse had been reached, until Captain J. E. P. Spicer, of Spye Park, personally invested the bulk of the capital. Construction started on 28 June 1898.

The vertical interval—205 feet—and the topography in general made the connection awkward, and a tortuous route was built, running in nearly a full circle. The Lodge Hill cutting through rock was one of the deepest in the county. The ruling gradient was 1 in 40 and the sharpest curve 8 chains (160m). Because of the steep gradient, locomotives worked chimney first to Liskeard, to ensure that the firebox crown remained covered with water. The line terminated in a south facing bay platform at Liskeard. The connection between the branch line there and the main line was a sharply curved siding.

The new line opened on 9 May 1901. A new station at Coombe, near the point of junction with the Looe line, was opened on 15 May 1901 and the line north of that station to Moorswater was closed to passenger traffic on that day.

The new connection had a most encouraging immediate effect on business, both passenger and goods, and by the end of the decade receipts had trebled compared with the year prior to opening of the connection.

=== Take over by the Great Western Railway ===
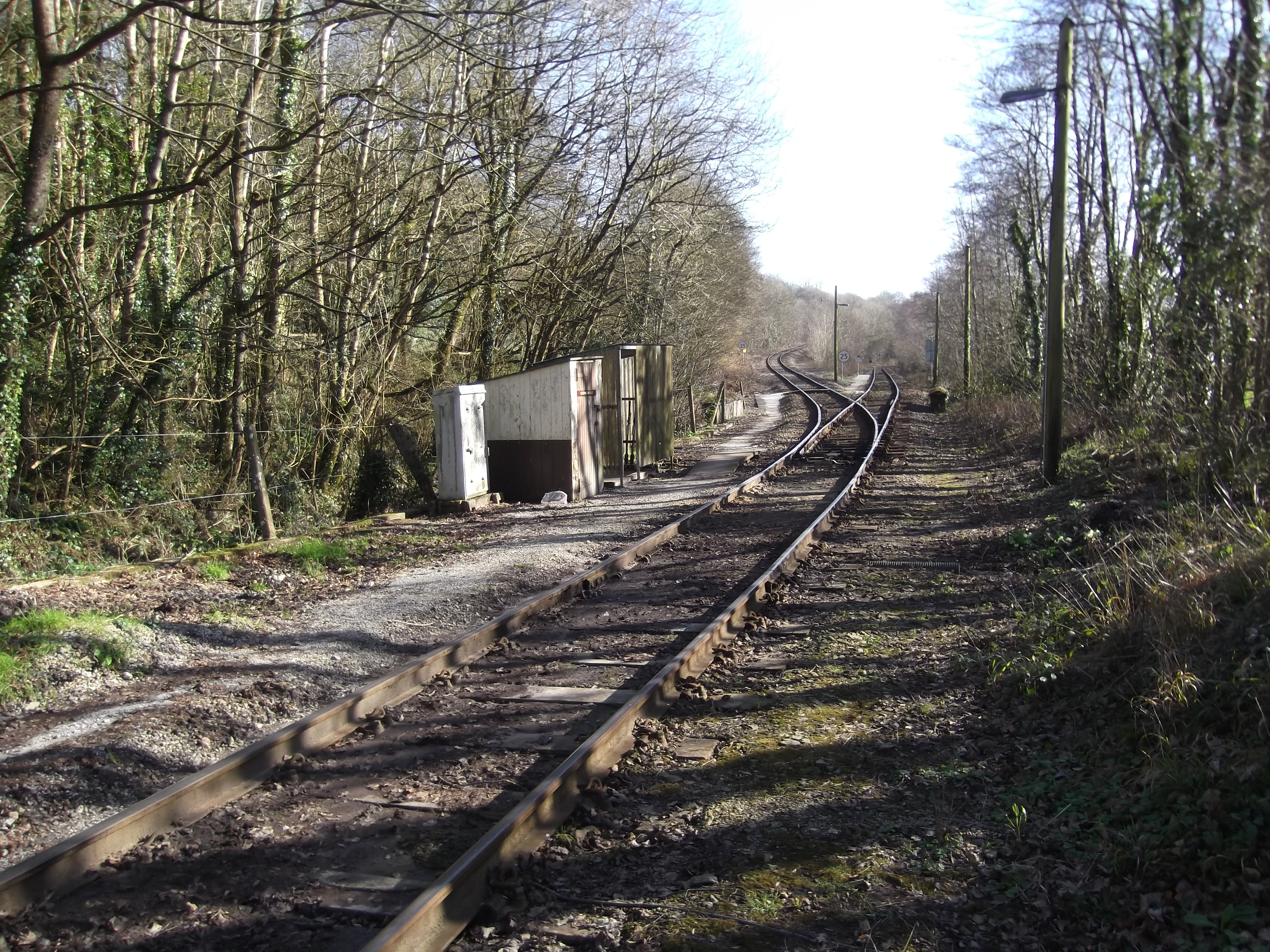
Coombe Junction looking towards Looe; the line to Liskeard climbs to the left

The Great Western Railway (GWR) worked the line (and the Liskeard and Caradon Railway) from 1909, authorised by the Great Western Railway, Liskeard and Looe, and Liskeard and Caradon Railways Act 1909 (9 Edw. 7. c. xiii), and the GWR absorbed the line at the Grouping of the Railways in 1923, under the Railways Act 1921. At the end of independent existence the Liskeard and Looe company was quoted as having issued share capital of £90,000 and a net income (for the fiscal year 1921) of £1,213.

In the twentieth century, the line had made the transition from mineral railway to conventional branch line with passenger and agricultural and fisheries goods traffic dominant. There were typically seven return passenger trains on the line, with a Sunday service in addition.

There were signalboxes at Liskeard (branch), Coombe Junction, and Looe. That at Looe was a very small structure at the Quay end of the platform, controlling onward movement to the sidings there.

However the awkward connection at Liskeard and the reversal at Coombe made operation inconvenient. Moreover, through trains, or even through carriages, would have been very difficult to arrange, and they were never operated, due to the sharp connecting curve at Liskeard and the restricted loading gauge on the branch.

Steam passenger train operation required running round at Coombe, and from the 1930s branch trains passed each other there. This seems remarkable as there was only one short platform at Coombe, but at least until the end of steam operation this took place, typically with a Liskeard to Looe train calling at Coombe at 10:02 to 10:07 and a Looe to Liskeard train calling there at 10:06 to 10:09. How this was achieved is explained below.

Becket states that in clear weather authority was given for trains climbing up the steep and sharply curved 1 in 40 section from Coombe to Liskeard to be assisted in rear, and that this was usually done by the train engine that had brought the train from Looe to Coombe.

The line was classified as "uncoloured" for engine restriction purposes, but special authority was given for 45XX 2-6-2T locomotives (classified "yellow"), 90XX 4-4-0s (classified "blue") and 0-6-0PTs 9700 to 9710 (also "blue"). In practice the line was in the hands of the 45XXs. Two were based at the sub-shed at Moorswater.

=== A proposed new branch from St Germans to Looe ===
As the branch increased in popularity, especially with summer holidaymakers, the Great Western Railway considered constructing a new seven-mile branch from Trerulefoot, near St Germans, to Looe, in the 1930s. This was coupled with an awareness of the development of daily occupational travel to Plymouth: a 35-minute journey was planned, enabling "commuting" in modern parlance. A map of the proposed route is shown at Saltash and Tamar Valley History

This new line became a firm proposal in 1936, authorised under the Great Western Railway (Additional Powers) Act in that year. The line would have traversed difficult topography, and it would have included three tunnels, including a Seaton Tunnel at 2,288 yards (2,092 m), and a Looe Tunnel at 700 yards (640 m); there was to be a new high level station on the east side of Looe town. The line was to be operated by the new streamlined diesel railcars, giving a 35-minute journey for the 16 miles to Plymouth. A halt was envisaged at Millendreath; from it a carriage road led steeply uphill to the proposed site of a large luxury hotel designed by Lutyens. The intention was for it to become a major leisure resort, and to that end a golf links, designed by Franks, Harris Bros Ltd, was completed in 1938; remnants of the course are still visible, although on private property. Some preparatory work was carried out on the first 4 mi (6.4 km) between Looe and Keveral in 1937, but the Second World War delayed the construction of both the line and the hotel, and with nationalisation after the war the plans were never carried out. The junction would have been at Trerule, on the Cornish main line. The signal box there was enlarged in preparation, although only six levers were in use.

== Route ==
The railway is measured from a zero milepost adjacent to Looe Bridge, between the railway station and the Looe Harbour Commissioners' sidings at Buller Quay. For most of its distance it follows the valley of the East Looe River more or less northwards.

The signal box at Looe was at the station 15 ch (0.30 km) from the zero milepost. The line then continues through Sandplace at 2 mi 28 ch (3.8 km), Causeland at 3 mi 58 ch (6.0 km), and St Keyne at 5 mi 3 ch (8.1 km). The physical junction at Coombe is at 6 mi 50 ch (10.7 km) from Looe but is measured as 6 mi 74 ch (11.1 km) for trains towards Liskeard to allow for the additional 12 chains to and 12 chains from Coombe Junction Halt where the trains reversed. The halt is at 6 mi 62 ch (10.9 km). The northern extent line at Moorswater after the Caradon line closed is at 7 mi 23 ch (11.7 km). The private siding for the china clay company at Moorswater starts at 7 mi 19 ch (11.6 km).

The branch line platform buffer stop at Liskeard railway station is at 8 mi 67 ch (14.2 km).

== Stations ==
The original route was from Looe Quay to Moorswater; the former is sometimes quoted as Looe Bridge, the southern extremity of the running line, but it ran on as sidings to the quayside south of the bridge, on Buller Quay. The line was opened to passenger services on 11 September 1879, and ran two trains each way daily to connect with the Cornwall line; there was an additional train on Saturday evenings.

Passenger stations
Station	From Looe	Location	Opened
Looe	0 mi 0 ch (0 km)	50.3580°N 4.4553°W	1879
Sandplace	2 mi 13 ch (3.5 km)	50.3877°N 4.4648°W	1881
Causeland	3 mi 43 ch (5.7 km)	50.4058°N 4.4664°W	1879
St Keyne	4 mi 68 ch (7.8 km)	50.4229°N 4.4633°W	1902
Coombe Junction	6 mi 38 ch (10.4 km)	50.4449°N 4.4811°W	1901
Moorswater	6 mi 68 ch (11.0 km)	50.4505°N 4.4850°W	1879

=== Looe ===
The passenger station was built in the area near East Looe known as Shutta, some distance above Looe Bridge. When it opened on 11 September 1879 it consisted of a single platform 75 feet (23 m) long, with basic facilities. The platform was extended to 200 feet (61 m) when the link at Liskeard was opened in 1901, and it was extended again by 96 feet (29 m) in 1928. Arriving passenger trains moved to run-round facilities south of the station for the purpose, where there was also a carriage shed, and then re-entered the platform.

Passenger trains were operated by diesel multiple units from 11 September 1961 and goods traffic ceased in November 1963. After this the running line ended in buffer stops at the platform end. This was shortened back at the south end in 1966 and again in April 1968.

The line southwards to the Quay crossed Polperro Road (the road on Looe Bridge) on the level; it extended as far as the site of the present Buller Street. It was named Buller Quay after J F Buller, a prominent local landowner who "arranged the funding for the quay construction from various sources". The harbour lines were closed in 1954.

China Clay was exported from the quay between 1904 and the 1920s, declining because of the restriction on vessel size due to rocks at the mouth of the Looe; Fowey took over the traffic. The Quay closed to rail traffic on 23 March 1954.

=== Sandplace ===
This opened in December 1881. It was proposed for closure in 1907, but the proposal was not implemented. Goods were handled there in a loop siding on the east side of the line until 15 June 1951.

=== Causeland ===
This was the only intermediate station on the line when it opened for passengers in 1879. It is remote from any local settlement, and in 1881 and again in 1902, when adjacent stations as Sandplace and St Keyne respectively were opened, the Company proposed to close it, but local opposition succeeded on stopping the proposal.

Mitchell and Smith show a photograph with stacked wood "prepared for the furniture industry" stacked on the platform, waiting to be loaded to a train for onward carriage.

=== St Keyne ===
The opening date is unclear but was in either September or October 1902. For many years it had the description 'for St Keyne Well' on its station sign. It was renamed St Keyne Wishing Well Halt early in 2008.

=== Coombe Junction ===
By 1896 Coombe was being used as an unadvertised passenger stop as early as 1884. The walk from Moorswater to Liskeard was steep and lengthy, and a basic stopping place at Coombe gave a somewhat easier walk to the main line station. The Coombe Junction station was provided when the link line to Liskeard was opened on 15 May 1901. A loop line of 650 feet (200 m) was provided, and passenger services northward to Moorswater ceased. The platform was 90 feet (27 m) long, on a dead-end road with the running line to Moorswater alongside; there was a crossover at the north end and until 1938 there was a middle crossover.

From abolition of the signal box on 8 May 1981, the level crossing there was converted to user operation, and two ground frames were provided at Coombe; No 1 ground frame controlling the junction points, and No 2 ground frame at the north end of passenger operation, controlling trap points from Moorswater.

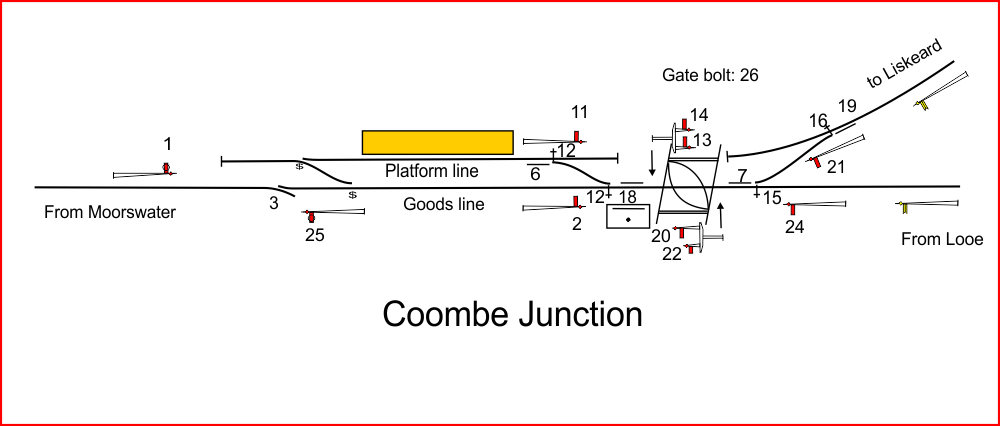
Track layout at Coombe Junction in the 1950s

From the 1930s until the end of steam operation, the passenger train timetable involved two trains crossing at Coombe Junction, at a little after 10.00 a.m. The layout at Coombe in the 1950s had only the terminal platform line and the through Goods Line (with no platform) towards Moorswater but both passenger trains had to use the single platform.

Since the closure of the signal box working from Coombe Junction to Looe is by train staff under "one train only" regulations. The electric train token between Liskeard and Coombe Junction has a key attached to operate the ground frame at Coombe Junction, so that the junction points there can be operated by the train crew.

In recent years, most trains on the branch have not made passenger calls at Coombe, and they make the reversal at the point of junction some distance south of the actual Halt. It was renamed Coombe from 1969 and Coombe Junction Halt from 2008.

=== Moorswater ===
This was originally the northern terminal of the canal, and the southern terminal of the Liskeard and Caradon Railway, and became the connecting point between the two railways when the Liskeard and Looe Railway was built. It is now on a short freight-only stub north of Coombe. As of October 2025 it is currently unused.

As the original terminal of the line, it had a carriage shed, a workshop, and an engine shed; the engine shed remained in use until 10 September 1961. The passenger station had a platform 84 feet (26 m) long. It closed to passengers when the link line opened, on 15 May 1901, and ordinary goods facilities ceased in May 1951.

The reservoir provided for the canal was in the fork between the Caradon line and the clay dries siding; it was still present (as "Old Reservoir") when the 1901 Ordnance Survey map was produced.

In the twentieth century there was a clay drying shed at Moorswater. The clay arrived as a slurry, piped from Parsons Park, four miles (6.4 km) north. The Network Rail Sectional Appendix quotes "Clay Dries" at this location. China clay was loaded there for onward rail transit until April 1997; after that date the Moorswater stub became disused until June 1999 when cement trains started to use it although these have since ceased.

== Train services ==
An 1881 public timetable shows two return journeys daily, with an additional train on Wednesdays and Saturdays; the journey time was 30 minutes; the fare was 6½d (6½ pence) third class, 9d (nine pence) second class and 1/6 (one shilling and sixpence) first class.

In 1893 there were two return journeys daily, with two additional trains on Wednesdays.

== Traction and rolling stock ==
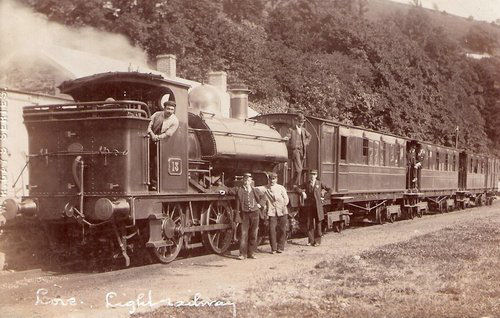
GWR 4-4-0ST 13 at Looe about 1905

As already mentioned the locomotive Liskeard, an 0-4-0ST, operated on the line from the first. From 1862 the Liskeard and Caradon Railway worked the line, taking over Liskeard for the purpose. It ceased operation on the line in August 1866. An 0-6-0ST called Caradon was purchased from Gilkes, Wilson & Co in 1862, working until 1907. A 2-4-0T called Lady Margaret also worked on the line. This was taken over by the GWR in the merger, numbered 1308, and worked thereafter principally in Wales, just lasting into British Railways times, being withdrawn in 1948.

An 0-6-0ST called Looe was obtained in May 1901, funded by a director; however its steaming capabilities proved inadequate for the steep climb at Liskeard, and it was sold on to the London and India Docks Company in April 1902; it worked there until 1950. To replace Looe, 4-4-0ST, No. 13, was hired from the GWR. After 1909 the line was worked by the GWR, and their own 0-6-0STs and 0-6-0PTs were in use. From the late 1920s, the 44XX 2-6-2T locomotives took over, supplemented by the larger wheeled 45XX class.

Coaching stock, required from the start of passenger operation in 1879, consisted of three four-wheeled coaches from the Metropolitan Carriage and Wagon Co. A further four-wheeler was acquired in 1880; continuous vacuum brakes were added in 1890.

With the opening of the connection to Liskeard GWR, three new passenger coaches were acquired from Hurst Nelson of Motherwell. They consisted of a composite first and second, and two third class vehicles. They were eight-wheel bogie coaches, and the seating was on the open plan (not compartments) with an American-style verandah at each end of the coach; they were said to be similar to coaches used on the New York Overhead Railway. The three coaches were almost completely destroyed in an accident on 15 April 1906.

At this time the Mersey Railway was disposing of locomotive hauled stock, and some of this was bought in as replacements; down to 1907, thirteen four wheelers were obtained second-hand from the Mersey Railway.

Mitchell and Smith show a photograph from the late 1920s with smart clerestory eight-wheelers, which "probably had been retired from main line use".
