= Looe Valley Line =

Community railway in east Cornwall, England

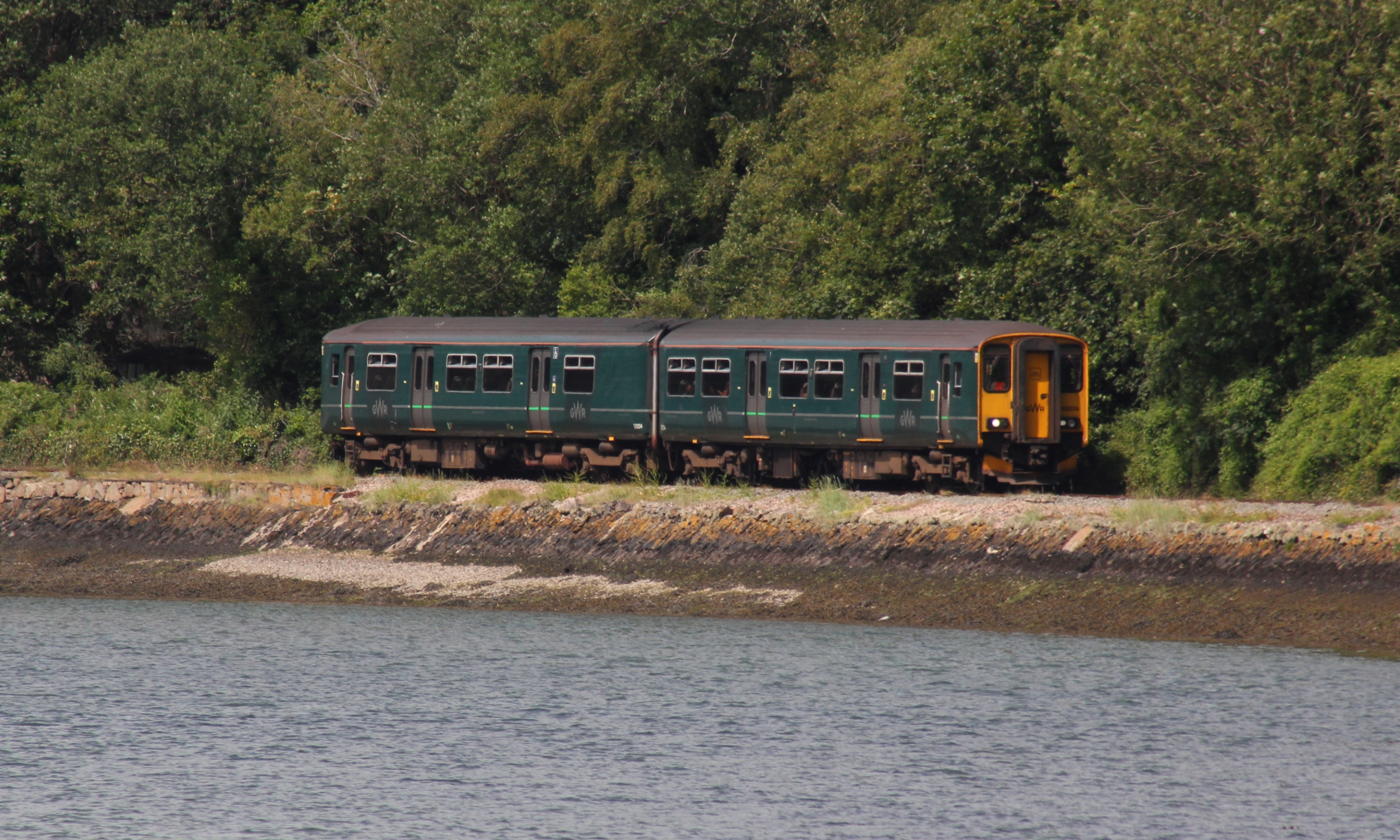
- A Class 150 train running beside the East Looe River

Overview
- Status: Open
- Owner: Network Rail
- Locale: Cornwall
- Termini: Liskeard 50.4469°N 4.4675°W; Looe 50.3594°N 4.4562°W
- Stations: 6

Service
- Type: Heavy rail
- System: National Rail
- Operator: Great Western Railway
- Rolling stock: Class 150

History
- Opened: 1860–1901

Technical
- Line length: 8 3/4 miles (14 km)
- Number of tracks: 1
- Character: Community railway
- Track gauge: 4 ft 8 1/2 in (1,435 mm)
- Loading gauge: RA4 / W6A
- Operating speed: 10 mph (16 km/h) - 30 mph (48 km/h)
Route map
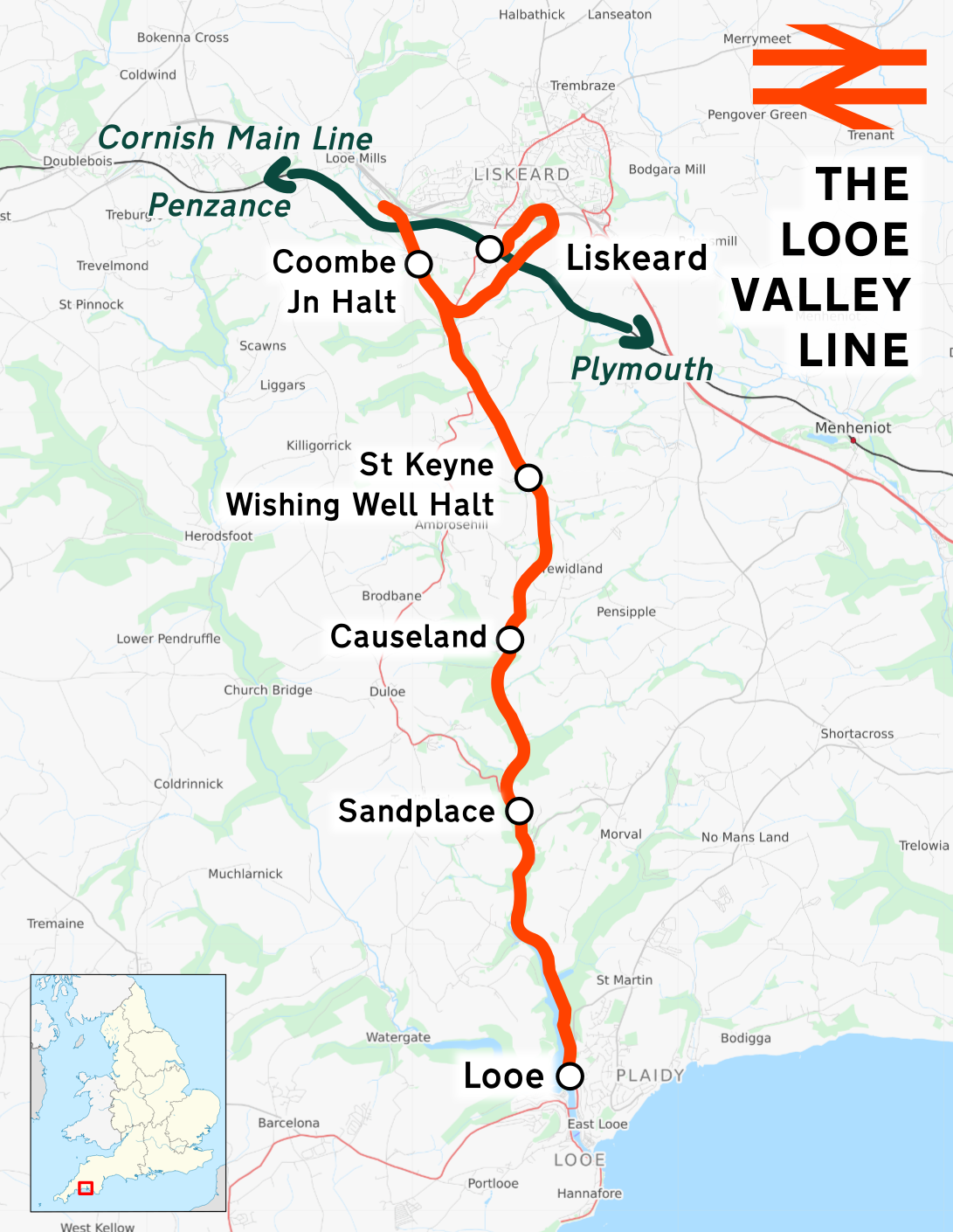
(Click to expand)

The Looe Valley Line is an 8 3/4-mile (14 km) community railway from Liskeard to Looe in Cornwall, England, that follows the valley of the East Looe River for much of its course. It is operated by Great Western Railway.

== History ==
The Looe Valley Line was opened as the Liskeard and Looe Railway on 27 December 1860 from a station at Moorswater, a little west of Liskeard, to the quayside at Looe, replacing the earlier Liskeard and Looe Union Canal. At Moorswater it connected with the Liskeard and Caradon Railway which conveyed granite from quarries on Bodmin Moor.

Passenger services commenced on 11 September 1879, but the Moorswater terminus was inconvenient as it was remote from Liskeard and a long way from the Cornwall Railway station on the south side of the town. On 15 May 1901 the railway opened a curving link line from Coombe Junction, a little south of Moorswater, to the now Great Western Railway station at Liskeard. The section from Coombe Junction to Moorswater was closed to passenger traffic on the same day but passenger numbers tripled. The new connecting line had to climb a considerable vertical interval to reach the Cornish Main Line which passed above Moorswater on a 147 feet (45m) high viaduct. The Liskeard and Looe Railway was taken over by the Great Western Railway in 1909 and the attractive seaside resort of Looe became heavily promoted as a holiday destination in the railway's publicity.

The section beyond Looe station to the quay was closed in 1916 and the Caradon line north of Moorswater fell out of use at around the same time.

In 1966 the line was due to be closed under Richard Beeching's Reshaping of Britain's Railways plan, but was reprieved just two weeks before its scheduled closure by Minister of Transport Barbara Castle.

=== Community rail ===
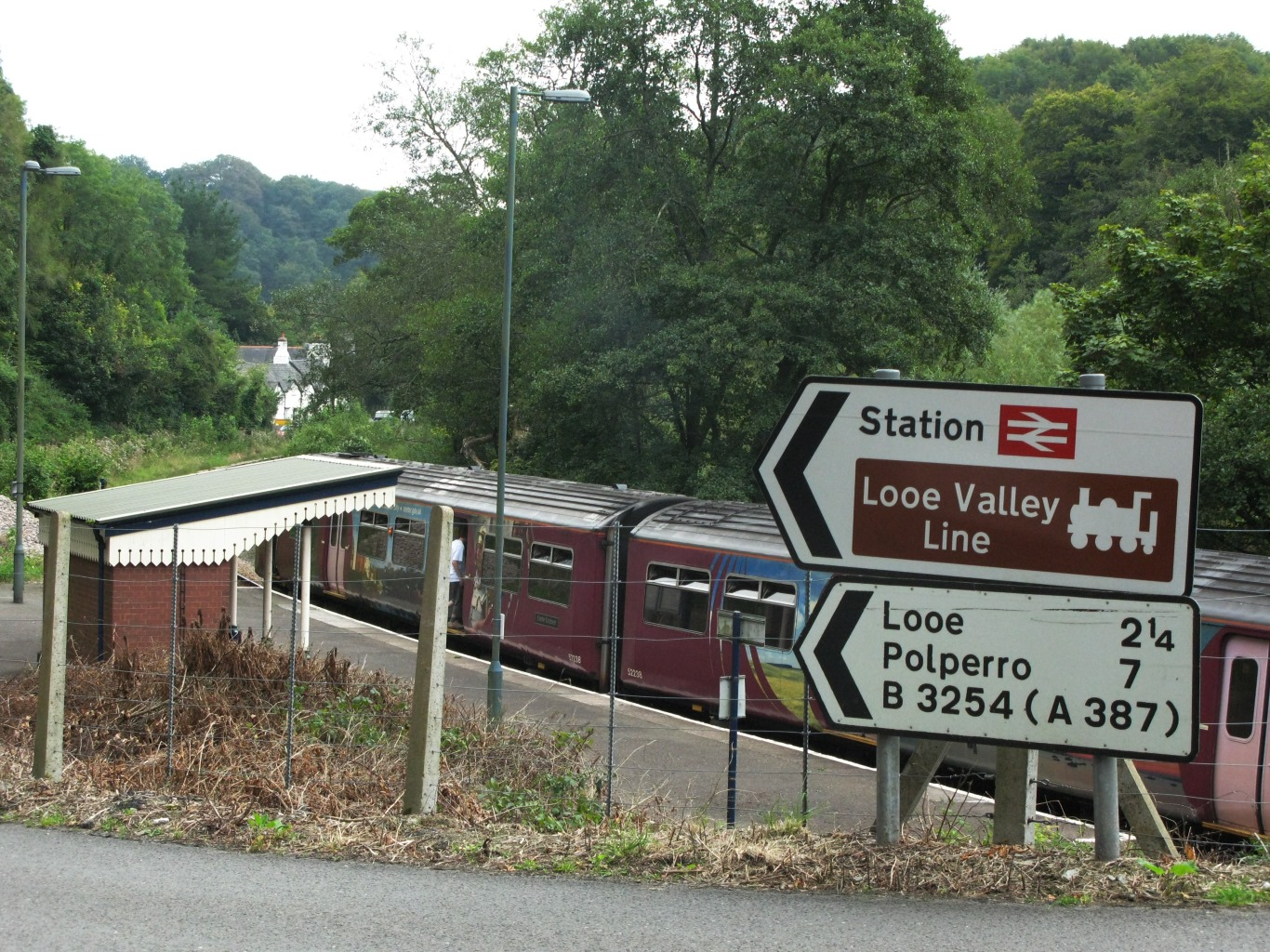
Looe Valley Line road sign at Sandplace

Since 1992 the Looe Valley Line has been one of the railway lines promoted by the Devon and Cornwall Rail Partnership. The line is promoted by many means such as regular timetable and scenic line guides, as well as leaflets highlighting leisure opportunities such as walking, birdwatching, and visiting country pubs. The Looe Valley Line Rail Ale Trail was launched early in 2004 and encourages rail travellers to visit eight pubs near the line. Five of these are in Looe, two in Liskeard, and one in Duloe, a 30-minute walk from Causeland station. Eight stamps collected in the Rail Ale Trail entitle the participant to claim special Looe Valley Line Rail Trail souvenir tour shirt.

The line was designated as a community rail line in September 2005, being one of seven pilots for the Department for Transport's Community Rail Development Strategy. This aims to establish the true costs and revenues for the line with an aim of improving them. It is also looking at simplifying the reversal of trains, considering the costs and benefits should the line be "microfranchised" separately from the Great Western Franchise, and the potential for opening a Park and Ride station at Moorswater where the goods sidings are close to the A38 Liskeard Bypass.

In 2007 the signs on the Looe Valley platform at Liskeard were replaced with brown and cream signs in the style used by the Western Region of British Railways in the 1950s and 1960s. In 2019 the Devon and Cornwall Rail Partnership launched a heritage project about the line which told the story of its history through archive information and engaging with the local community. The project won Best Community Engagement Project at the National Community Rail Awards in 2019.

== Passenger volume ==
The majority of Looe Valley passengers travel the whole length of the line with Causeland being the busiest intermediate station. The line has seen some good growth over the years with incremental improvements to the service.

Station usage
Station name	2002–03	2004–05	2005–06	2006–07	2007–08	2008–09	2009–10	2010–11	2011–12	2012–13	2013–14	2014–15	2015–16	2016–17	2017–18	2018–19	2019–20	2020–21	2021–22	2022–23	2023–24	2024–25
Coombe Junction Halt	71	96	59	32	54	128	42	38	60	48	42	26	48	212	156	204	188	28	112	120	140	224
St Keyne Wishing Well Halt	1,150	1,053	606	618	614	986	936	1,072	1,062	980	1,362	1,986	1,582	1,530	1,302	1,334	1,070	360	1,500	1,524	1,506	1,586
Causeland	2,099	2,281	2,671	3,035	3,471	4,038	3,652	2,674	3,366	2,544	2,198	2,094	1,976	1,736	1,834	1,620	1,336	504	2,040	1,588	1,800	2,108
Sandplace	1,206	1,429	865	788	946	1,158	1,148	1,032	1,422	1,486	1,860	1,762	1,316	1,418	1,780	1,274	1,302	828	1,316	1,154	1,006	966
Looe	72,418	75,510	70,880	81,022	76,527	82,614	88,520	100,130	119,364	106,462	118,238	124,914	117,014	123,060	118,308	117,506	118,642	37,552	118,302	115,260	111,216	119,600
The annual passenger usage is based on sales of tickets in stated financial years from Office of Rail and Road estimates of station usage. The statistics are for passengers arriving and departing from each station and cover twelve-month periods that start in April. Methodology may vary year on year. Usage since the period 2019–20 have been affected by the COVID-19 pandemic, especially the period 2020–23.

The statistics cover twelve-month periods that start in April.

== Route ==
=== Descending to Coombe ===
The line is single track for the whole of its length and is worked by just a single train set each day. Trains leave Liskeard railway station from a platform at right angles to the main line platforms, initially running northeast away from Looe. Beyond the platform the line takes a long right-hand curve, passing the connection through the goods yard to the main line, and diving underneath the A38 road twice. It then descends steeply, now heading generally southwest, and passes under the Liskeard viaduct carrying the Cornish Main Line 150 feet (46m) above.

Curving right once more, the train joins the main branch line from Looe at Coombe Junction, and comes to a stand on a small level crossing. Most trains change direction here, the train's guard operating the points using the ground frame (see Signalling below), but a few in each direction continue a few yards further to call at Coombe Junction Halt at Lamellion. Beyond the platform the line still continues to Moorswater, passing under the main line again beneath the Moorswater viaduct, but this section is no longer used.

=== Along the valley ===
With the driver and guard having now swapped ends, the train recommences its southerly journey, now running alongside the old Liskeard and Looe Union Canal and East Looe River. Another level crossing is passed at Lodge, and then a short journey brings the train to St Keyne Wishing Well Halt, adjacent to the "Magnificent Music Machines" museum of fairground organs and similar instruments. The holy well of St Keyne is near the village which is a ten-minute walk from the station.

South of St Keyne the canal swaps to the west side of the line for a while, but as the valley closes in it disappears altogether for a distance where the railway was built on top of the redundant canal. One of the old canal's locks can be seen at Causeland railway station. This is the oldest station on the line as it was opened in 1879 when passenger trains first started operating. In common with most of the stations it has been rebuilt in recent years, a smart brick shelter having replaced the original wooden hut.

=== Beside the estuary ===
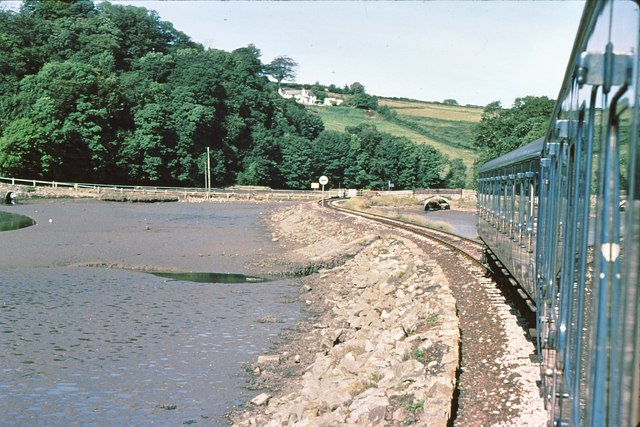
Causeway approach to Terras Crossing

After passing Sandplace railway station the railway follows the east side of the river, which is now a tidal estuary that the line follows to its terminus. The line passes over one more level crossing, the unusual Terras Crossing, where the road approaches the crossing over a causeway that is liable to flooding at high tide, so the footpath is raised on boards alongside. The ruin of the final lock of the canal is on the east of the line here.

After running further alongside the tidal estuary the line finally arrives at Looe railway station, opposite the point at which the West Looe River flows into the East Looe River to form the tidal Looe harbour. The town centre is a five-minute walk further alongside the river and buses to Polperro stop on the road near the station.

All distances along the line are measured from the point near the seven-span road bridge across the river where the Liskeard and Looe Railway connected with the private sidings on Buller Quay. The original station, now the site of the Police Station, was 14 chains (308 yards or 282m) north of this point, but the simple station of 1968 construction is forty yards north of this: thus the mile post marking ¼ mile from the original end of the line is in fact opposite the current platform, just 20 yards from the present southern end of the line.

== Services ==
=== Passenger ===
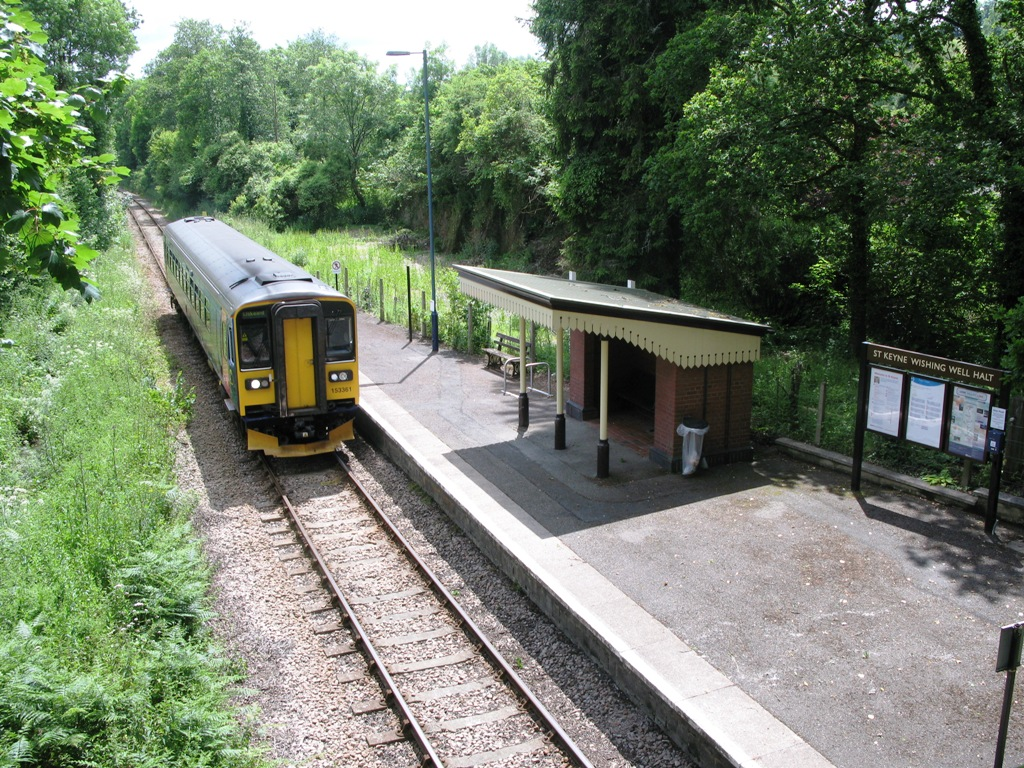
A Class 153 at St Keyne Wishing Well Halt

The service operated by Great Western Railway since 10 December 2006 consisted of nine trains each way daily. During the peak summer period from 20 May to 9 September 2007 three additional services were operated, including a late evening train. In May 2019 Great Western Railway introduced an improved timetable which saw 15 trains a day run on the line Monday to Saturday and 8 on Sundays from April until October.

Coombe Junction Halt railway station is served by only two trains each way Mondays to Saturdays. For most of the day, every second train in each direction runs without any intermediate station calls. On the other, stopping, trains, the other intermediate stations are all request stops – this means that passengers alighting must tell the guard that they wish to do so, and those waiting to join must signal clearly to the driver as the train approaches.

The trains are formed of two-car Class 150s. 150233 was once named Lady Margret of Looe Valley (the original Lady Margret was a steam locomotive belonging to the Liskeard and Looe Railway). Single-car Class 153 153369 was named The Looe Valley Explorer. Both these trains carried large pictures on the outside showing local scenes, but interworked with other similar trains throughout the Great Western Railway network so did not work the line every day. Both these trains have since lost their special liveries and have been repainted in a standard liveries. Class 153s are no longer used on this line as GWR no longer operate them.

=== Freight ===
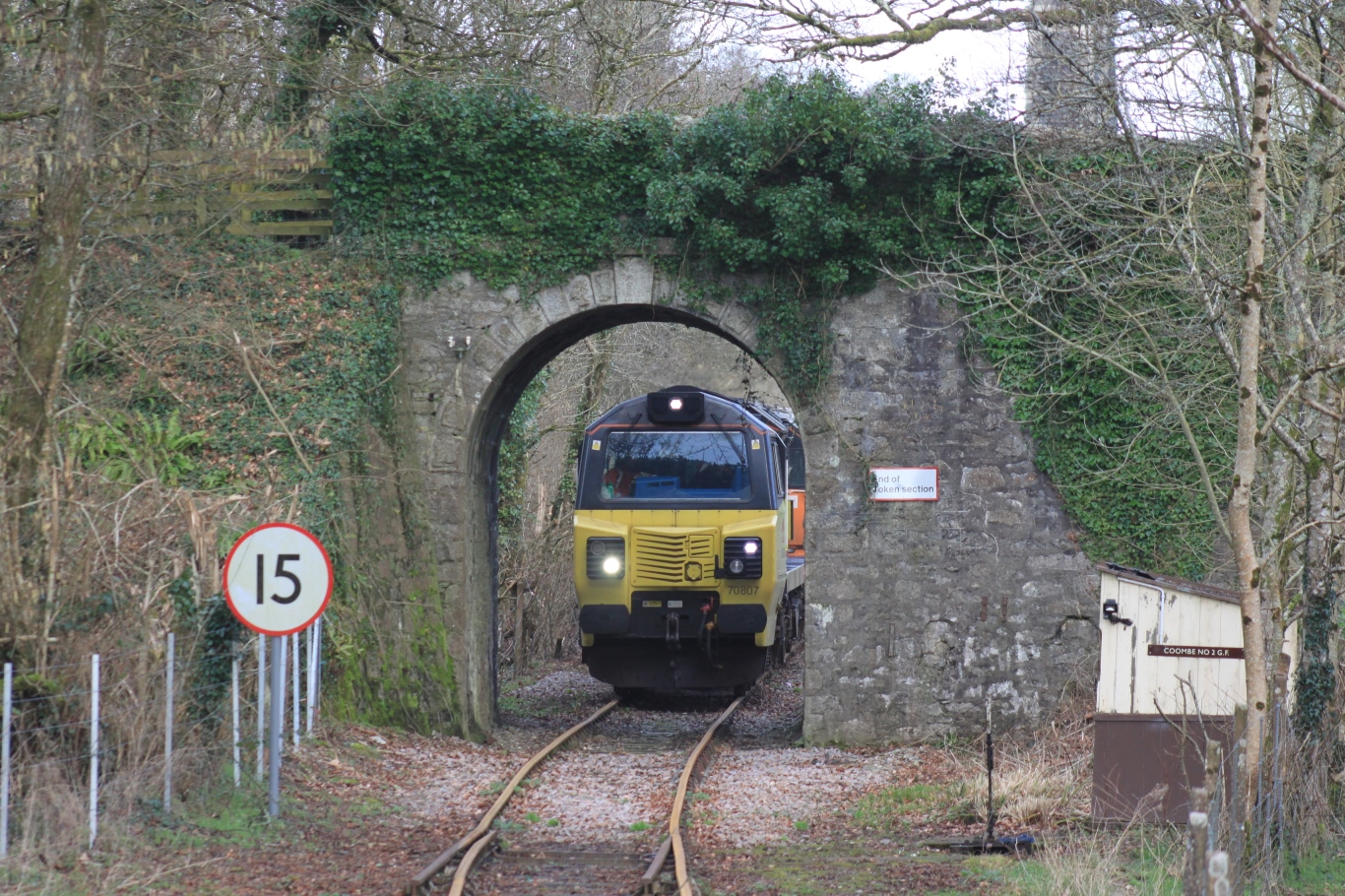
A Class 70 from Moorswater waits at Coombe Number 2 Ground Frame

Freight traffic to Looe was withdrawn from 4 November 1963.

China clay trains continued to serve the English China Clays drier at Moorswater until the works were closed at the end of 1996. The site was later used as a distribution point for cement that was brought in by train. The last cement train ran in 2020 but Moorswater could be used again in the future. Being close to the A38 road makes it a good location for road transfers.

== Signalling ==
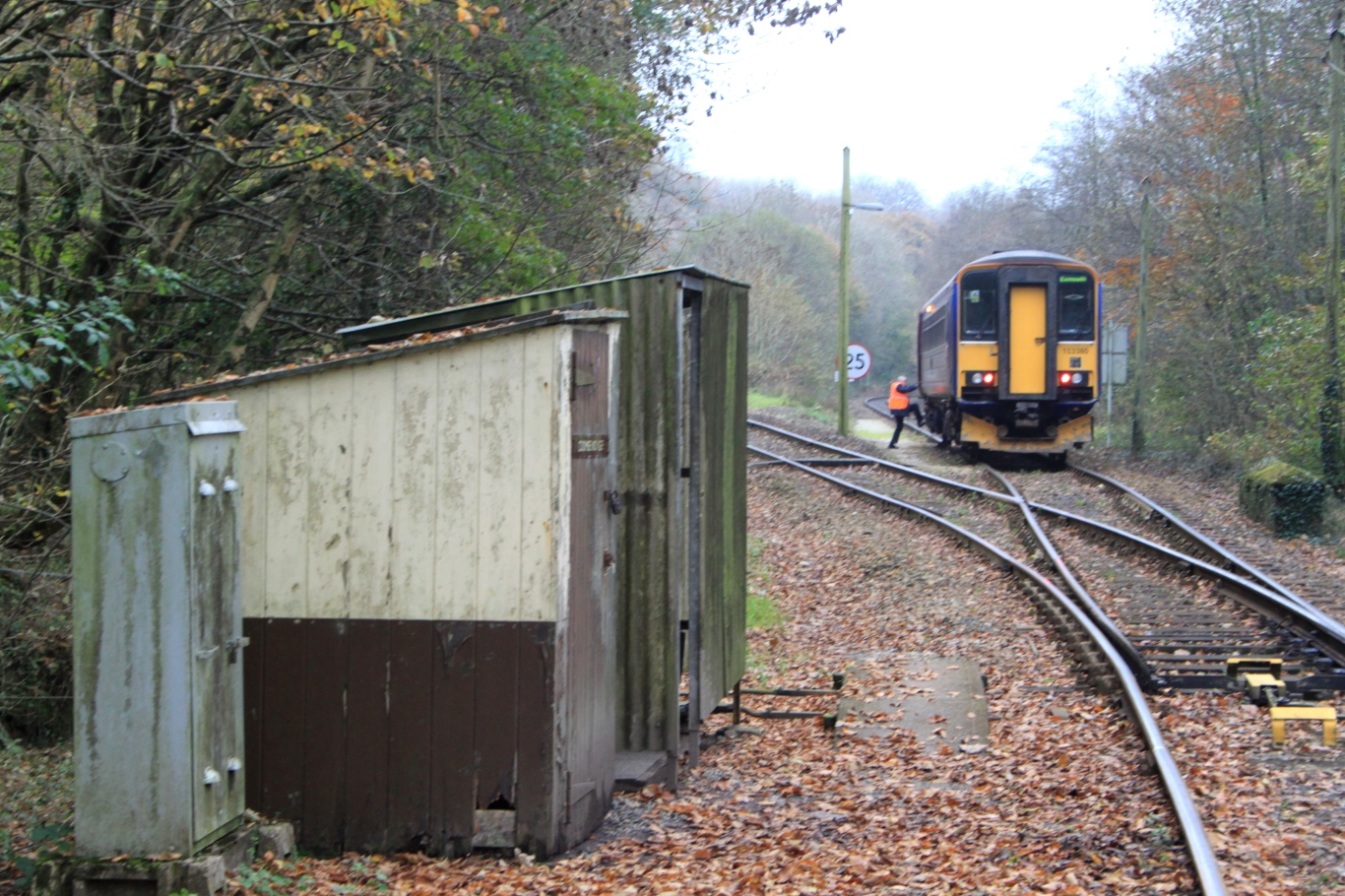
The guard rejoins the train at Coombe Junction after operating the point controls at Coombe Number 1 Ground Frame

Signal boxes were originally provided at Liskeard (at the north end of the branch platform), Coombe Junction and in a small hut at Looe. Liskeard Branch Signal Box was replaced by a ground frame on 15 March 1964 and the signal box at Looe closed on the same date. Coombe Junction Signal Box continued to operate until 8 May 1981. Liskeard Signal Box now supervises the entire line, as well as controls the connection to the mainline.

As of December 2023, the line has three ground frames which are operated by the train crews:

- Liskeard (for the connection between the sidings and the branch line)
- Coombe No. 1 (at the junction between the lines to Liskeard and to Looe)
- Coombe No. 2 (at the Moorswater end of the station to control the track into Moorswater)

The Looe Valley line is divided into three sections, each worked by a different method:

- The section from Liskeard to Coombe: worked by No-Signaller Token. A token machine is located in a hut on Liskeard platform 3 and is used each time a train arrives or departs on the line to Coombe. The token is required to operate any of the three ground frames. Token machines are also located at the ground frames at Coombe.
- The section from Coombe to Looe: worked by One Train Working with train staff. The train staff is kept at Liskeard Signal Box when not in use. It is used to operate Coombe No. 1 Ground Frame so that trains can run between Coombe and Looe.
- The section from Coombe to Moorswater: worked under the authority of a shunter.

The level crossings at Lodge Farm (between Coombe Junction and St Keyne) and at Terras (between Sandplace and Looe) are automatic barrier crossings, locally controlled (ABCL) with warning signals for road users. Trains have to slow on the approach to Lodge Farm and Terras crossings.
