= Lamellion =

Hamlet in Cornwall, England

Coordinates: 50°26′45″N 4°28′16″W

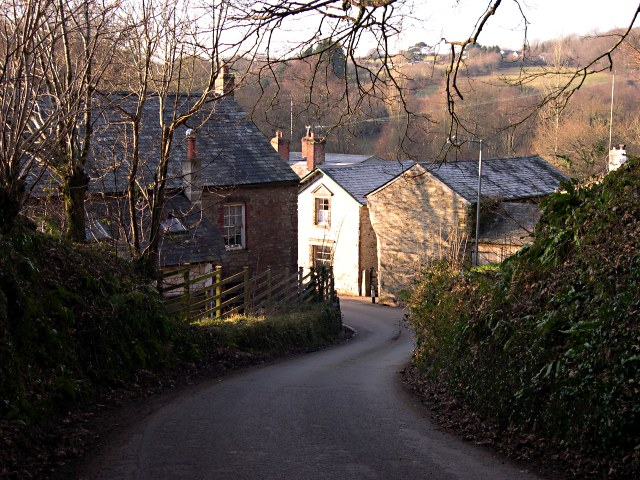
Lower Lamellion

Lamellion is a hamlet in Cornwall, England. It is half a mile southwest of Liskeard (where the population for the 2011 census was included.) and nearer to the town is Lamellion Hospital. The hospital building was the work of John Foulston, 1839, and was built as a workhouse.
