= Moorswater railway station =

Former railway station in England

Moorswater Dowr an Hal
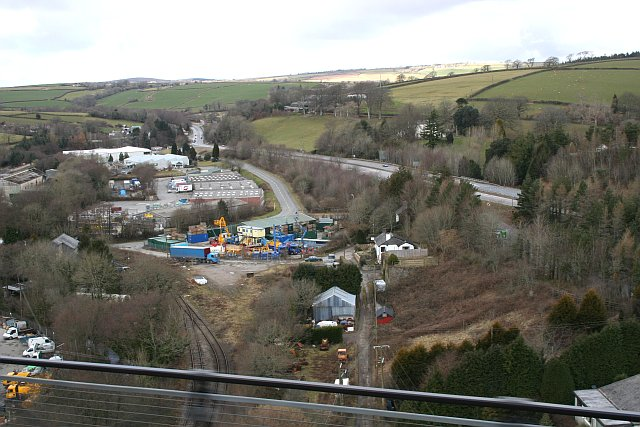

General information
- Location: England
- Coordinates: 50.4494°N 4.484°W

Other information
- Status: Disused

History
- Original company: Liskeard and Caradon Railway

Key dates
- 11 September 1879: opened
- 15 May 1901: closed
Location

Moorswater railway station (Cornish: Dowr an Hal) was the centre of operations for the Liskeard and Caradon Railway and the Liskeard and Looe Railway. The two railways made an end on junction here. It was the site of the lines' engine shed, also a china clay works which is now used as a cement terminal.

== History ==
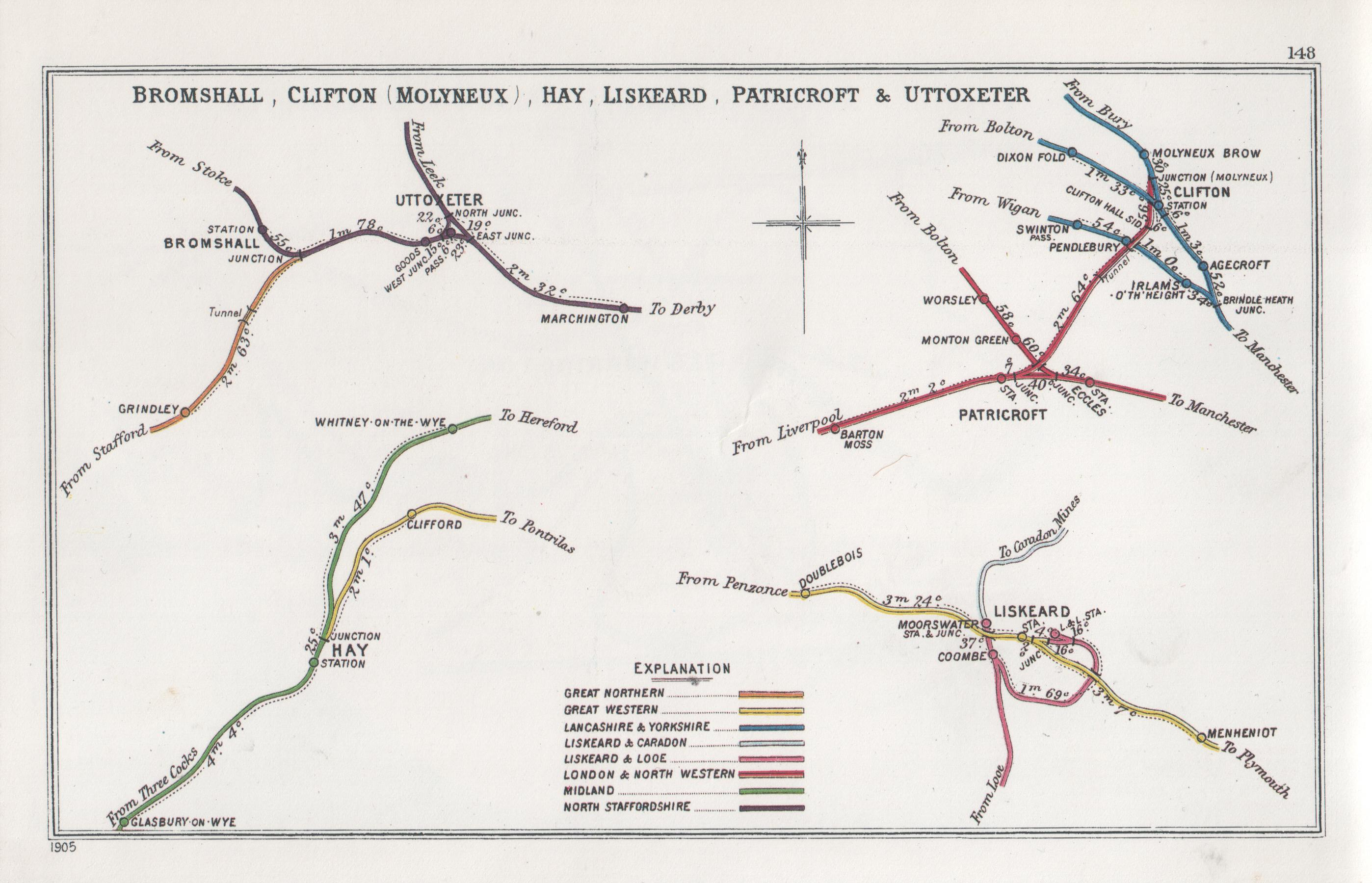
A 1905 Railway Clearing House Junction Diagram showing (lower right) railways in the vicinity of Moorswater

The Liskeard and Caradon Railway was opened on 28 November 1844 from quarries on the moors north of Liskeard to Moorswater where goods were transshipped to the Liskeard and Looe Union Canal. At Looe they could then be transhipped again to sea-going vessels for transport further around the coast.

The canal was superseded by a railway on 27 December 1860 and passengers were carried on the Moorswater to Looe section from 11 September 1879. The Cornwall Railway, which opened in 1859, had intended to make a junction with the Liskeard and Caradon Railway near Moorswater but a lack of capital saw this scheme abandoned, the line passing high above the goods yard on the Moorswater Viaduct. The new station, which was situated just north of the viaduct, was used by passengers travelling into Liskeard, but from 1896 a platform was provided at Coombe where trains would call to set down passengers going to Liskeard railway station if they notified the guard, as the steep road from there to the station was considerably shorter than the route from Moorswater.

On 8 May 1901 passenger trains from Looe were diverted over the new loop line to Liskeard railway station but passenger trains continued to call at Moorswater for another week until Coombe Junction railway station was opened on 15 May 1901 Goods traffic has continued – on and off – up to the present day. A siding for the Cheesewring Quarry Company opposite the station was later used by the Cornwall County Council as a road maintenance depot until 1964. Beyond the station another siding lead into the china clay works of the St Neots China Clay Company where china clay was processed that was brought down from Bodmin Moor by pipeline before being dispatched as powder to Looe or, later, Fowey. This was opened in 1904 and closed in the 1990s.

The site has since been used as a cement distribution depot and trains are brought in from time to time, the motive power being initially provided by Freightliner but more recently by Colas Rail. These ceased in 2020 but the sidings remain in place for any goods traffic that need them. Its location close to the A38 road makes it a strategic location for future freight flows that need to be distributed by road.

== Engine shed ==
The engine shed was situated between the Caradon line and the china clay siding. It was 64 by 32 feet (20 by 10 m) inside with a small workshop beyond. On the west side was another workshop that maintained the wagons and carriages before the line was connected to the Great Western Railway, although passenger trains were normally kept in another shed at Looe.

In Great Western Railway days the shed was home to two locomotives, normally as an outstation from St Blazey engine shed or, for a few years, Laira TMD. 0-6-0STs of 850 and 2021 classes gave way in 1924 to larger 2-6-2Ts of GWR 4400 Class and then 4500 and 4575 classes. The shed closed on 11 September 1961 after which the branch was worked by DMUs and British Rail Class 22 diesel locomotives.

== Accident ==
On 15 June 1906 an accident occurred at Moorswater. Six empty carriages from an excursion had been taken up to Liskeard but a mishap during uncoupling the locomotive saw the carriages pushed back onto the branch where they ran away down the steep gradient. At Coombe a collision was avoided by the signalman at Liskeard warning his colleague at Coombe Junction; a passenger train from Looe was stopped at the junction signals. The carriages were estimated to pass through the station at over 60 mph (100 km/h) and ran through to Moorswater, where they collided with other carriages in the shed. All were damaged beyond repair.

== Cultural impact ==
Moorswater is one of the stations named in Bernard Moore's poem Travelling.
