= Looe railway station =

Railway station in Cornwall, England

Looe
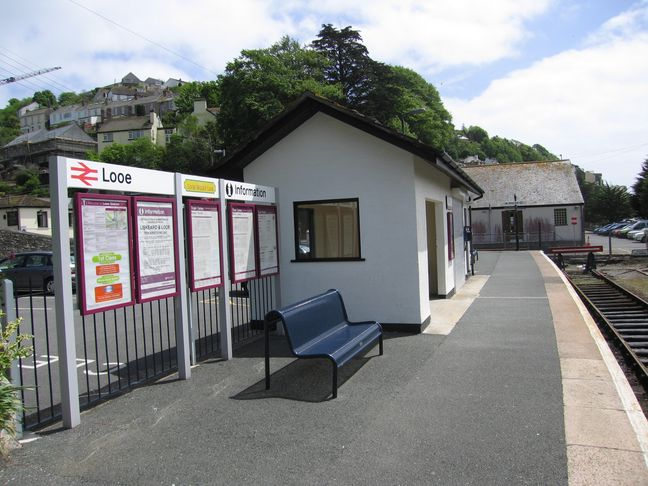

General information
- Location: East and West Looe, Cornwall; England
- Coordinates: 50.3594°N 4.45653°W
- Grid reference: SX253539
- Manager: Great Western Railway
- Platforms: 1

Other information
- Station code: LOO
- Classification: DfT category F1

Key dates
- 1860: Opened for goods
- 1879: open for passengers
- 1963: closed for goods
- 1968: station shortened

Passengers
- 2020/21: ▼37,552
- 2021/22: ▲0.118 million
- 2022/23: ▼0.115 million
- 2023/24: ▼0.111 million
- 2024/25: ▲0.120 million
Location
Notes
- Passenger statistics from the Office of Rail and Road

Looe railway station serves the twin towns of East and West Looe, in Cornwall, England. The station is the terminus of the scenic Looe Valley Line 8 3/4 miles (14 km) south of Liskeard. It faces out across the estuary of the River Looe.

== History ==
The Liskeard and Looe Railway was opened on 27 December 1860 to carry goods traffic; passenger trains started (and Looe station opened) on 11 September 1879. The railway in those days connected with the Liskeard and Caradon Railway at Moorswater, the loop line from Coombe Junction to Liskeard railway station not opening until 25 February 1901 (goods) and 15 May 1901 (passenger). The railway was used for transporting copper ore to South Wales (via ships from Looe Harbour), then primarily became a passenger service as goods traffic declined, becoming a tourist destination in its own right.

The station was unusual for a terminus, in that there was just a single platform and track, with no loop for the locomotive to run round to the back of the train for the return journey. Instead, all trains continued empty to the carriage shed and engine shed that was situated between the platform and the road bridge across the river. Goods sidings were provided between these sheds and the river, but much of the goods traffic was destined for Buller Quay beyond the approach to the bridge.

Looe signal box was situated in a hut on the platform. It only had eight levers and was closed on 15 March 1964, after which the section to Coombe Junction was controlled by issuing the train driver with a distinct wooden staff.

The Looe branch, like most Cornish branch-lines, was proposed for closure in the 1963 Beeching Report. The sidings beyond the station were taken out of use in November 1963 and the line cut back by 110 yards (100 m) on 28 April 1968; the police station now stands where the railway station building and most of the platform once was (the current platform is the top end of the original one). The zero milepost was situated near the seven-span road bridge across the river where the railway connected with the private sidings on Buller Quay. The original station was 14 chains (280 m) north of this point, but the line has since been further shortened, so the mile post marking 1/4 mile (400 m) from the 'end' of the line is in fact opposite the platform and just 20 yards (18 m) from the present stop block.

== Facilities ==
There is a single platform, on the left of trains arriving from Liskeard. There is a small waiting area and benches, as well as an information point on the platform. There are no ticket purchase facilities, so passengers buy tickets in advance or from the guard on the train.

== Services ==
All trains run to Liskeard along the Looe Valley Line. As of 2026 there are 13 services on weekdays and 8 on Sundays. 3 of the weekday services run directly to Liskeard without calling at any of the intermediate stations.

Preceding station	National Rail	Following station
Sandplace towards Liskeard	Great Western Railway Looe Valley Line	Terminus

== Community rail ==
The railway between Liskeard and Looe is designated as a community rail line and is supported by marketing provided by the Devon and Cornwall Rail Partnership. The line is promoted under the "Looe Valley Line" name. The "Globe Inn" opposite the station is included in the Looe Valley Line rail ale trail, along with seven other pubs in East and West Looe.

Under its Looe Valley Railway Company trading arm, the Devon and Cornwall Rail Partnership has run a Summer ticket office at Looe station since 2004.

The Partnership ran a project celebrating the history and heritage of the Looe Valley Line in 2019.

== See also ==
- Looe high-level railway station, terminus of the St Germans & Looe Railway proposed in 1935 but not built

== Bibliography ==
- Beeching, Richard (27 March 1963). The Reshaping of British Railways, part 1: Report (Report). London: Her Majesty's Stationery Office.
- Beale, Gerry (2000). The Liskeard and Looe Branch. Didcot: Wild Swan Publications Ltd. ISBN 1-874103-47-X.
- Bennett, Alan (1990). The Great Western Railway in East Cornwall. Cheltenham: Runpast Publishing. ISBN 1-870754-11-5.
- Clinker, CR (1963). The Railways of Cornwall 1809 - 1963. Dawlish: David and Charles.
- Cooke, RA (1977). Track Layout Diagrams of the GWR and BR WR, Section 11: East Cornwall. Harwell: RA Cooke.
- MacDermot, E T (1931). History of the Great Western Railway, volume II 1863-1921. London: Great Western Railway.
- Marshall, Geoff; Pipe, Vicki (2018). The Railway Adventures: Places, Trains, People and Stations. September Publishing. ISBN 978-1910463871.
- Messenger, Michael (2001). Caradon & Looe : the canal, railways and mines. Truro: Twelveheads Press. ISBN 0-906294-46-0.
- Tolson, JM; Roose, G; Whetmath, CFD (1974). Railways of Looe and Caradon. Bracknell: Forge Books.

This station offers access to the South West Coast Path
Distance to path	¼ mile
Next station anticlockwise	Plymouth 21 miles
Next station clockwise	Par 18 miles
