= Liskeard railway station =

Railway station in Cornwall, England

Liskeard Lyskerrys

General information
- Location: Liskeard, Cornwall; England
- Coordinates: 50.447°N 4.469°W
- Grid reference: SX247636
- Manager: Great Western Railway
- Platforms: 3

Other information
- Station code: LSK
- Classification: DfT category D

History
- Original company: Cornwall Railway
- Pre-grouping: Great Western Railway
- Post-grouping: Great Western Railway

Key dates
- 1859: Opened
- 1901: Looe branch opened

Passengers
- 2021/22: ▲0.295 million
- Interchange: ▲56,052
- 2022/23: ▲0.310 million
- Interchange: ▲59,301
- 2023/24: ▲0.323 million
- Interchange: ▼58,653
- 2024/25: ▲0.354 million
- Interchange: ▲63,806
- 2025/26: ▲0.370 million
- Interchange: ▲69,840
Location
Notes
- Passenger statistics from the Office of Rail and Road

Liskeard railway station (Cornish: Lyskerrys) serves the town of Liskeard in Cornwall, England. The station is approximately 18 miles (29 km) west of Plymouth on the Cornish Main Line and 264 miles 71 chains (426.3 km) from London Paddington via Box and Plymouth Millbay. It is the junction for the Looe Valley Line. The railway station is situated approximately 1/2 mile (0.80 km) south-west of Liskeard town centre.

== History ==
=== Cornwall Railway ===
The station opened with the Cornwall Railway on 4 May 1859. It was described at the time as occupying "an elevated position nearly a mile to the south of the town", the main building "stands considerably above the rails, the descent to which is by a long flight of steps, which will be hereafter, we understand, entirely covered in. The building is of stone, having a large verandah projecting over the road. On the opposite side of the line is the arrival station, which is also a stone erection; and to the south of this, is the goods shed, which is a timber structure, having warehouses and offices at the ends".

Traffic at the new station was sufficient to warrant additional goods sidings before the end of the year. There is no evidence that the steps from the booking office were ever covered, instead they were replaced with a slope in 1866.

=== Looe branch ===
A railway had run to Looe from Moorswater, in the valley west of Liskeard, since 27 December 1860. On 25 February 1901 the Liskeard and Looe Railway was extended up to the Great Western Railway station, this extension line opening to passengers on 15 May 1901.

The Liskeard and Looe Railway arrived at right angles to the main line at a dedicated platform with its own buildings; Liskeard therefore has, in essence, two stations. Trains start their journey by travelling northwards, away from Looe. They swing round towards the south, descend gradients as steep as 1 in 40 to pass below the Liskeard Viaduct, swing back towards the north, and then reverse at Coombe Junction for the remainder of their journey to Looe. In the days of steam locomotives, there was an extended stop at Coombe to enable the locomotive to run around to the front of the train when reversing direction. If someone just missed a train leaving Liskeard for Looe, it was possible to run down the hill to Coombe and pick up the train from there.

A connection in the goods yard allowed goods trains and empty carriages to be exchanged between the main line and the branch. A separate Liskeard Branch signal box was opened with the loop line to control trains going to Coombe Junction. It was closed on 15 March 1964, since when the connection to the main line is operated from a ground frame.

=== Later history ===
The Cornwall Railway was amalgamated into the Great Western Railway on 1 July 1889 and the Liskeard and Looe Railway did the same on 1 January 1923. The Great Western Railway was nationalised into British Railways from 1 January 1948 which was then privatised in the 1990s.

The station was modernised in 2004-2005, with much of the redevelopment being funded by the European Regional Development Fund. A brick extension to the original Brunel-designed building was replaced by a light and airy glass structure and improvements were made to the ticket office, toilets and cafe. This work was entered into annual National Railway Heritage Awards in 2005 and won the Network Rail Partnership Award.

=== Accidents and incidents ===
Two accidents have occurred at Liskeard due to its elevated position. No one was hurt in either incident.

In April 1863 a goods train was incorrectly sent into a siding where it collided with some wagons standing there. The impact sent these through the buffer stop and over the edge of the embankment.

On 15 June 1906, five empty carriages ran away from the branch platform during shunting operations. They ran down the gradient to Coombe Junction and along the line to Moorswater where they ran into the shed, knocking down the shed wall.

== Description ==
View looking towards Plymouth from the road bridge. Beyond the footbridge, the connection to the Looe Branch is on the left and the main line continues straight ahead across Liskeard Viaduct.

The main line platforms flank the double-track line in a deep cutting, which is crossed at high level by a road bridge and at lower level by the station footbridge. At each end of the platforms, the line dips down towards flanking viaducts, the Liskeard viaduct to the east and the Moorswater viaduct to the west. The Isambard Kingdom Brunel-designed booking office is at high level next to the road. A curved glazed canopy overlooking the line was added in 2004 by Robert Allen Architects.

The station has three platforms:

- Platform 1 for down trains towards Par, Truro and Penzance
- Platform 2 for up trains towards Plymouth, Exeter, London Paddington and the north
- Platform 3 for branch line trains to Looe

There is step-free access to all platforms. Platform 2 is on the side of various access points to the station which can be used, with the main one being through the station building which houses a ticket office, toilet facilities and a cafe. Trains to Looe leave from a separate terminal platform at a right angle to the main platforms at the eastern end of platform 2. The Looe platform is separated from the rest of the station by an access road between them, with there being a sharply-curved spur line that junctions off the up line going around the back of the car park to reach the branch line itself. and has its own range of station buildings which were built around 1901 to the designs of John Sansom.

== Passenger volume ==
The number of passengers starting or finishing their journey at Liskeard has been consistently greater than 250,000 since 2006, and 350,000 since 2014. During the COVID-19 pandemic in 2020 it dropped to just under 110,000 but exceeded 350,000 again in 2024. Additionally, upwards of 60,000 passengers change trains here each year.

Passengers by year
Year (Note: The passenger data covers twelve month periods that start in April.)	Entries and exits	Interchanges
2004–2005	232,269	32,745
2005–2006	237,113	31,479
2006–2007	267,864	38,868
2007–2008	274,090	36,943
2008–2009	294,638	38,783
2009–2010	289,276	42,754
2010–2011	309,162	49,660
2011–2012	344,574	67,789
2012–2013	335,812	63,506
2013–2014	344,144	68,389
2014–2015	357,086	67,888
2015–2016	351,394	63,559
2016–2017	358,324	66,424
2017–2018	355,356	65,621
2018–2019	351,172	61,982
2019–2020	358,818	60,949
2020–2021	109,704	17,144
2021–2022	294,590	56,052
2022–2023	310,158	59,301
2023–2024	322,996	58,653
2024–2025	353,556	63,806

== Signalling ==
Liskeard signal box

Having been opened in 1915 by the Great Western Railway, the signal box at Liskeard is located at the Plymouth end of the westbound platform, where it overlooks Liskeard Viaduct and the spur line used to access the Looe branch line. The station retains mechanical semaphore signalling with use of the absolute block signalling system. There are crossovers at each end of the station allowing trains to reverse at Liskeard if required operationally, this is with use of ground signals. Signals controlled by Liskeard signal box carry the identification code 'LD'. In 2024, a new train describer screen was installed in the signal box at Liskeard. Historically train descriptors were only in use as far as Liskeard, but it was extended as far as Roskear signal box following the 2024 re-signalling works in Cornwall, which sees signalling control between Liskeard and Roskear now operated by the Mid-Cornwall Workstation at Exeter Panel Signal Box.

== Services ==
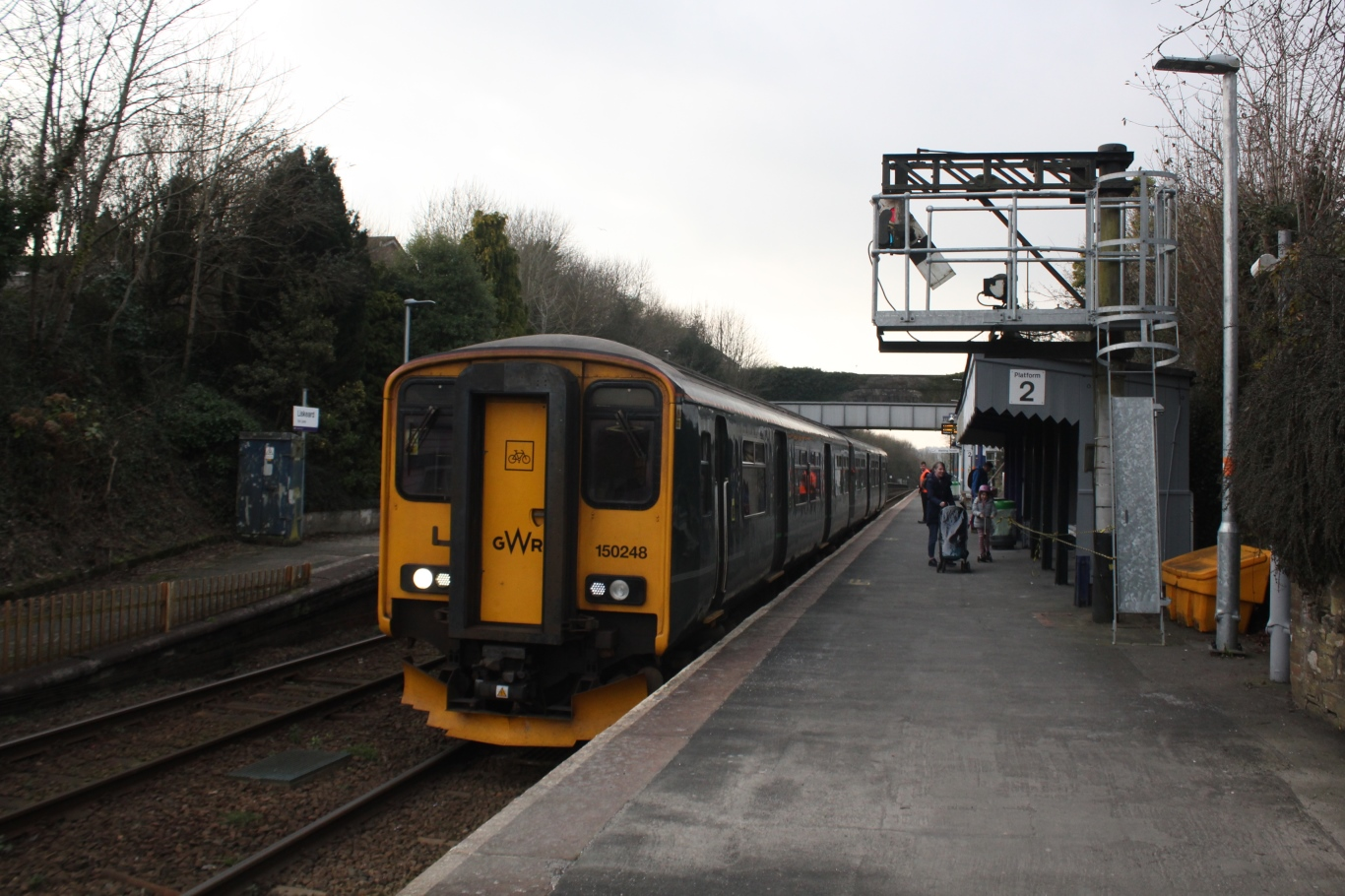
A Class 150 at Liskeard going towards Plymouth. The underslung 'gallows' signal allows drivers to see it clearly behind the waiting shelter

Platform 3 for trains to Looe at Liskeard

Liskeard is served by two train operating companies, which provide the following general off-peak service pattern in trains per hour/day (tph/tpd):

Great Western Railway

- 2 tph to Penzance
- 2 tph to Plymouth; of which:
  - 1 tp2h continues to Exeter St Davids
  - 1 tp2h continues to London Paddington, via Exeter St Davids, Taunton and Reading
- 1 tph to Looe, via the Looe Valley Line (services do not run on winter Sundays)

The Night Riviera sleeper:

- 1 tpd to Penzance
- 1 tpd to London Paddington.

CrossCountry:

- 2 tpd to Penzance (3 tpd on a Sunday)
- 1 tpd to Edinburgh Waverley, via Bristol Temple Meads, Birmingham New Street, Leeds and York
- 1 tpd to Birmingham New Street (to Bristol Temple Meads on a Saturday and Plymouth on a Sunday)

Preceding station	National Rail	Following station
Plymouth or Menheniot	Great Western Railway; Cornish Main Line	Bodmin Parkway
Plymouth	CrossCountry	Bodmin Parkway
Terminus	Great Western Railway Looe Valley Line	Coombe Junction Halt towards Looe
Historical railways
Menheniot	BR Western Region; Cornish Main Line	Doublebois; Line open, station closed

== Community rail ==
The railway between Liskeard and Looe is designated as a community rail line. It is supported by marketing provided by the Devon and Cornwall Rail Partnership and promoted under the "Looe Valley Line" name. The signs on the Looe Valley platform were replaced in 2007 with brown and cream signs in the style used by the Western Region of British Railways in the 1950s and 1960s.

The "Old Stag Inn" (now closed) opposite the station is included in the Looe Valley Line rail ale trail, as is the "White Horse" in the town centre.
