= Looe Estuary =

Estuary in Cornwall, England

Coordinates: 50.35548°N 4.45442°W

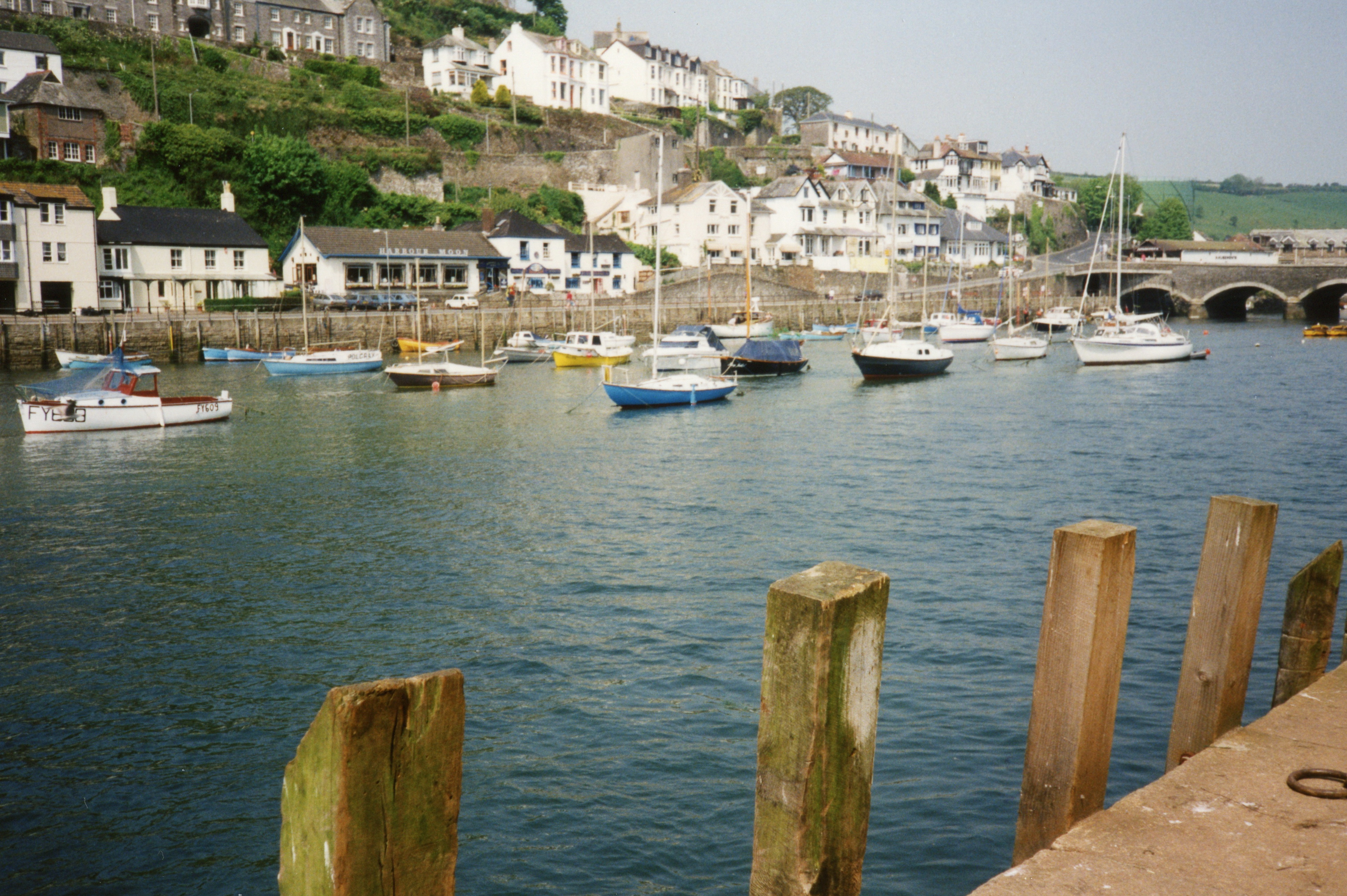
Looe Estuary, Cornwall, England

The Looe Estuary (grid reference SX255535) is an estuary in the southeastern part of Cornwall in south-west England, which leads to the mouth of the River Looe in Looe Bay. The town of Looe sits on the west and east side of the estuary.

The estuary is a ria and was formed around 12,000 years ago.

From 1405 to 1411, a bridge was built over the estuary and in 1824, a coastguard station was built, possibly to suppress smuggling operations in the area.
