= University of Plymouth Students' Union =

Coordinates: 50.374121°N 4.138512°W

University of Plymouth Students' Union (UPSU)
- Motto: Transforming lives through experience
- Institution: University of Plymouth and partner colleges.
- Location: University of Plymouth, Plymouth Campus, Drake Circus
- Established: 1992
- President: Dindu Okechukwu
- Chief Executive: Sarah Davey
- Vice presidents: Darcie Jones, Joshua Frost, Krupa Naik
- Members: 18,500+ at UoP, 10,000+ at Partner Colleges (Estimated as of October 2019)
- Website: UPSU homepage

The University of Plymouth Students' Union (UPSU) is based on the University of Plymouth campus, in the Drake Circus area of Plymouth, Devon, England.

With about 30,000 student members it is one of the largest student unions in the UK, and hosts a wide array of events and offers services to all students.

== History ==
UPSU was founded in 1992. In Summer 2014, the union's main building containing the nightclub and lounge was refurbished.

In 2016, the union set up an accommodation service which it sold to Clever Student Lets in 2018, before the sale the union's accommodation arm managed over 300 flats and houses.

=== 2018 NUS Referendum ===
On the 15 November 2018 UPSU's Board of Trustees sent a notice to hold a referendum regarding the union's affiliation with the National Union of Students (NUS). UPSU said that students were concerned with "value for money" and "lack of political standing and lack of support" from the NUS.

The voting was held online and was open from 26 to 30 November 2018. The results of the referendum was that UPSU should not remain affiliated NUS.

Voting option	Total	Of total (%)
Remain affiliated with the NUS (YES)	477	47.42
Leave the NUS (NO)	519	51.59
Abstention	10	0.99
Total	1006	100

== Officers and representatives ==
=== Sabbatical officers ===
The UPSU sabbatical officers are elected in March and decide the day-to-day running of the union. The sabbatical team consists of four full-time officers who are current students or have recently graduated as students from the university. Each has their own remit and they also provide academic and national representation for Plymouth students.

Role	Student
President	Tonari Arikekpar
VP activities	Isla Symons
VP education	Darcie Jones
VP wellbeing & diversity	Daniella Marley

=== School representatives ===
School representatives are elected students who share feedback and opinions of students from the course reps to the university's schools. They regularly meet with their faculty lead and the VP Education.

=== Course representatives ===
Course representatives represent students' specific views on academic matters in their course, they're elected by the students who study that course and pass on any feedback and opinions to the school representatives.

=== Previous roles ===
Before 2024, part-time officers represented particular groups of students and run forums related to their role. Forums were replaced with networks, and part-time officers were replaced by network chairs.

== Committees and forms ==
=== Union Council ===
The Union Council (Formerly the executive committee and Student Parliament), is made up of 17 part-time officers, 4 elected Sabbatical Officers, and 12 school representatives. The Chair of the Accountability Board also attends these meetings, to observe and ensure that they are taking place in a fair and democratic manner. The Union Council is in place to make important decisions that effect the student body and ensure that the wide diversity of the student body is fairly represented in these decisions.

=== Accountability Board ===
The Accountability Board is an elected board of students whose role is to scrutinise officers and forms to ensure they are being as fair as they can be, and to hold them to account when they are not.

=== Student Forums ===
As well as sitting on each of the 15 elected forum chairs also runs their own forum. All of the forums are open for anyone to go along to and take part in discussions, however there are four forums that you would need to identify as a member of that group to vote in forum decisions. The accountability forum however is only open to elected members, its job is to hold all members of UEC to account.

Student Forums include Environment & Sustainability, Faith & Belief, Global Students, Mature Students, Postgraduate, Societies, Sports, Welfare, Partner Institutions, LGBT, Women's, Volunteering, and Accountability.

== Facilities ==
=== Main Building ===
The main union building is mostly underground.

==== SU Nightclub ====
The top bar is known as burst bar serving smoothies, juices and teas adjacent to this is the 'Zig-Zag' bar.

Below the lounge is the little room, which has a dance floor, small bar, and pool tables, and is sometimes used for private events. Further into the building is the main bar, where most of the union's events take place: it has a dance floor with DJ booth and projectors.

In 2010 the union's bar won first place in the National Union of Students' Best Bar None competition, which assesses how bars manage student safety.

In 2020, the SU started a deal with Need-a-cab where students could take a taxi home and pay for it the following day at The Hive if they show the taxi driver their university ID card.

==== The Hive ====
The Hive is the main hub for democratic activities happening at the SU. It is attached to the main building on the first floor. It offers to UPSU members a range of free and confidential advice, including financial and academic advice. The SU used to have an online accommodation letting service in The Hive, which it has since discontinued

=== Shop ===
The union also operates a small store called SU:Shop which is located opposite the library. The shop sells basic groceries, snacks, lunch meal deals, and University of Plymouth branded merchandise.

== Societies and sports clubs ==
The union supports societies and sports clubs, which are by an elected committee from the clubs' membership. Any student can set up a society. Sports teams are supported by the union and the university and represent the university. There is currently 165 societies and sports clubs at the union.

In 2018, the Conservative Society received backlash for hosting an event where member's shirts had antisemitic messages and symbols. UPSU responded, saying "We totally condemn behaviour of this kind along with all forms of racism and anti-Semitism", and the society was subsequently suspended by UPSU.

=== Plymouth Night Patrol ===
Plymouth Night Patrol (PNP) society at the union who aim to keep students safe on nights out around the city by supporting students and the emergency services. They operate a control room inside the UPSU on Wednesday, Friday, and Saturday nights.

== Volunteering and fundraising ==
The Volunteering and fundraising departments are situated in "The Hive", at the south of the building. Volunteering opportunities range from helping with a Buddy scheme, assisting with upkeep of the Monkey Sanctuary in Looe, Cornwall to helping run projects in a local Plymouth school, and more.

Rag week in February each year aims to raise both awareness of and money for charity. Events have included include a pizza eating contest, endurance, bake sales, mile of pennies, city and campus raids, pyjama day, treasure hunts, pool contests and karaoke.

== Events ==
The union holds weekly and monthly events, and special events throughout the year.

The first event of the year is 'Freshers Week' at the start of every yeah which is open to all students. The event hosts a number of Fairs in various locations around campus including 'Freshers Fair', where companies give our freebies to students; the 'Sports Fair' and 'Society Fair', where student groups advertise themselves; and the 'Volunteering & Feel Good Fair', where students are told about support available to them and how they can participate in volunteering.

=== Summer Ball ===
The UPSU Summer Ball is held annually at the end of the academic year (June). As well as having a number of stages and guest acts, the event usually has food stalls, a fair ground; casino (non-monetary); inflatables and various other entertainment.

== Membership ==
All 18,500+ (figure as of October 2019) University of Plymouth Students are automatically members of UPSU.

Over 10,000 students do not study at the main University of Plymouth campus but at partner colleges. All Higher Education students on University of Plymouth courses at these colleges are automatically members of the UPSU and representatives are available at the larger colleges which, as of 2011, are Bridgwater and Taunton College, The British College of Osteopathic Medicine, City of Bristol College, City College Plymouth, Cornwall College, Dartington Trust, Exeter College, Hydrographic and Meteorological Training Unit - HMS Drake, GSM London, Highlands College, Jersey, Institute for Export and International Trade, MLA College, PETROC, RILA Institute of Health Sciences, Royal Marines School of Music, South Devon College, Strode College, Truro and Penwith College, Weymouth College, and Yeovil College University Centre.
