= Looe Bridge =

Road bridge over the River Looe in Cornwall, England

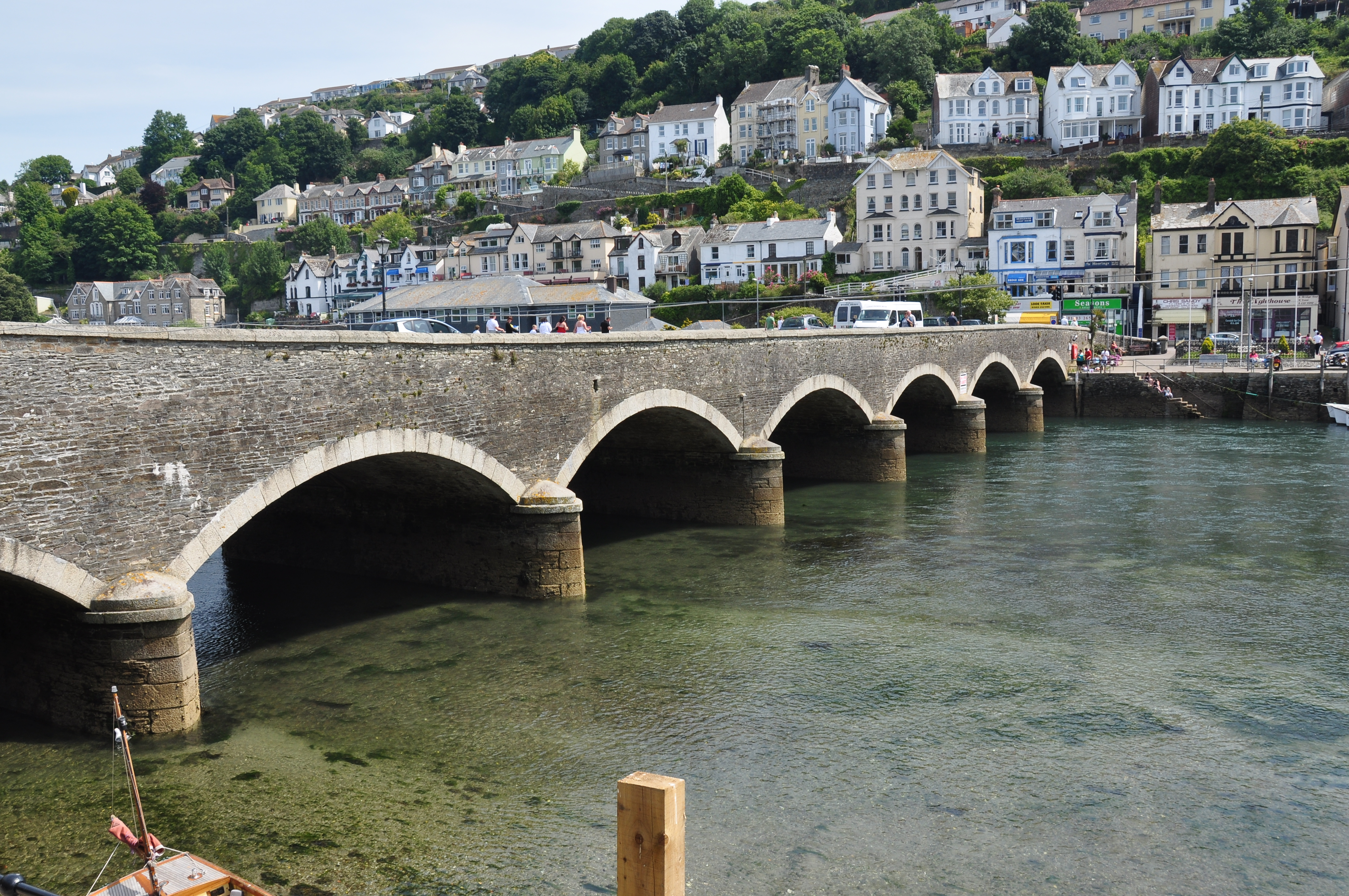
- The downstream face of Looe Bridge (pictured in 2011)
- Coordinates: 50.3562°N 4.4559°W
- OS grid reference: SX 25395 53584
- Carries: A387 road
- Crosses: River Looe
- Locale: Looe, Cornwall
- Heritage status: Grade II listed
- Preceded by: Terras Bridge

Characteristics
- Design: Arch bridge
- Material: Slatestone, granite
- No. of spans: 9
- Piers in water: 6

History
- Architect: William Pease
- Construction start: 1854
- Construction end: 1855
- Construction cost: £2,984 (equivalent to £353,777 in 2023)
- Opened: 4 September 1855

Statistics

Listed Building – Grade II
- Official name: Bridge over East Looe River and lamp standards
- Designated: 8 November 1993
- Reference no.: 1201093

Looe Bridge is a bridge in Looe, Cornwall, across the River Looe. Built in the 1850s to replace a dangerous 15th-century structure, the bridge carries the A387 road and is a Grade II listed building.

== History ==
=== Early crossing (c. 1400–1405) ===
An early wooden bridge was built across the river at Looe in c. 1400. This structure burned down in 1405.

=== Medieval bridge (1411–1853) ===
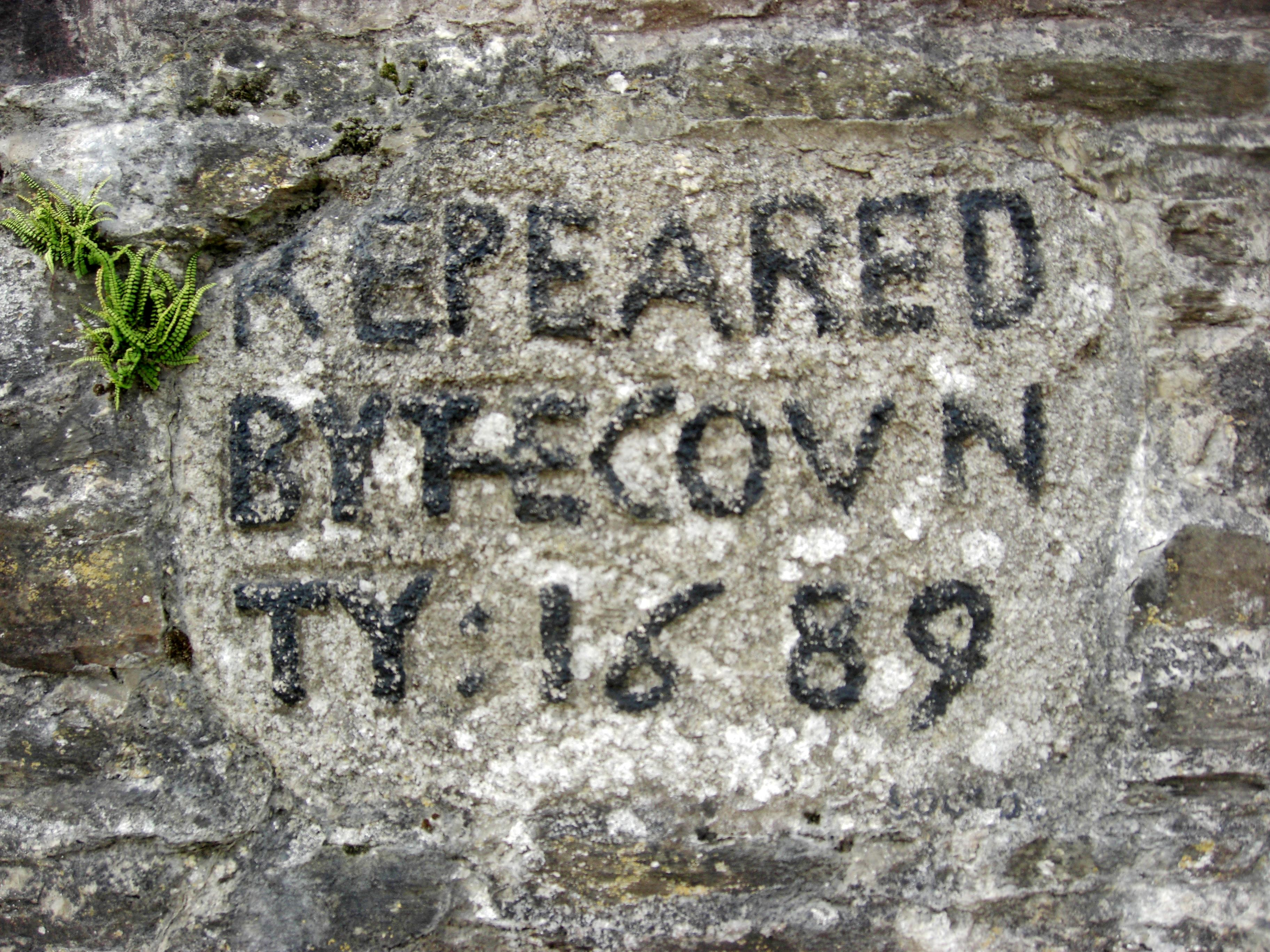
A plaque in West Looe commemorating the 1689 repairs to the old bridge

The first stone bridge across the river in the town was built following a grant of 22 October 1411; construction took 25 years and was completed in 1436. (Note: One source states that construction completed in 1411, having begun in 1405) Most descriptions of the bridge give its length as 384 ft (117 m), although publication of 1847 described it as being 423 ft (129 m) long. Similarly disputed is the number of arches the bridge had – reports by John Leland describe either 12 or 16, The Gentleman's Magazine listed 13, Celia Fiennes referred to its 14 arches, William Borlase sketched and the National Heritage List for England states 15, and Thomas Bond specified 18. The arches varied in width from 9–22 ft (2.7–6.7 m); the larger spans allowed passage of timber rafts. The width of the bridge was 6 ft 8 in (2.03 m) at its narrowest and 10 ft 3 in (3.12 m) at its widest. On the centre of the bridge was a chapel dedicated to Saint Anne; the first mention of the chapel is from 18 November 1436 when the chaplain obtained a license from Edmund Lacey to hold a wedding there. It is possible that the chapel was demolished at the time of the Reformation, although some traces were reported to have still existed when the bridge was demolished. In 1689 the bridge was "in general decay", and the repairs were seen to by the county authority. Granite plaques were installed at each end of the bridge, of which the west plaque still exists.

In 1478, William of Worcester referred to the bridge as Low Brygge, and described it as maximus pons – i.e. the largest bridge in Cornwall. In 1508, wealthy Cornwall merchant Thomas Yogge bequeathed a hundredweight (112 lb or 51 kg) of salt for repairs to the bridge, provided that the town of Loo [sic] brought it from Plymouth at the town's own expense. A notice placed in The London Gazette in 1847 stated of an intent to apply to parliament to improve and maintain Looe Harbour, and to "take down the bridge across the said harbour, and to build a new bridge instead thereof, with proper approaches and works connected therewith, at or near the site of the present bridge". The following year, the East and West Looe Harbour and Bridge Act was passed, which stated that "the present bridge across the harbour is dilapidated and ill built". A similar description of the old structure said that it was a "narrow time-eaten bridge [that] had become ruinous and dangerous". Conversely, a more contemporary report described it as "a very fine mediaeval bridge". Henderson and Coates suggested that had the narrowest part of the bridge been 9 ft (2.7 m) like that at Wadebridge, it would have been spared – and that it was "a thousand pities" the builders had not done so.

=== Victorian bridge (1854–present) ===
A grant for constructing a new bridge was made in 1852. Built approximately 100 yd (91 m) upstream of the site of the older bridge, which had been removed in 1853, the foundation stone was laid on 16 June 1854 and the new bridge opened on 4 September 1855. Designed by William Pease of slatestone with granite dressings, the bridge cost £2,984 (equivalent to £353,777 in 2023) to construct. It has nine "misshapen" arches, of which seven span the river, one is a dry arch on the East Looe side, and one at the West Looe side forms a pedestrian passage. The roadway had an original uniform width of 18 ft 2 in (5.54 m), but underwent a programme of widening in the late 1950s and early 1960s.

The road carried by the bridge forms part of the A387 between Polbathic and Polperro. In 1993, the bridge and its six cast iron lamp standards were given Grade II listed status.
