= UPSU =

UPSU may refer to:

- University of Plymouth Students' Union
- University of Portsmouth Students' Union
