= Terras Bridge =

Road bridge over the River Looe in Cornwall, England

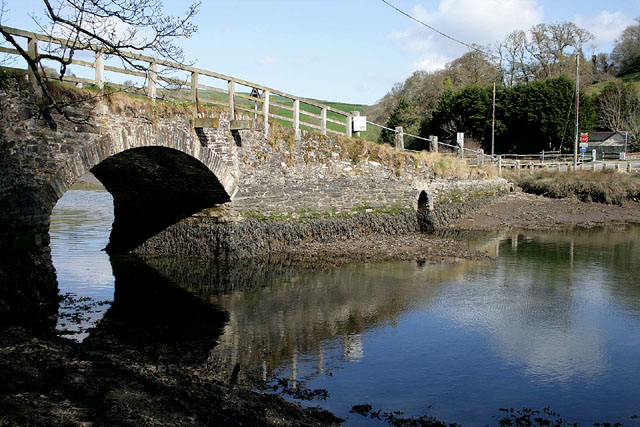
- The downstream face of Terras Bridge
- Coordinates: 50.3739°N 4.4643°W
- OS grid reference: SX 24866 55572
- Carries: Unclassified road
- Crosses: East Looe River
- Locale: Terras Pill, Morval, Cornwall
- Other name(s): Terras Pill Bridge

Characteristics
- Material: Stone
- No. of spans: 2

History
- Construction end: c. 1825

Statistics

Listed Building – Grade II
- Official name: Terras Pill Bridge
- Designated: 18 December 1985
- Reference no.: 1329293

Terras Bridge, also known as Terras Pill Bridge, is a road bridge near Morval in Cornwall, England. Built in c. 1825, the Grade II listed bridge crosses the tidal East Looe River, and is adjacent to the Liskeard and Looe Railway and the remains of the Liskeard and Looe Union Canal.

== Description ==
Built in c. 1825, the stone bridge carries an unclassified road over the East Looe River at Terras Pill, (Note: "Pill" is derived from pil, which refers to a tidal creek) between the parishes of Morval and Duloe. As well as the main span across the river channel, the bridge has a second small flood arch. The main bridge arch was navigable, maintaining the river's navigability to Sandplace. Downstream of the bridge, the only crossing of the river is Looe Bridge.

At the north side of the bridge, the road continues on a causeway over mudflats and saltings. The East Looe River is tidal as far as Tregarland Bridge – a little over 1 mi (1.6 km) upstream of Terras Bridge – and so flooding of the causeway is not uncommon. At the north end of the causeway crosses the Liskeard and Looe Union Canal by another stone arch. The canal was approved by Parliament the same year the bridge opened, and began operation in 1827. A short distance upstream of the bridge was the canal's first lock which acted as a tidal barrier.

In 1985, Terras Bridge was made a Grade II listed structure.

=== Level crossing ===
In 1853 the Liskeard and Looe Railway was built on the bank separating the river and canal. The railway line crosses the bridge's roadway at an open level crossing. The railway is now operated as the Looe Valley Line, and trains approaching the crossing are obliged to halt and sound their whistle before proceeding across the road subject to a 10 mph (16 km/h) speed limit.

As of April 2021, the crossing was one of 62 open level crossings listed by Network Rail, and is one of three such crossings on the Looe Valley Line. Open crossings account for approximately 1% of the 6,180 level crossings operated or maintained by Network Rail.
