= Looe Music Festival =

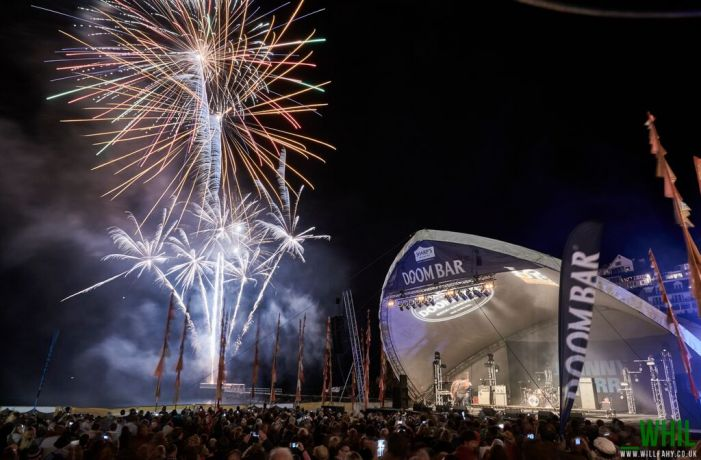
- The beach stage in 2015
- Dates: September
- Locations: Looe, Cornwall, England
- Years active: 2011–present
- Website: http://www.looelive.co.uk

Looe Music Festival is a not-for-profit music festival that takes place in the fishing town of Looe during a weekend in September. The festival starts on Friday and lasts for three days. Originally there were three venues all around Looe – this has increased to five in 2016. Along with the official venues, bands and musicians play in various pubs and restaurants around the town during the weekend.

== History ==
Looe Music Festival was started in 2011 by members of the Looe community and took place between 23 and 25 September. It received a great response from the public and has grown to become one of the town's biggest attractions.

In November 2017 Cornwall Live contacted the organisers of the festival after being told by several artists that they had not been paid for their performances last year. Looe Music Festival Ltd was dissolved on 30 January. It had been incorporated on 26 August 2016.
