= St Martin's Church, St Martin-by-Looe =

St Martin’s Church, St Martin-by-Looe
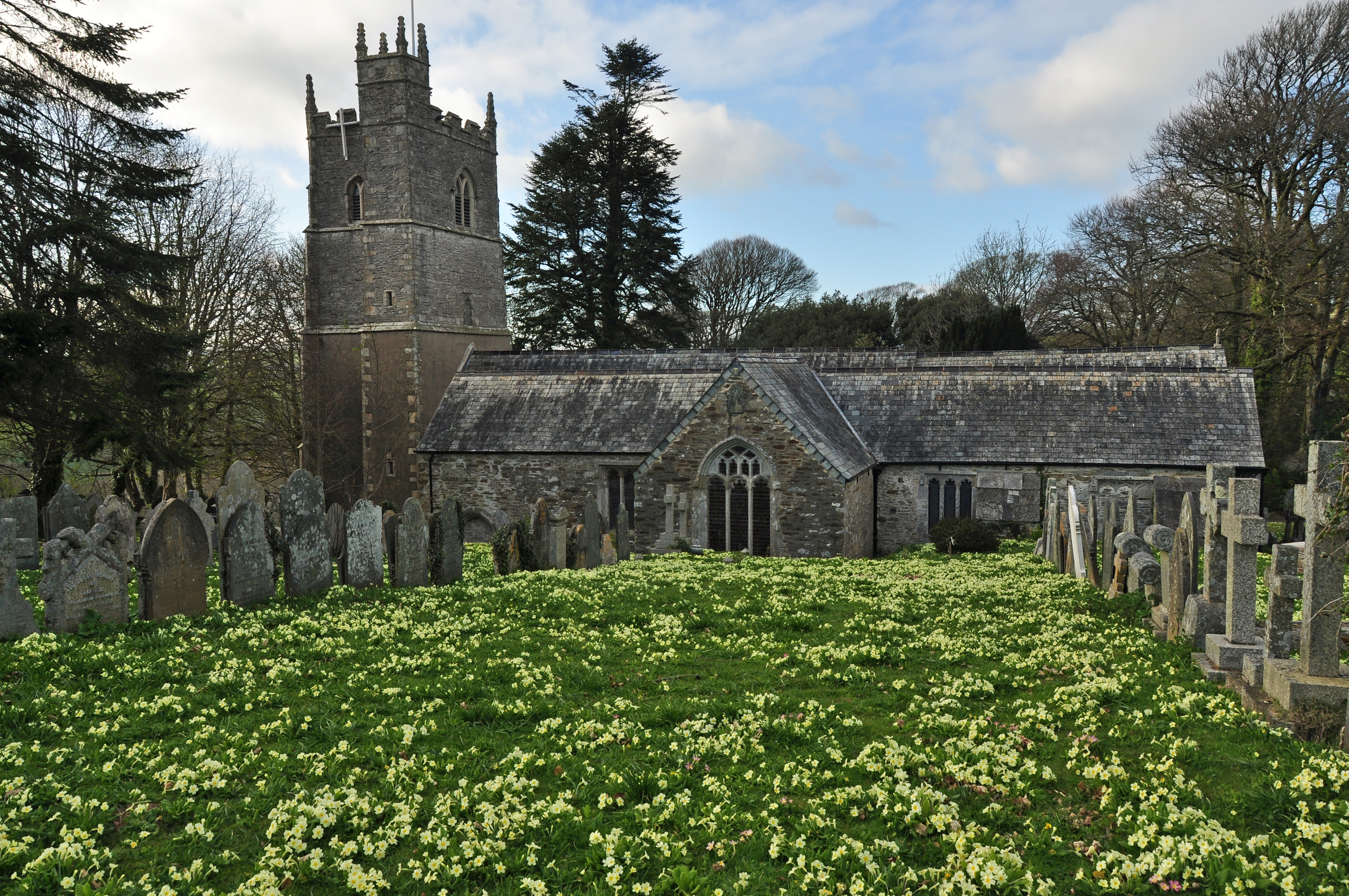
- St Martin’s Church, St Martin-by-Looe

- Location within Cornwall
- 50°22′9.9″N 04°26′53.4″W
- Location: St Martin, Cornwall
- Country: England
- Denomination: Church of England
- Website: anglicanchurcheslooe.weebly.com

History
- Dedication: St Keyne and St Martin of Tours

Administration
- Province: Canterbury
- Diocese: Truro
- Archdeaconry: Bodmin
- Deanery: West Wivelshire
- Parish: St Martin with East and West Looe

Listed Building – Grade I
- Official name: Church of St Martin by Looe
- Designated: 19 March 1951
- Reference no.: 1282854

St Martin's Church is a parish church in the hamlet of St Martin, Looe, Cornwall, in the Church of England Diocese of Truro.

== History and description ==
The church dates from the 13th, 14th and 15th centuries. It was restored in 1882 and also in 1907 at a cost of £400 (equivalent to £41,600 in 2025) when the eastern portion of the church floor was lowered, the walls underpinned and the pillars were straightened. A heating system was installed and the lancet window was opened up. It was re-opened for worship by the Venerable Archdeacon Henry Du Boulay. Until 1845 it was the parish church of East Looe; an early vicar was Sir William de Bodrygan (1280), one of the family of lords who granted that town its early privileges. The south aisle was once reserved to the townspeople, close to the pews where sat the mayor and corporation. the parclose screen (1612) was due to the Langdons of Keverell whose squire used the squint to watch the preacher.

There is a Norman doorway and a Norman font and wagon roofs of the 15th century. There is a fine collection of modern carved woodwork, including the choir stalls, the benches in the nave and a memorial to an officer who served in India. Other features of interest are the tomb of Philip Maiowe in the chancel, a monument to Walter Langdon (died 1676) and his wife in one of the aisles and a memorial tablet to Jonathan Toup, a notable Greek scholar, who was rector of this parish and also vicar of St Merryn. Toup was buried under the communion table of the church. A small marble tablet was erected to his memory on the south wall of the church by his niece Phillis Blake. The tablet states that the excellence of Toup's scholarship was "known to the learned throughout Europe." The inscription on a round brass plate beneath the tablet records that the cost was defrayed by the delegates of the Oxford University Press.

== Organ ==
A new organ costing £260 (equivalent to £26,800 in 2025) by Henry Speechley was opened on 2 May 1878 by J. Nicholson of St Bartholomew's Church, London. A specification of the organ can be found on the National Pipe Organ Register.

== Bells ==
The tower currently has six bells cast in 1882 by John Taylor & Co.

== Parish status ==
Until 1845 the ecclesiastical parish included East Looe where there was a chapel of St Mary. The church is dedicated to St Keyne and St Martin and in historical records is sometimes called Keyne the Greater. The advowson belonged to the lords of Pendrim.

The church is in a joint parish with

- St Wenna's Church, Morval
- St Nicholas' Church, West Looe
