= Liskeard and Looe Union Canal =

Former canal in Cornwall, United Kingdom

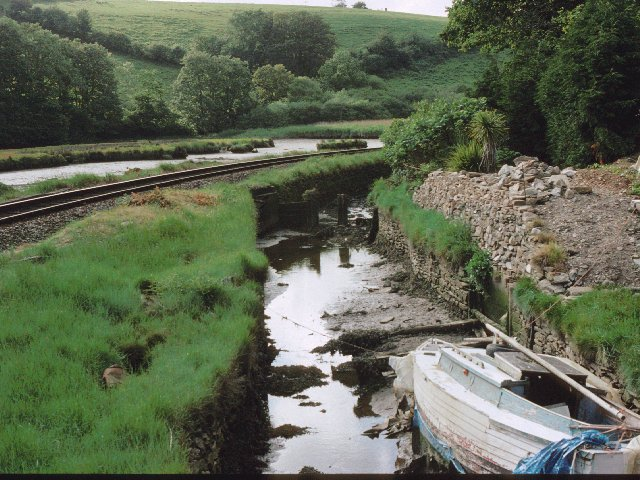
- The remains of a lock on the defunct canal
- Interactive map of Liskeard and Looe Union Canal

Specifications
- Locks: 24
- Status: defunct

History
- Principal engineer: Robert Coad
- Date of act: 1825
- Date completed: 1828
- Date closed: 1910

Geography
- Start point: Liskeard
- End point: Looe
- Connects to: River Looe

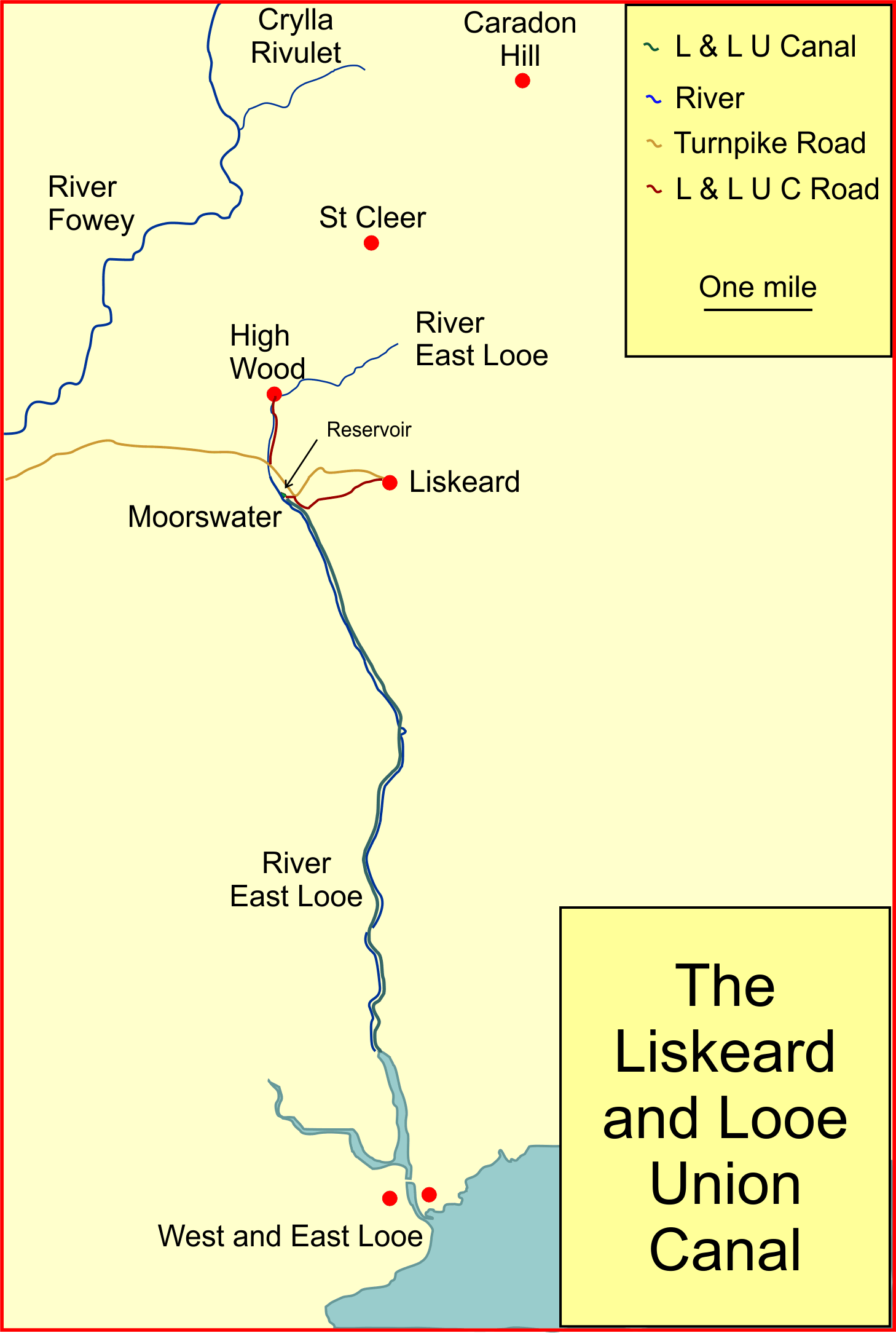
Liskeard and Looe Union Canal

The Liskeard and Looe Union Canal was a broad canal between Liskeard and Looe in Cornwall, United Kingdom. It was almost 6 miles (9.7 km) long and had 24 locks, and it opened progressively from 1827. The engineer was Robert Coad.

Its primary purpose originally was the carriage of sea sand and lime to improve the acidic soil of agricultural lands, but when mineral deposits on Caradon Hill were exploited, it benefited considerably, carrying the mineral down to Looe Harbour. The trade increased so much that a railway—the Liskeard and Looe Railway—was built alongside its course by the Canal Company, and the canal itself gradually ceased to be navigable.

== General description ==
The canal started from a point on the tidal East Looe River just below Terras Bridge, about a mile (about 1.5 km) above Looe bridge. When the railway branch line was built, a bridge over the canal was made, and this bridge can still be seen, showing the alignment of the canal at its lower termination.

The canal ran broadly north, following closely the course of the river itself, for a distance of 5.9 miles (9.5 km), terminating at Moorswater, in the valley to the west of Liskeard. This involved a considerable climb, of 156 feet (48 m) over its length, and there were 24 locks. The canal ran on the east side of the River, except between a point below Plashford Bridge to near Landreast bridge, The present day railway branch line closely follows the route of the canal.

Moorswater was chosen as a feasible terminal because of its altitude—below Liskeard town—and proximity to the agricultural lands the canal was built to serve. Roads for onward transport were built, eastward to Liskeard itself and northward to Highwood.

There was a basin at Moorswater, located in the area near the present-day railway level crossing, close to the point where Old Road crosses under the A38 main road. A reservoir was built immediately north of the basin area.

It was designed for 20 tonne barges; water supply was from the upper reaches of the East Looe River and the Crylla.

When the railway line was built in 1860, the canal gradually fell into disrepair, and is shown as "disused" on 1882 Ordnance Survey maps, although the short southern section to Sandplace continued in use for several years

Priestley, published in 1831, described the canal:

The Liskeard and Looe Canal commences at Tarras Pill, and proceeds from thence in a northerly direction to the parish of Liskeard terminating at Moorswater, 145 feet (44 m)] above the level of the sea. The distance which it passes over is five miles and seven furlongs, [9.5 km] and in its course there are twenty-five locks. ... There is a short branch of about a mile in length to Sand Place.

Priestley incorporates a number of inaccuracies into his description: he has taken the number of locks from the authorising act of Parliament; in fact there were twenty-four. There was a wharf at Sandplace (Sand Place) but it was immediately adjacent to the main line of the canal; Messenger points out that a quay was dug into the river bank at Sandplace to serve a kiln, and Priestley was misled into thinking that this was a branch of the canal; actually it was the main river. The vertical interval he quotes may be due to the definition of "sea level" at the time; in any case the lower end of the canal joined the river some distance above the sea.

== Origins ==
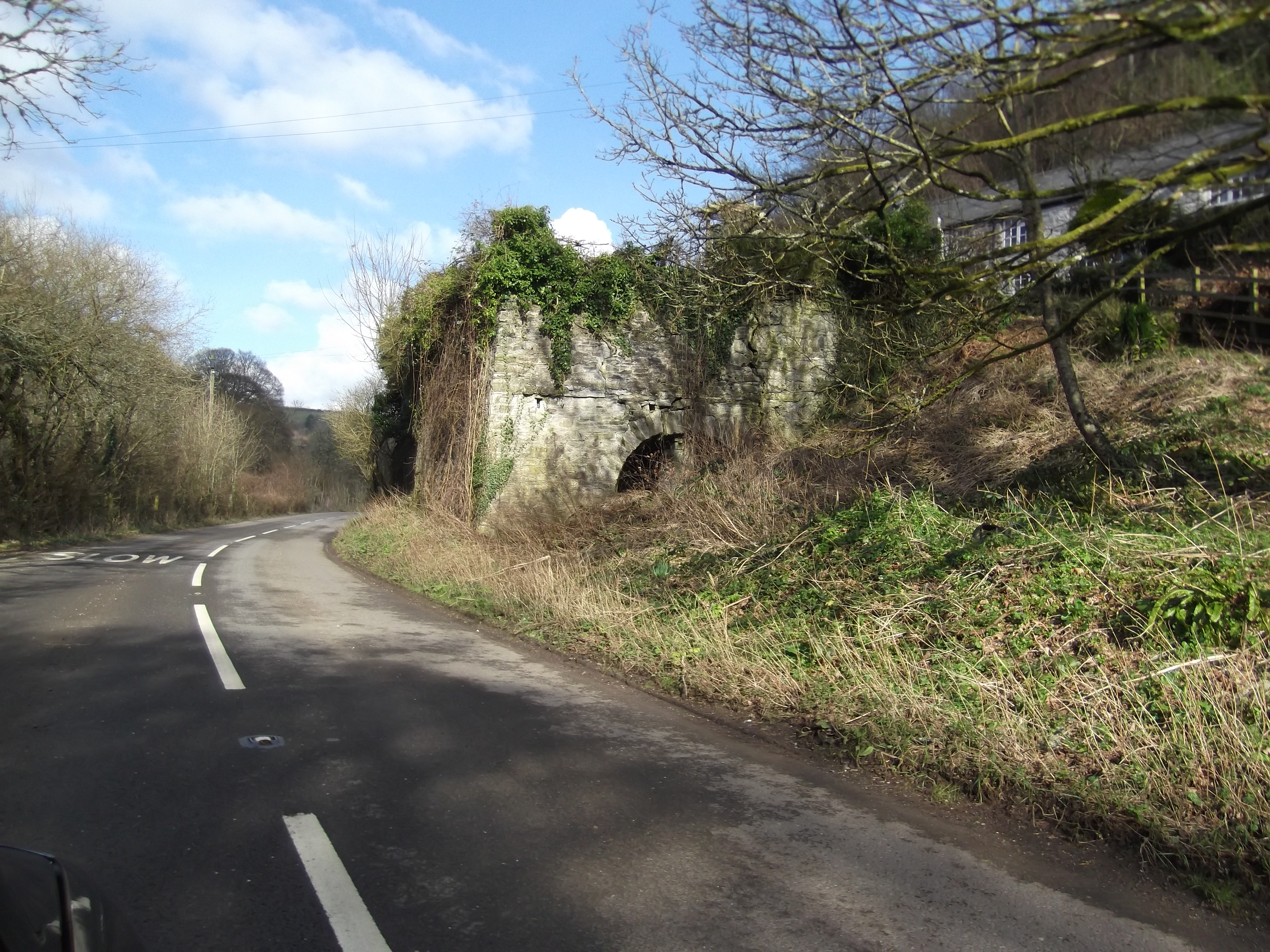
Ruined limekiln at Sandplace; when the canal opened limekilns opened at Moorswater and lime by-passed Sandplace

Agricultural land around the Looe valleys was considered to be of high quality, but the acidic soil required annual improvement with lime. Traditionally the limestone to prepare this had come from the Plymouth area by coastal shipping to the East Looe Valley where it was burnt in kilns to make the lime. While the coastal shipping element of the journey was straightforward, even main roads were in a primitive condition; for example:

Despite its grand title, it would seem that the 'Royal Cornish Way' (today's A30) was little better than a muddy cart-track by the beginning of the 18th century. In places it may well have had no defined edge or surface at all, leaving travellers to struggle as best they could in mist or darkness.

To get to Liskeard above the navigable river, the means of transport was on the backs of horses: the first wheeled wagon was introduced into the Liskeard district in 1790. As late as the 1830s, pack horses and mules were the general means of transport for goods throughout the county, once off the turnpike roads. Approaching 10 tonnes (11 short tons) of limestone were required per acre annually (about 25 tonnes per hectare), so that its transport was a considerable undertaking. (Note: From Messenger's figures, page 9: four to five tons of lime per acre annually; 14.5 tons of limestone required for 100 "double Winchester bushels" of 150 lbs of lime. One tonne is taken as close to one imperial ton.)

The idea for a canal to Liskeard was first investigated in 1777 when Edmund Leach and "a gentleman from Liskeard" proposed a canal which would run between Banka Mill, 1 3/4 miles (2.8 km) west of Liskeard, and Sandplace, 2 miles (3.2 km) to the north of Looe on the East Looe River. It would have been a contour canal, with three reaches connected by "machines"—evidently inclined planes. At the time no canal inclined plane had been installed anywhere in the world: the first actually installed on a canal was on the Ketley Canal in 1788. The project was estimated to cost £17,495, which would be recouped in seven years, based on expected income, but the scheme was not progressed.

After at least one other abortive proposal, a local solicitor Peter Glubb convened a meeting on 2 August 1823 in Liskeard to agree the way forward. After a second meeting at East Looe on 9 August, the engineer James Green was asked to present proposals for a canal, a railway or a turnpike road to link Looe to Liskeard. He swiftly presented his views, on 30 August, recommending a tub-boat canal, suitable for four-ton boats in trains (i.e. connected groups). The rise of 180 feet in 6.25 miles (10,060 m) in 10 km) threatened water supply difficulties if negotiated by locks, so Green repeated the earlier proposal for two inclined planes.

A subscription list was quickly filled, but soon this proposal too stalled, due to strong opposition from interests in Lostwithiel and Fowey, and "weakness of the proprietors in a pecuniary point of view and other insuperable obstacles". The following year the plan was revived, this time for a canal with locks. In order to appease John Buller, a substantial local landowner, the canal would have a "Towing Path of sufficient width for Gentlemen's Carriages". The committee needed Buller's support to aid the passage of the bill through Parliament.

Liskeard and Looe Canal Act 1825
- Act of Parliament
- Parliament of the United Kingdom
- Long title: An Act for making and maintaining a navigable Canal from Tarras Pill, in the Parish of Duloe, in the County of Cornwall, to or near Moors Water, in the Parish of Liskeard in the said County, and for making several Roads to communicate therewith.
- Citation: 6 Geo. 4. c. clxiii

Dates
- Royal assent: 22 June 1825

Text of statute as originally enacted

Green prepared plans for a bill, and the necessary act of Parliament, the Liskeard and Looe Canal Act 1825 (6 Geo. 4. c. clxiii), was obtained on 22 June 1825, but after Green's departure, the proprietors asked Robert Coad to design the route in detail. The act created the Liskeard and Looe Union Canal Company, with an authorised capital of £13,000 in shares of £25, and authority to borrow a further £10,000 on mortgage if required. The act gave powers "for making and maintaining a navigable canal from Tarras Pill, in the parish of Duloe ... to or near Moorswater, in the parish of Liskeard, and for making several Roads to communicate therewith". It also allowed feed water to be taken from the River Looe and the "Crylla Rivulet"; but there were restrictions on the latter, so "that no injury may be done to the navigation of the Fowey, of which river the Crylla is a tributary stream". An engineer could be appointed by the Mayor of Lostwithiel to monitor compliance with this obligation.

Inclined planes may not have been ruled out, because Priestley says that "The company are also empowered to make rollers and inclined planes." However Priestley does not offer this as a direct quotation from the act, and he may have heard this reported from an earlier, unsuccessful bill, and mistakenly understood the plan to be still current.

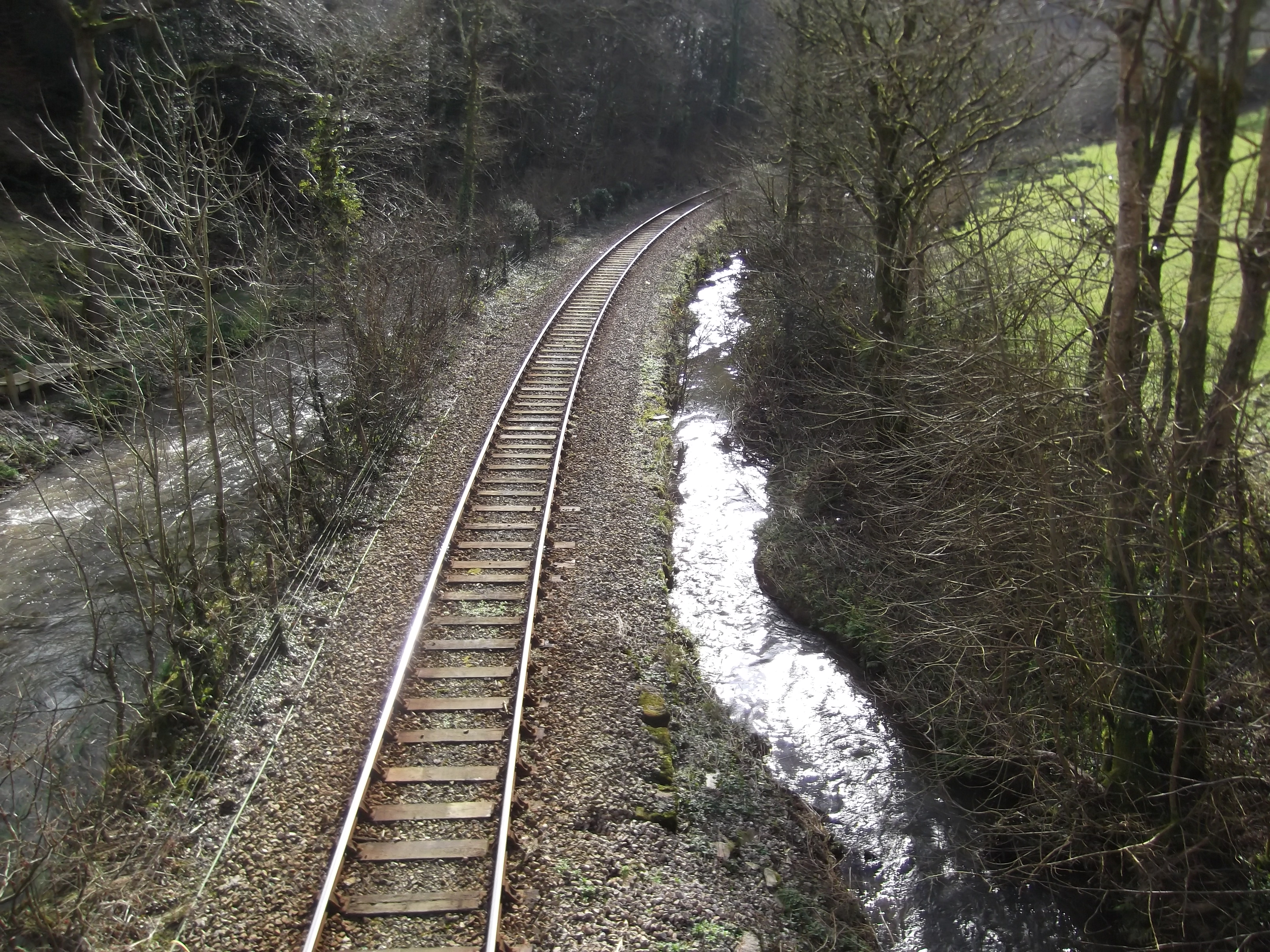
A view looking south at Plashford Bridge; the East Looe River is on the left; then the railway line to Looe; then the remains of the canal

Work on building the canal began on 6 September 1825, with Robert Coad as the engineer and Robert Retallick as Superintendent of Works. There was some internal tension in the committee of management, for there was a motion at the general meeting in February 1826 that a properly qualified civil engineer should be asked to assess the work done so far, and whether the two men should be allowed to proceed without further assistance, but the motion was defeated by 49 votes to 10, and four of the nine Committee members changed at the subsequent election.

The canal had been planned to run on the west side of the river towards Looe, but a landowner, Mr Eliot, was holding out for excessive compensation for his land, and the construction was transferred to the east side over the affected length, in the lands of John Buller, to by-pass Eliot's land. During the construction, the company operated a health insurance scheme for the labourers similar to that commonly in place in the Cornish mines, with each worker contributing 6 pence (2.5p) per month, which was used to pay Mr. Robert Rean, an apothecary and surgeon from East Looe, for his services.

== Opening ==
Part of the canal opened for traffic on 27 August 1827, and in March 1828 the Royal Cornwall Gazette reported that it was complete. It rose through 156 feet (48 m) over its length of 5.9 miles (9.5 km)

Although the canal was in full operation, there were numerous challenges facing the proprietors. The works were "in a slovenly and unfinished state", and it took until 1830 for the reservoir at Moorswater and the feed from the Crylla to be completed. A road had to be made from Moorswater into Liskeard at Dean Well, at a cost of £1,200, completed in 1829. Dean Well was at the north-western extremity of Dean Street, so the road referred to would appear to be "New Road". Traffic immediately transferred to this road from the steep and inconvenient turnpike road ("Old Road") and the canal company demanded a subscription for maintenance from the Turnpike Trustees. Users of the Canal Company's road were subject to tolls.

About 1835 a section of road from Looe Mills to Highwood was constructed by the canal company. Highwood is a little less than a mile (about 1 km) north of Looe Mills, on the Turnpike Road north-west of Moorswater. The new road gave access to Highwood from the canal, using the Turnpike Road from Moorswater to Looe Mills.

== Operation ==
The canal vastly increased the facility of bringing lime and sea sand to the agricultural hinterland above Liskeard; in addition coal was brought for lime burning and for domestic use. Prices of these commodities fell considerably; however other traffics—particularly downstream traffic which would have generated return loads—were disappointing. Lime was burnt at Moorswater and elsewhere on the higher reaches of the canal, leading to the failure of kilns at Sandplace, which lost trade.

The company watched expenditure carefully, but managed to pay a dividend of 6 per cent in 1830 and 5 per cent thereafter for most of the canal's life. Income was generally allocated to capital expenditure. Net annual profit seems to have been in the region of £300 to £400 during this period. Considerable attention was given to improving the terminal facilities at Moorswater, as the trade increased. In 1832 a quay 130 by 26 feet (39.6 by 7.9 metres) was constructed, and a tramway (referred to as a "railroad") was constructed alongside it. William Hodge and John Lyne had lime kilns on the west and east side of the canal head respectively, and they had simple plateways connecting the basin with the kilns by inclined planes powered by waterwheels. Hodge's had a gauge of 2 ft 6 in gauge (760 mm), was supported by a series of pillars and used an undershot wheel. Lyne built five kilns in 1831, and water from a pond to the north of the works was channelled along a culvert to power an overshot wheel.

By 1835 the poor condition of the canal works was again giving cause for concern, and contract arrangements were put in place to rectify the situation. However, the unsatisfactory state of affairs was slow to be rectified, and complaints about the conditions and measures put in place by the directors continued to dominate the minute books until at least 1851. From 1842 the company became concerned at the gradual decline in usage of the canal and of income. This was due to a general agricultural depression, and also competition from St Germans and Lerryn (on an arm of the River Fowey); the company repeatedly reduced dues on the canal.

== Mineral extraction on Caradon ==
Copper ore had been discovered on Caradon in 1836, and as the volume of extraction grew, it had been taken to St Germans and elsewhere for onward transport. From 1839 granite too began to be seriously quarried at the Cheesewring. Moving the minerals by pack horse was expensive and inconvenient, and the Liskeard and Caradon Railway was promoted to bring the ore to Moorswater; the canal company made room at their terminal for the railway. The railway reached that place in 1846, on 8 March, from when the ore was taken to Looe on the Canal.

This transformed the economy of the canal and of the area. Mineral ore could now be brought relatively conveniently to market: by railway to Moorswater; by canal boat to Looe; and onwards by coastal shipping. This not only brought about transfer of the transportation from other routes to the benefit of the canal, but it encouraged further exploration and mineral extraction, which then further augmented carrying on the canal. The new mines required coal for operation of their engines, and also iron products, and these traffics also used the canal.

This vastly increased volume of traffic caused the company to extend considerably the wharf facilities at Moorswater. There were also concerns about the adequacy of the water supply with the increased use of the locks, and there was considerable friction between the company and millers higher up the East Looe Valley over use of water.

Some limited statistics have survived:

in 1849, 21,713 tons were carried, of which 7,546 tons were copper ore, and 6,175 tons were coal;
in 1859, 48,193 tons were carried, of which 17,361 tons were copper ore and 15,712 tons were coal, as well as 8,297 tons of granite.

Messenger (2001) says that the profit each year was about £2,000.

== Proposals for a railway ==
At the later date, the canal was working at capacity, and the transshipment at Moorswater from rail to canal was costing from 4d to 6d per ton; because of congestion on the canal, trade was being lost to competing routes via Calstock and St Germans; and the twenty-four locks caused the journey to be slow and cumbersome. Moreover, the Cornwall Railway was being constructed to run through Liskeard, with unknown implications for the competitiveness of the canal. Attention was given to constructing a railway from Moorswater to Looe.

A report was presented on 30 September 1857, which proposed a railway at a cost of £11,000, and this was quickly approved. Although there was some opposition from Buller's son, also called John, and from the Admiralty, who were concerned about navigation on the river, the Duchy of Cornwall helped the company to obtain its authorising act of Parliament, the Liskeard and Looe Railway Act 1858 (21 & 22 Vict. c. xi), which was granted on 11 May 1858. It authorised the canal company to raise additional capital of £13,000 in £25 shares, with authority to borrow £4,000. Two of the clauses in the 1825 act were repealed, relating to penalties for destroying the canal.

The Liskeard and Looe Railway opened on 27 December 1860 for goods traffic, passenger traffic following in 1879.

== The canal after the railway ==
The railway did not take over the canal alignment: it crossed the canal by bridge in five places, three below Sandplace and two above, although the railway seems to have obliterated the canal in the northern extremity. Sandplace continued to be a significant wharf for the canal, due to the activities of John Buller, but it appears that the canal above that point, although not actually displaced by the railway construction, was positively allowed to decline. Although the canal was still officially open, the Liskeard Water Company negotiated the takeover of the Crylla Leat and its water supply from May 1861, subsequently agreeing to pay £5 per year for its perpetual use. With no water supply to the top of the canal, water was channeled through a culvert under the railway to keep the section below Sandplace navigable. The canal was still maintained, as £179 was spent on repairs between 1862 and 1867, but it is fairly certain that this only affected the lower section. The upper section may have been used by the tenants of the Morval Estate for the transport of agricultural produce, for which no tolls were chargeable, but residents at Duloe complained in 1867 that the canal could no longer be used since the railway had been built. A note in the accounts for 1862 states: "1861: LLUC's canal replaced by railway and steam introduced on the LCR."

Decline of navigability continued steadily, and only small boats could make any passage at all. Between 1901 and 1909, the annual gross dues averaged 35 shillings (£1.75), mainly derived from tolls of 3 pence (1.25p) for small boats of about 1.5 tons carrying sand and seaweed, which was used to improve the land. Two of the original 16-ton boats were still operational, and were charged 1s 9d (8.75p) for the journey to Sandplace.

The Great Western Railway purchased the canal company by the Great Western Railway, Liskeard and Looe, and Liskeard and Caradon Railways Act 1909 (9 Edw. 7. c. xiii), in order to acquire the railway line, passenger traffic, and especially tourism, having taken over as the dominant traffic. The Liskeard and Caradon Railway closed in 1917 but the Liskeard and Looe Railway still operates, with passenger trains on the line being marketed under the brand name "The Looe Valley Line".

== Conservation ==
Towards the end of the twentieth century, there was some interest in conserving what remains of the canal. In 1988 the West Country branch of the Inland Waterways Association produced a walking guide to the canal, and to several others in the West Country, hoping to stimulate interest in it. In 1997, Caradon District Council announced plans for a partial restoration of the remains, although not to a navigable standard. However, there is no publicity available at present (2012) to indicate whether this work was carried out.

== Points of interest ==
Point	Coordinates (Links to map resources)	OS Grid Ref	Notes
Canal Basin, Moorswater	50.4512°N 4.4860°W	SX236642	
Lock and Lamellion Mill Bridge	50.4459°N 4.4817°W	SX238636	
Old lock	50.4349°N 4.4742°W	SX243623	
Trussel Bridge	50.4319°N 4.4712°W	SX245620	
Old lock	50.4301°N 4.4696°W	SX246618	
Old lock	50.4281°N 4.4677°W	SX248616	
Old lock	50.4252°N 4.4655°W	SX249612	
Old lock and Landreast Bridge	50.4232°N 4.4636°W	SX251610	
Aqueduct over East Looe River	50.4189°N 4.4607°W	SX252605	
Old lock	50.4154°N 4.4601°W	SX253601	
Old lock	50.4123°N 4.4629°W	SX251598	
Old lock and Landlooe Bridge	50.4091°N 4.4648°W	SX249594	
Old lock, Causeland	50.4056°N 4.4665°W	SX248591	
Old lock	50.3971°N 4.4658°W	SX248581	
Old lock and Plashford Bridge	50.3950°N 4.4645°W	SX249579	
Terras Lock	50.3749°N 4.4644°W	SX248556	

This shows the locations of locks which were still identified as such on the 1882 Ordnance Survey map. 13 of the original 24 are shown. At Moorswater, the railway has obliterated the terminal basin by that date.

== Bibliography ==
- Bodman, Martin (2012). Inclined Planes in the South West. Chacewater: Twelveheads Press. ISBN 978-0-906294-75-8.
- Hadfield, Charles (1967). The Canals of South West England. David and Charles. ISBN 978-0-7153-4176-6.
- MacDermot, E T (1931). History of the Great Western Railway. Vol. II. London: Great Western Railway.
- Messenger, Michael (2001). Caradon & Looe – The canal, railways and mines. Twelveheads Press. ISBN 978-0-906294-46-8.
- Page, William, ed. (1906). The Victoria County History of the County Of Cornwall. Vol. 1. James Street, London.
- Popplewell, Lawrence (1977). The Railways, Canal and Mines of Looe and Liskeard. Oakwood Press. ISBN 978-0-85361-212-4.
- Priestley, Joseph (1831). "Historical Account of the Navigable Rivers, Canals, and Railways of Great Britain". London: Longman, Rees Orme, Brown and Green. Archived from the original on 4 March 2016.
- Smith, John R (2008). "Section 11: Transport and communications". Bodmin Moor: An Archaeological survey. Vol. 2. English Heritage. ISBN 978-1-873592-62-5.
- Squires, Roger (2008). Britain's restored canals. Landmark Publishing. ISBN 978-1-84306-331-5.

== See also ==
Media related to Liskeard and Looe Union Canal at Wikimedia Commons

- Canals of Great Britain
- History of the British canal system
