= Looe Guildhall =

Municipal building in Looe, Cornwall, England

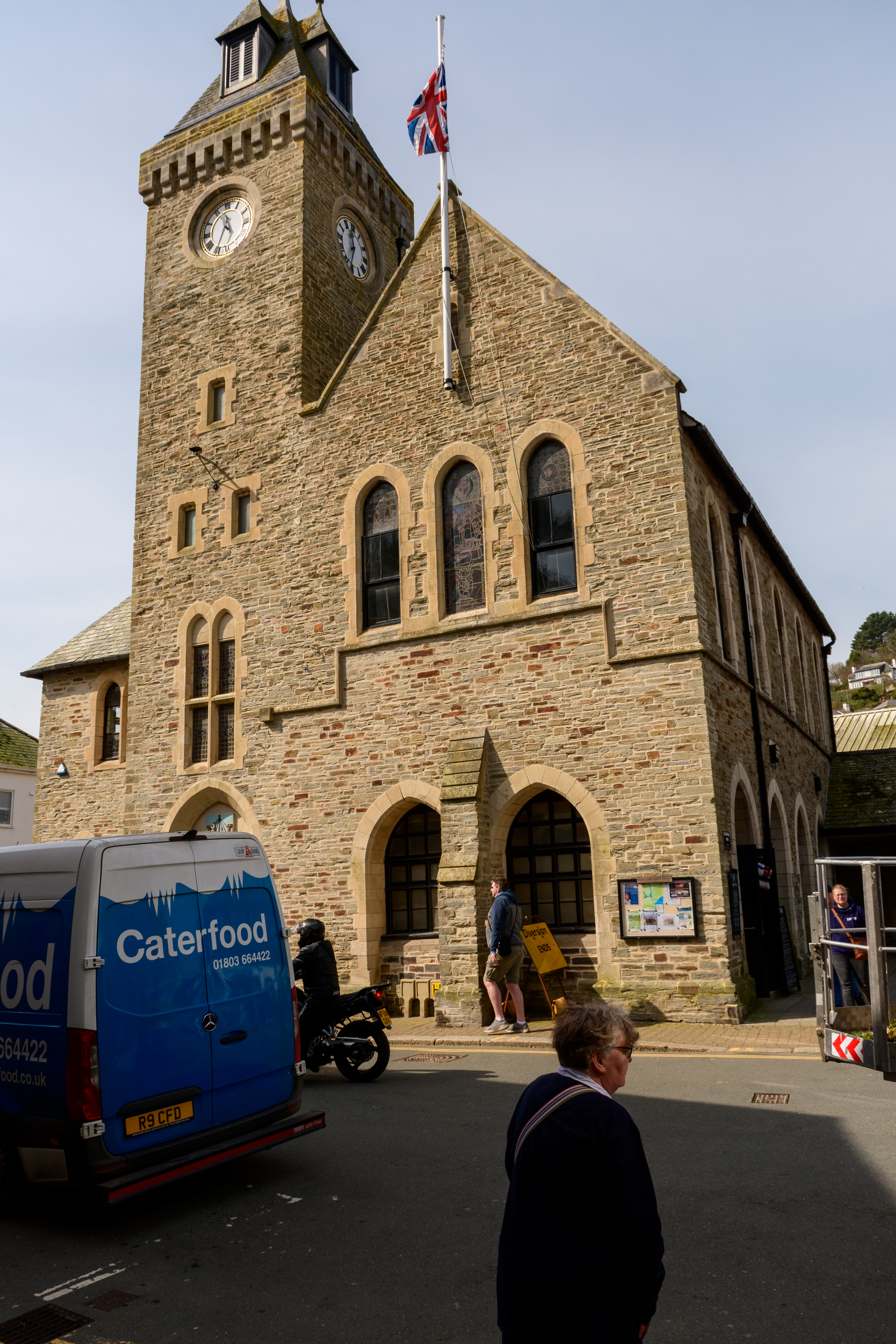
- Looe Guildhall

- Shown in Cornwall
- 50.3546°N 4.4544°W
- Location: Fore Street, Looe, Cornwall, England

History
- Built: 1877

Site notes
- Architect: John Ford Gould
- Architectural style: Gothic Revival style

Listed Building – Grade II
- Official name: Guildhall
- Designated: 17 September 1973
- Reference no.: 1280863

Looe Guildhall is a municipal building in Fore Street in Looe, Cornwall, England. The structure, which is currently used as a community events venue, is a Grade II listed building.

== History ==
The building was commissioned to replace the Old Guildhall in High Market Street which dated from around 1450. The new building was designed by John Ford Gould of Barnstaple in the Gothic Revival style, built by Samuel Honey of West Looe in rubble masonry with ashlar stone dressings and was officially opened on 13 September 1877.

The design involved an asymmetrical main frontage facing onto Fore Street. The left-hand bay was formed by a four-stage clock tower which was 90 feet (27 m) high. The first stage featured a deeply recessed arched doorway, with a shield bearing the town's coat of arms in the tympanum; the second stage contained a pair of mullioned windows, the third stage featured three small lancet windows (one set above the other two) and the fourth stage was originally blind, until a clock was installed in the tower in 1880. The tower was surmounted by a machicolated cornice, a pyramid-shaped roof and a weather vane. The right-hand section featured two arched openings on the ground floor and three mullioned windows on the first floor with a gable above. Internally, the principal rooms were a drill hall on the ground floor, which was used by No. 2 Battery, the 1st Cornwall (Duke of Cornwall's) Artillery Volunteers for training, and the great hall on the first floor, which was also used as a courtroom. Both these rooms were 45 feet (14 m) long and 20 feet (6.1 m) wide. The great hall contained a series of stained glass windows made by Fouracre and Watson of Stonehouse, Plymouth. A local directory described it as "the handsomest public room in the county". The part of the building to the left of the tower contained police cells, an armoury, the harbour commissioners' office and a first-floor Council Chamber.

After East Looe Borough Council, which had met in the guildhall, was abolished under the provisions of the Municipal Corporations Act 1883, the building was transferred to a specially formed entity, the East Looe Town Trust, in 1890. The building became the meeting place of Looe Urban District Council, which had jurisdiction over the communities on both sides of the River Looe, when it was formed in 1898. The new council also took over the management of the East Looe Town Trust.

The guildhall continued to serve as the headquarters of the urban district council for much of the 20th century, but ceased to be the local seat of government after the enlarged Caradon District Council was formed in 1974. However, the building continued to operate as a community events venue and also became an approved location for weddings and civil partnership ceremonies. Work to restore the stained glass windows in the great hall was undertaken in spring 2018, and the building was used as a filming location for the BBC series, Beyond Paradise, which was first broadcast in February 2023.

Works of art in the guildhall include a painting by John Robertson Reid depicting the arrest of a smuggler in West Looe, and a painting by David Wilkie Wynfield depicting Oliver Cromwell's First Appearance in Parliament.
