= St Mary's Church, East Looe =

St Mary’s Church, East Looe
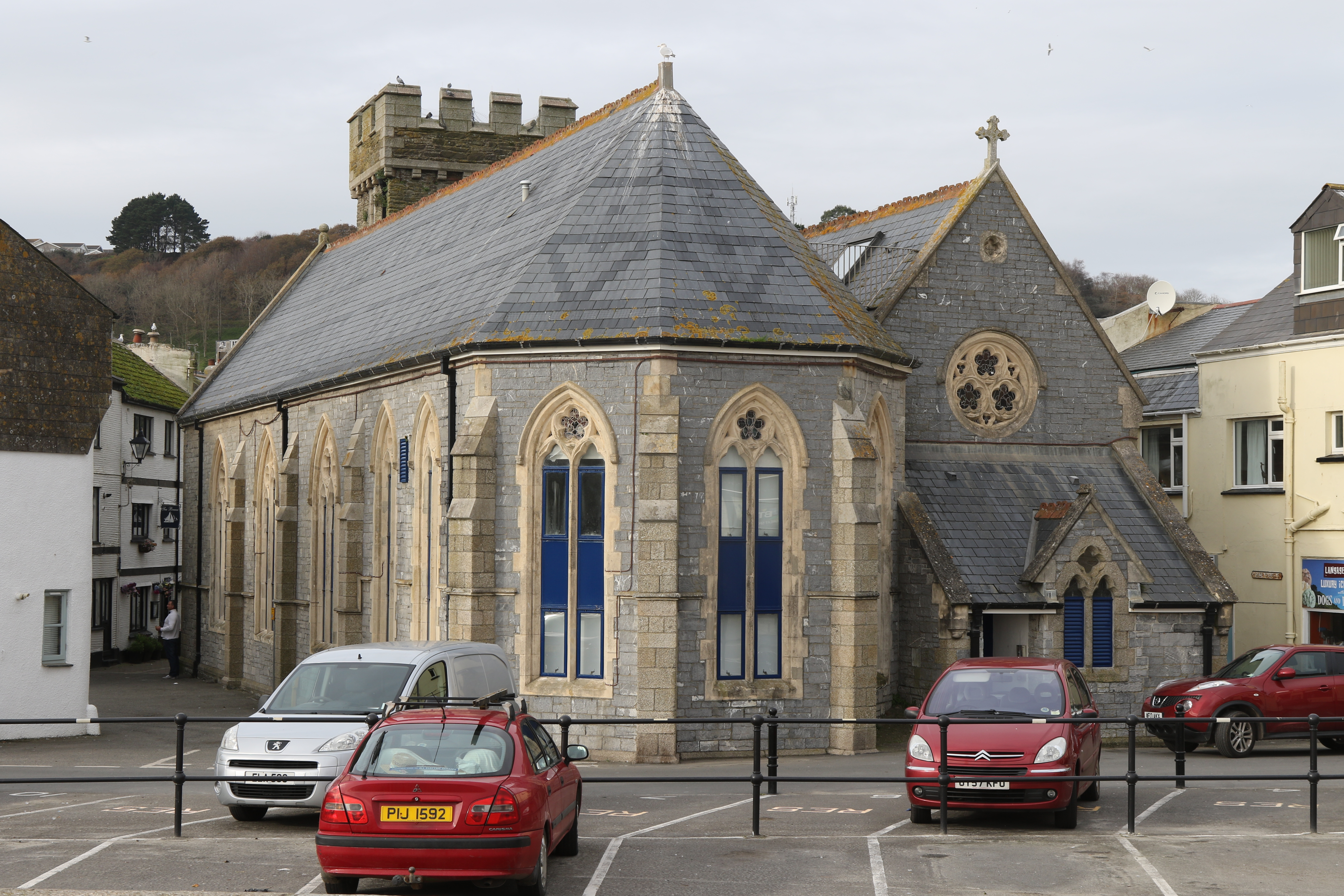
- St Mary’s Church, East Looe

- Location within Cornwall
- 50°21′13.39″N 04°27′13.24″W
- Location: Looe, Cornwall
- Country: England
- Previous denomination: Church of England

History
- Dedication: St Mary the Virgin
- Dedicated: 1259

Architecture
- Heritage designation: Grade II listed
- Architect: Edwin J Munt
- Construction cost: £2,500

Specifications
- Length: 90 feet (27 m)
- Width: 30 feet (9.1 m)

Listed Building – Grade II
- Official name: Church of St Mary
- Designated: 17 September 1973
- Reference no.: 1201107

St Mary's Church is a former Church of England parish church in Looe, Cornwall.

== History ==
The church was dedicated by Walter Branscombe, Bishop of Exeter in 1259. The tower dates from the 15th century, but the rest was largely rebuilt in 1806. This 1806 building survived until replaced in 1882.

In 1882 the Incorporated Society for Promoting, Building, and Repairing of Churches and Chapels awarded the church £125 (equivalent to £13,000 in 2025) towards restoration work. The foundation stone for the new church was laid on 14 August 1882 by Sir Alfred Sherlock Gooch, 9th Baronet. The architect was Edwin James Munt (1850-1937) of London. The contract for £2,100 (equivalent to £218,400 in 2025) was awarded to James Godfrey of Liskeard. The tower was left untouched as it was used as a landmark by the Admiralty and Trinity Board. It was reconstructed 20 feet (6.1 m) longer than the previous church as a nave and north aisle, with pentagonal chancel, in three sides of which there were double-light windows. The nave and aisle were divided by an arcade of four arches. The pillars were of Portland stone, with Devonshire marble shafts. The roofs were of Baltic timber, and the seating was Baltic wood and pitch pine. The floor was laid with Godwin tiles. The church accommodated 360 people. It was consecrated by the Bishop of Truro on 20 August 1883.

In 1892 a new reredos was installed, designed by the architect Edwin J Munt and built by Harry Hems and Sons, in memory of Mrs. Bishop.

By the 1980s the church was declared redundant by the Church of England. In the 1990s it was obtained by the Westcountry Housing Association, and converted into sheltered accommodation. Mark Robinson, stonemason, undertook restoration work to stabilise the building, and also lower some of the windows to provide better daylight on the ground floor.

== Stained glass windows ==
- By Ward and Hughes. Three stained windows in the east end were filled with glass in memory of James R Bishop, died 30 April 1881, depicting the Annunciation, the Presentation of Christ in the Temple, the Visit of the Magi, the Flight into Egypt and Christ in the Temple. A window in memory of Elizabeth Robins, died 31 October 1874 depicting Christ as the Good Shepherd, and Christ blessing the children. A stained rose window.
- By Fouracre of Stonehouse. A window of the Baptism of John, and the temptation of Christ in the Wilderness. A window in memory of Patience Medland, died 13 October 1882, depicting Christ calling the fishermen, and healing the sick.

== Organ ==
A new organ by C Martin of Oxford was installed in 1892. It was rebuilt in 1913. A specification of the organ can be found on the National Pipe Organ Register.
