= St Nicholas' Church, West Looe =

St Nicholas’ Church, West Looe
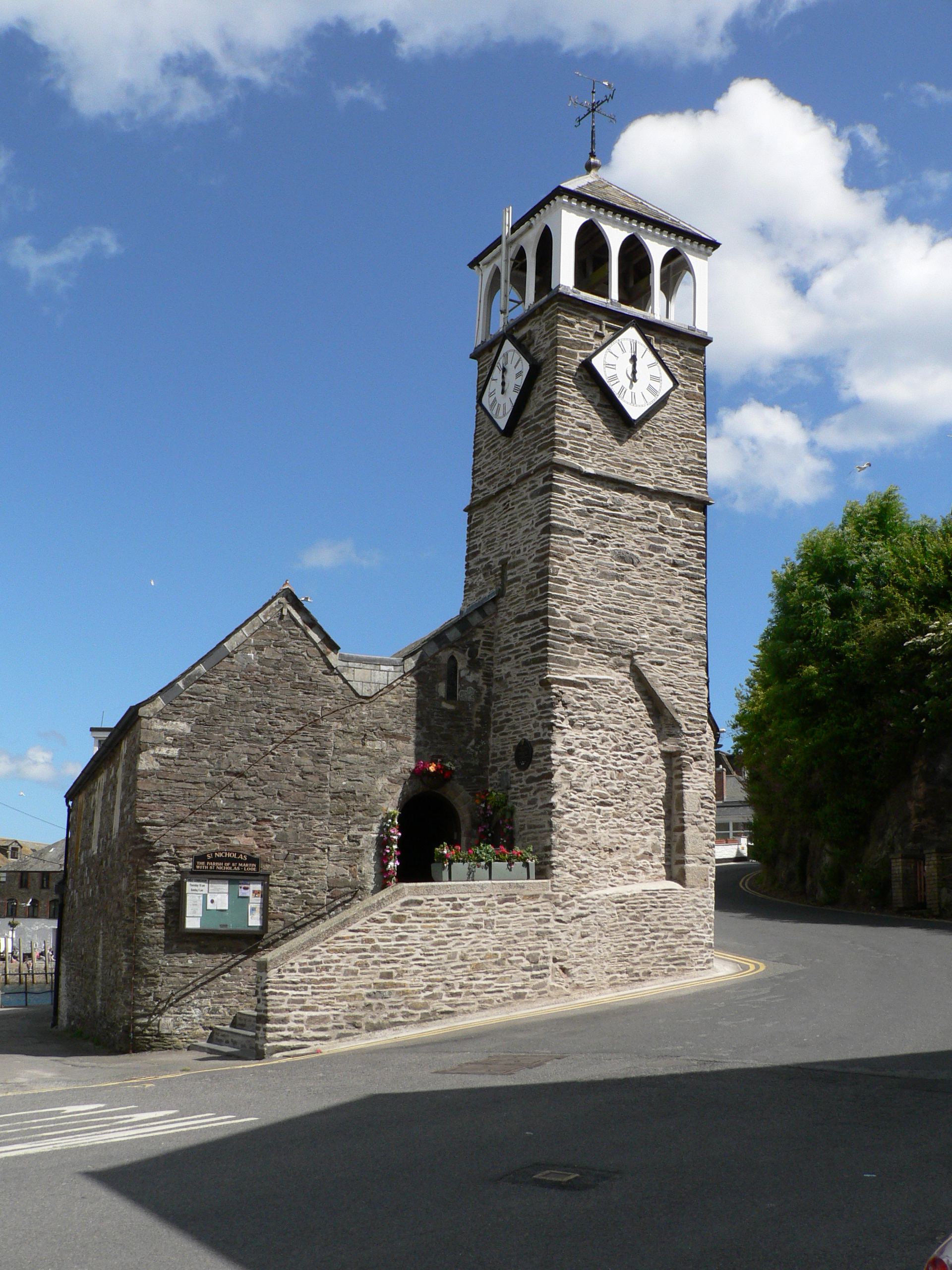
- St Nicholas’ Church, West Looe

- Location within Cornwall
- 50°21′10″N 04°27′20.4″W
- Location: Looe, Cornwall
- Country: England
- Denomination: Church of England
- Churchmanship: Broad Church

History
- Dedication: St Nicholas

Administration
- Province: Canterbury
- Diocese: Truro
- Archdeaconry: Bodmin
- Deanery: West Wivelshire
- Parish: St Martin with East and West Looe

Listed Building – Grade II*
- Official name: Church of St Nicholas
- Designated: 19 March 1951
- Reference no.: 1201132

St Nicholas’ Church, West Looe is a Church of England parish church in Looe, Cornwall.

== History ==
The church, dedicated to St Nicholas, Bishop of Myra was built either in the 13th or 14th century by the D’Aubigny family, who then held the Manors of Looe. It was endowed on 11 July 1336 by parishioners of Talland, and by Sir John Dawnay. The endowment was confirmed by Bishop John Grandisson of Exeter.

During the time of the Commonwealth of England, the Chapel became the Guildhall for West Looe, but was restored for public worship on the accession of King Charles II. This was short-lived, and later it reverted to be the Guildhall and prison until 1852. It was restored for public worship through the efforts of the vicar, Mr. Seymour and John Francis Buller of Morval, with work done by local country tradesmen under the supervision of Captain C. Cocks, when an aisle was added and it re-opened for public worship on All Saints’ Day, 1852. The chancel was lengthened, using timber from the St Josef, a ship captured by Admiral Nelson at the Battle of Cape St Vincent (1797).

== Parish status ==
The church is in a joint parish with

- St Wenna’s Church, Morval
- St Martin’s Church, St Martin-by-Looe
