= Old Guildhall, Looe =

Municipal building in Looe, Cornwall, England

The Old Guildhall
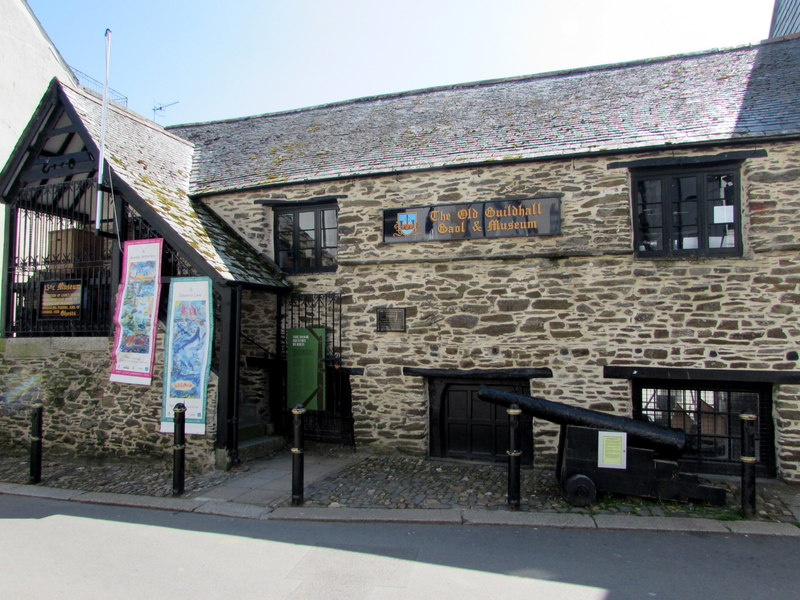

- Shown in Cornwall
- 50.3529°N 4.4530°W
- Location: Higher Market Street, Looe, Cornwall, England

History
- Built: 1450

Site notes
- Architectural style: Medieval style

Listed Building – Grade II*
- Official name: The Old Guildhall (now museum)
- Designated: 19 March 1951
- Reference no.: 1201113

The Old Guildhall is a municipal building in Higher Market Street in Looe, Cornwall, England. The structure, which is currently used as a museum, is a Grade II* listed building.

== History ==
The building was designed in the medieval style, built in rubble masonry and was completed in around 1450. The design involved an asymmetrical main frontage facing onto Higher Market Street, with the first floor originally jettied out over the pavement. After East Looe was incorporated in 1587, the building became the meeting place of the mayor and the local burgesses.

The structure was remodelled in the late 16th century. A new external staircase featuring an external staircase, with a pentice roof, was added on the left of the main frontage, and two new tripartite wood framed windows were added on the right. Internally, the principal rooms were a lock-up, with three cells for incarcerating petty criminals, on the ground floor, and a courtroom, which was also used as a council chamber, on the first floor. The courtroom was used as the venue for petty session hearings, which were held in January and June each year. A magistrates bench and a panel bearing of the Royal coat of arms were installed in the courtroom in 1705 during the reign of Queen Anne.

East Looe had a very small electorate and a dominant patron, John Buller of Morval House, which meant it was recognised by the UK Parliament as a rotten borough. Its right to elect members of parliament was removed by the Reform Act 1832. The building continued to serve as the local seat of government until civic leaders decided that more substantial premises were required and a new guildhall in Fore Street was completed in September 1877. After East Looe Borough Council was abolished under the provisions of the Municipal Corporations Act 1883, the building was transferred to a specially formed entity, the East Looe Town Trust, in 1890.

The internal layout of the building was remodelled, so that the ground floor became a caretaker's flat, and the courtroom became a reading room, in the late 19th century. An extensive programme of refurbishment works, which involved the conversion of both floors into museum space, was completed under the supervision of a local historian, Michael Maddock, in 1972. Exhibits accessioned to the collection include four landscape paintings by Samuel Cook, the town stocks and various artifacts associated with smuggling around Looe Island. There is also a stone cross, dating from the 14th century, which was found at Tregoad Farm in the parish of St Martin-by-Looe in 1906, and a Finbaker cannon, dating from the 17th century, which had been deployed on a Spanish warship and which was recovered from Looe Bay in the 19th century.

== See also ==
- Grade II* listed buildings in Cornwall (Q–Z)
