= Looe Community Academy =

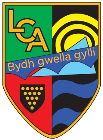

Location
- Sunrising; Looe, Cornwall, PL13 1NQ; England
- Coordinates: 50.36506°N 4.44925°W

Information
- Type: Academy
- Motto: Bydh gwella gylli (Be the best you can be)
- Department for Education URN: 137839 Tables
- Ofsted: Reports
- Headteacher: Paul Boyes
- Gender: Mixed
- Age: 11 to 16
- Enrolment: 531 (2024)
- Website: http://www.looe.cornwall.sch.uk/

Looe Community Academy (formerly Looe Community School) is a mixed secondary school located in East Looe in the English county of Cornwall.

Previously a community school administered by Cornwall Council, Looe Community School was converted to academy status on 1 February 2012 and was renamed Looe Community Academy. However the school continues to coordinate with Cornwall Council for admissions.

Looe Community Academy offers GCSEs, BTECs and OCR Nationals as programmes of study for pupils. The school also offers some vocational courses which are provided off-site through collaboration with other local educational establishments as a part of the South East Cornwall Learning Partnership.
