= Portnadler Bay =

Bay in Cornwall, England

Coordinates: 50.337°N 4.464°W

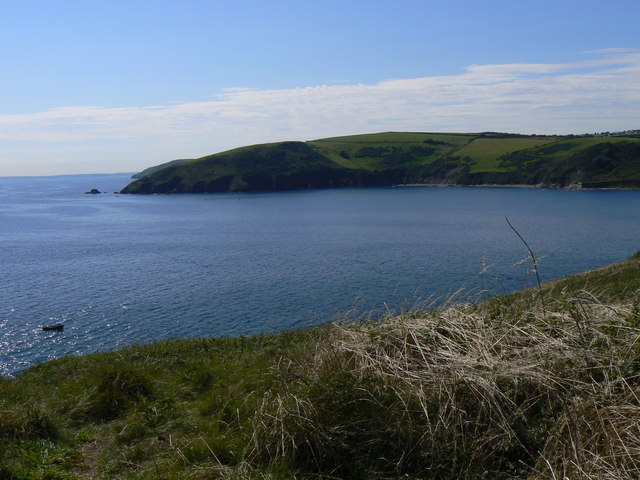
Portnadler Bay, from Looe Island

Portnadler Bay lies 1.5 miles to the south-west of the town of Looe, Cornwall. It contains a secluded beach that is reachable on foot via a steep path that descends from the main coastal path.
