= Monkey Sanctuary =

Animal sanctuary in Cornwall, England

The Monkey Sanctuary
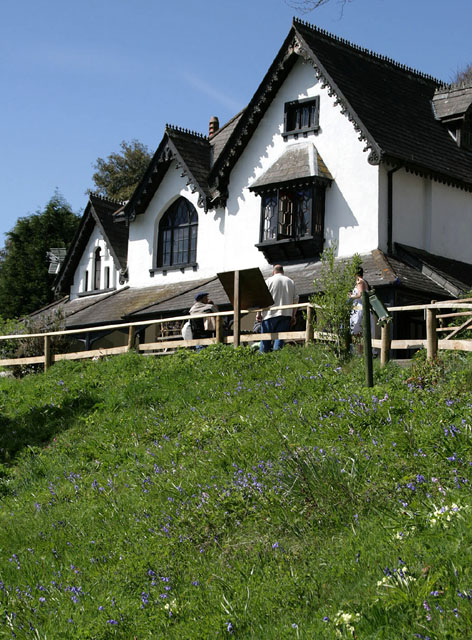
- Interactive map of The Monkey Sanctuary
- 50.3654°N 4.4136°W
- Date opened: 1964
- Date closed: 2026
- Location: Looe, Cornwall, England
- No. of animals: 30
- No. of species: 5
- Owner: Wild Futures
- Director: Sarah Hanson
- Website: www.monkeysanctuary.org

The Monkey Sanctuary was a sanctuary founded in 1964 by Len Williams, father of classical guitarist John Williams, as a cooperative to care for rescued woolly monkeys. Based in Looe, Cornwall, it was home to woolly monkeys descended from the original residents, capuchin monkeys rescued from the British pet trade, marmosets, and a small group of macaques.

A colony of rare lesser horseshoe bats live in the cellar of Murrayton House, a 19th-century building that was used for offices and for accommodation for staff and volunteers.

After a period as a workers' cooperative, the Monkey Sanctuary attained charitable status in 2004, named The Monkey Sanctuary Trust.

In 2025, the Sanctuary site Murrayton House was placed up for sale citing growing financial pressure.

In August 2026, the final and complete closure of The Monkey Sanctuary was announced due to the site not being suitable for long term sanctuary use, and the financial difficulties facing the charity.
