= Looe =

Town in Cornwall, England

Coordinates: 50.354°N 4.454°W

Looe: Cornish: Logh
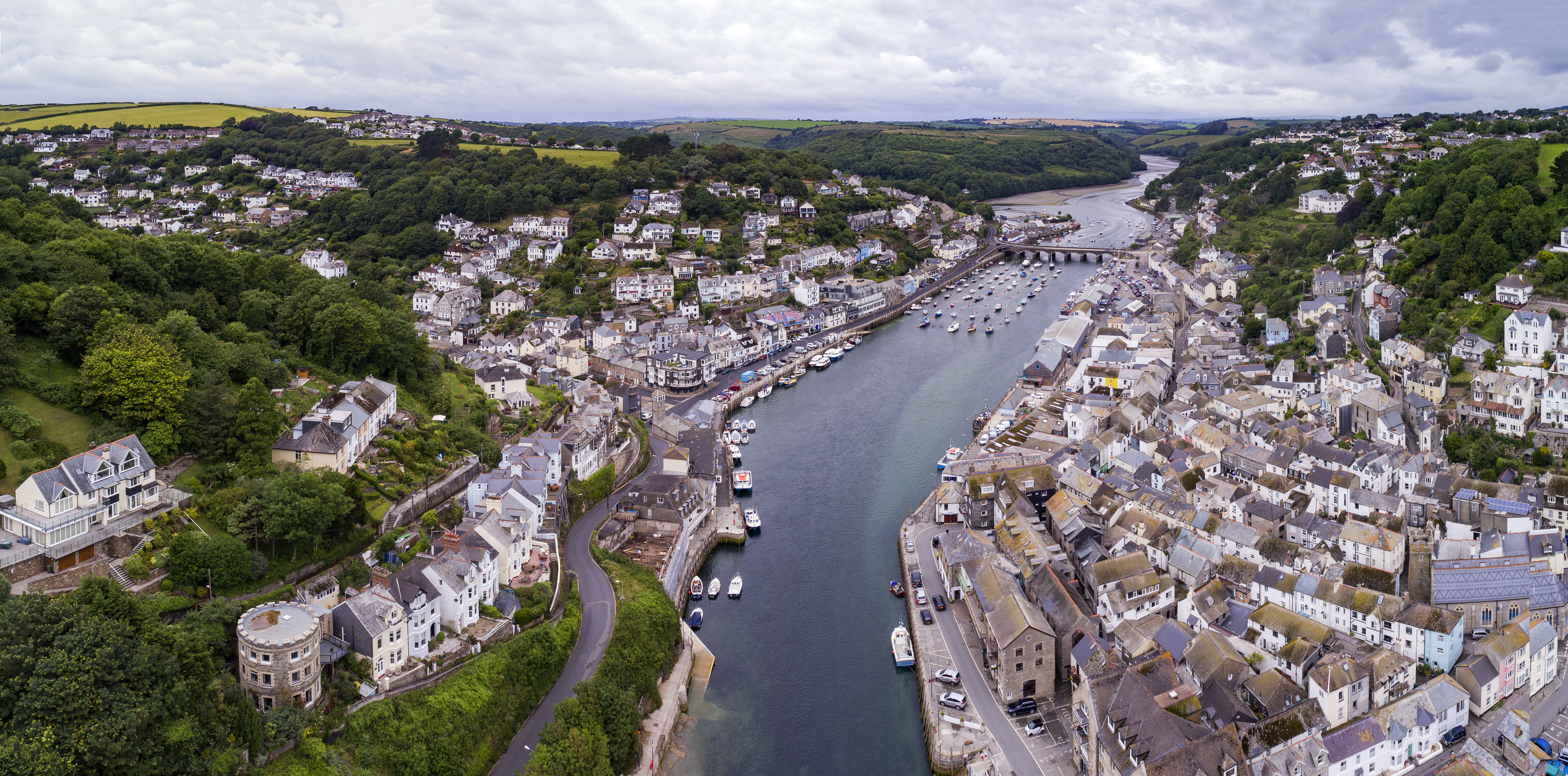

- Location within Cornwall
- Population: 5,311 (Parish, 2021)
- OS grid reference: SX254533
- Civil parish: Looe
- Unitary authority: Cornwall
- Ceremonial county: Cornwall
- Region: South West
- Country: England
- Sovereign state: United Kingdom
- Post town: LOOE
- Postcode district: PL13
- Dialling code: 01503
- Police: Devon and Cornwall
- Fire: Cornwall
- Ambulance: South Western
- UK Parliament: South East Cornwall

Looe (/ˈluː/; Cornish: Logh [lɔx], lit. 'deep water inlet') is a coastal town and civil parish in south-east Cornwall, England, United Kingdom. It lies 20 miles (32 km) west of Plymouth and 7 miles (11 km) south of Liskeard. At the 2021 census the parish had a population of 5,311.

Looe developed as the two separate towns of East Looe (Cornish: Logh) and West Looe (Cornish: Porthbyghan, lit. "little cove") on opposite sides of the River Looe. The two towns were linked by Looe Bridge from the 15th century, but remained separate boroughs until the 19th century. They were administratively united in 1898.

The town is centred on a small harbour and extends along the steep-sided valley of the River Looe, which flows between East and West Looe to the sea beside a sandy beach. Offshore to the west, opposite the stonier Hannafore Beach, lies Looe Island.

== History ==
=== Prehistory and foundation ===
Archaeological evidence indicates that the area around Looe has been inhabited since the Neolithic period, although a possible series of ancient field systems, south of nearby Penarthtown, could suggest earlier Palaeolithic activity. A Neolithic stone axe, made of greenstone, was found in 1978 on a tidal gravel bank in the bed of West Looe River. Further Neolithic finds, such as flint arrow heads, have also been found in the fields above Trenant Point. A large Bronze Age tumulus, which was likely also used as the site for a post-medieval beacon, was located in a field just north of Hillcrest Nursing home in East Looe. Some time after 1823 the site was levelled. Other tumuli are also recorded as having previously existed in the area, such as at Wooldown field, and at the base of Shutta hill. Throughout the Looe area, there are also numerous Iron Age and Romano-British forts. These include the nearby forts/settlements near Trelawne and Great Tree.

Archaeological evidence suggests there was some small-scale Roman influence and possible occupation in Looe. A probable Roman urn was found in 1840 whilst building a new road up the hill to St Martins. The urn was brown, about 10 inches (25 cm) high, and contained several burnt human bone fragments. Pieces of a Roman amphorae, stone boat anchors, Roman coins and a number of late prehistoric or Romano-British finds have been made in the vicinity of nearby Looe Island. A large bronze ingot was found by divers to the south of the island. This has led to a number of historians to suggest that the island could possibly be Ictis, the tin trading island seen by Pytheas in the 4th century BC and recalled by Diodorus Siculus in the 1st century BC. A small hoard of eight late Roman coins, dating to the late 3rd or early 4th century AD, was recovered in 2008 from shallow ditches forming a 'pear-shaped enclosure' which encompassed the top of Looe Island and the later Christian chapel site.

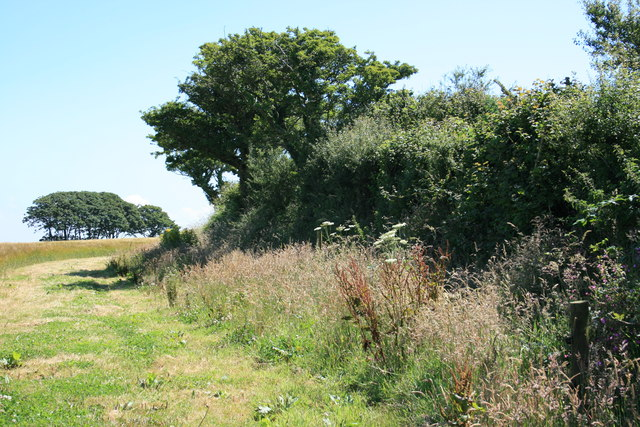
Image of part of the Giant's Hedge, taken near Lanreath

The 'Giant's Hedge' is an ancient earthwork which runs over 15 kilometres (9 miles) westwards from Looe to the Fowey estuary. In some places it is still twelve feet high, and where it is best preserved (for example, in Willake Wood) it is stone-faced and flanked by a ditch. Over the years, there have been many theories to what the ancient earthwork may have been or its intended purpose. The name recalls early folklore that it was built by a giant. A local rhyme goes "One day, the Devil having nothing to do, built a great hedge from Lerryn to Looe". The 19th-century antiquarian William Borlase believed it to be a Roman road, and there have been Roman finds in the area, but the general consensus of modern historians is that this linear earthwork marked a post-Roman territorial boundary.

At the time of the Domesday Book in 1086 the manor of Pendrym, which included much of the site of modern-day East Looe, was still held by William the Conqueror, as part of his own demesne, which he later devolved to the Bodgrugan (Bodrigan) family. Land across the river belonged to the manors of Portalla (or Portallant) and Portbyhan (variously spelt Portbyan, Porthbyghan, Porthpyghan, among others).

Shutta, on the steep hillside over East Looe, is recorded as being inhabited by the 12th century. East Looe's layout looks like a "planted borough", a concept similar to modern new towns, since most of its streets form a grid-like pattern.

Low-lying parts of Looe continue to suffer frequent flooding when the tides are very high. For practical reasons, most fishermen's houses in ancient Looe, like elsewhere along the south coast, were constructed with their living quarters upstairs and a storage area at ground level below: for boats, tools and fishing tackle, etc; these are termed "fishermen's cellars".

=== Early churches ===
Some time before 1144, the Order of Saint Benedict occupied Looe Island, building a chapel there, and the monks established a rudimentary lighthouse service using beacons. Another chapel was founded on an opposite hillside just outside West Looe; both are now marked only by ruins.

The parish church of East Looe was at St Martin by Looe but there was a chapel of ease in the town. St Mary's Church, East Looe was dedicated in 1259 by Walter Bronscombe, Bishop of Exeter. The church was largely rebuilt in 1806 and again in 1882, with the oldest surviving part being the 15th-century tower. The church closed in the 1980s and the building has now been converted to residential use. On the centre of the bridge in medieval times stood the Chapel of St Anne, dedicated in 1436.

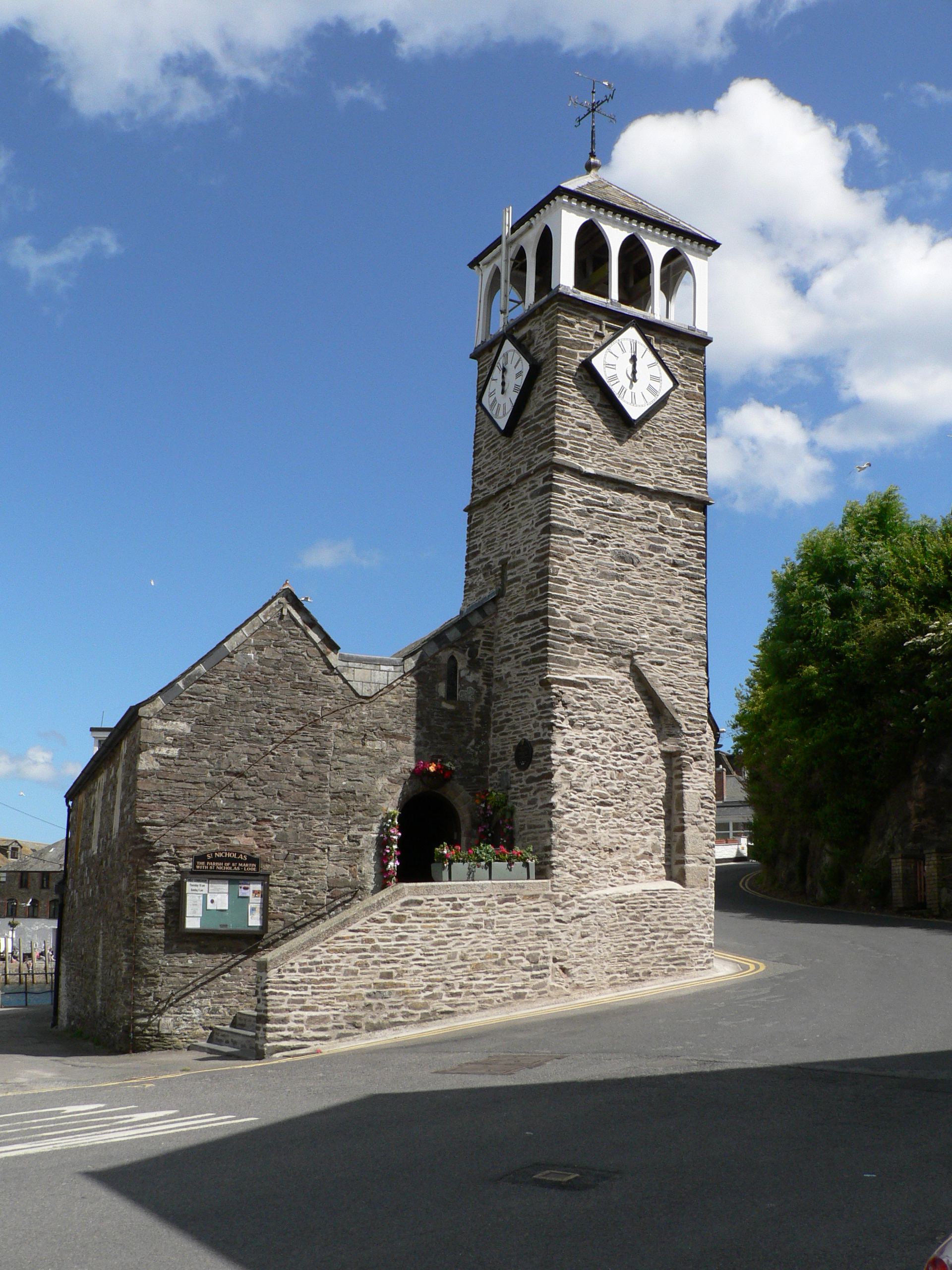
St Nicholas' Church, West Looe

West Looe comprised part of the parish of Talland since the early Middle Ages, but a chapel of ease, St Nicholas' Church, West Looe was extant before 1330 when it is recorded as being further endowed and enlarged. After spells as a common hall and a schoolhouse, this building has reverted to its original ecclesiastical use, having been substantially restored in 1852, 1862 and 1915.

=== Medieval era ===
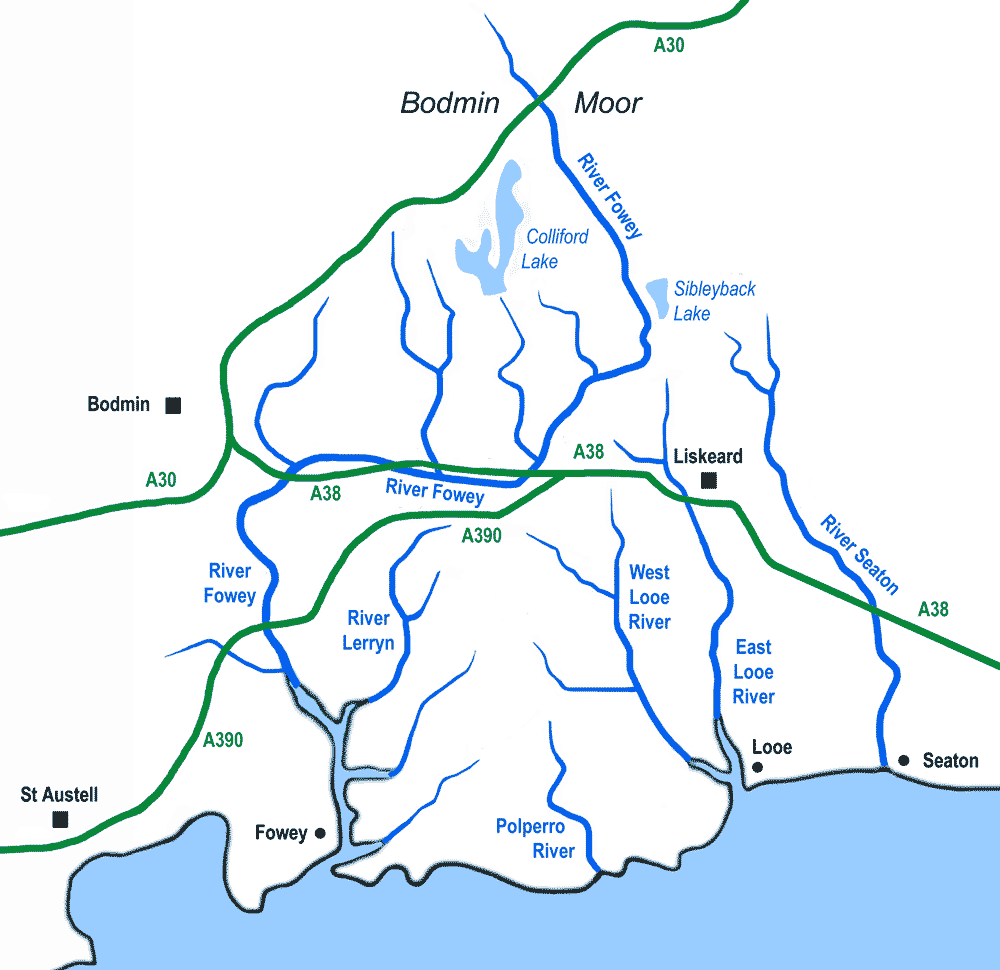
Sketchmap of the East and West Looe Rivers

The town was able to provide some 20 ships for the Siege of Calais in 1347.

An early wooden bridge over the Looe River was in place by 1411; but it burned down and was replaced by the first stone bridge, completed in 1436. This featured a chapel dedicated to St Anne in the middle. The current bridge, a seven-arched Victorian bridge, was opened in 1853. By that time Looe had become a major port, one of Cornwall's largest, exporting local tin, arsenic and granite, as well as hosting thriving fishing and boatbuilding industries.

In the Middle Ages and Tudor era, Looe was a busy port. The textile industry was also an important part of the town's economy, in addition to the traditional boatbuilding and fishing (particularly pilchards and crabs). Trade and transport to and from thriving Newfoundland also contributed to the town's success. The Old Guildhall in East Looe is believed to have dated from around 1450.

=== 17th century ===
In June 1625, the fishing port of Looe was raided by Barbary pirates who streamed into the cobbled streets and forced their way into cottages and taverns. Much to their fury, they discovered that the villagers had been forewarned of their arrival and many had fled into the surrounding orchards and meadows to escape. The pirates still managed to seize eighty mariners and fishermen. Those individuals were led away in chains to North Africa to be enslaved, and the town itself was torched.

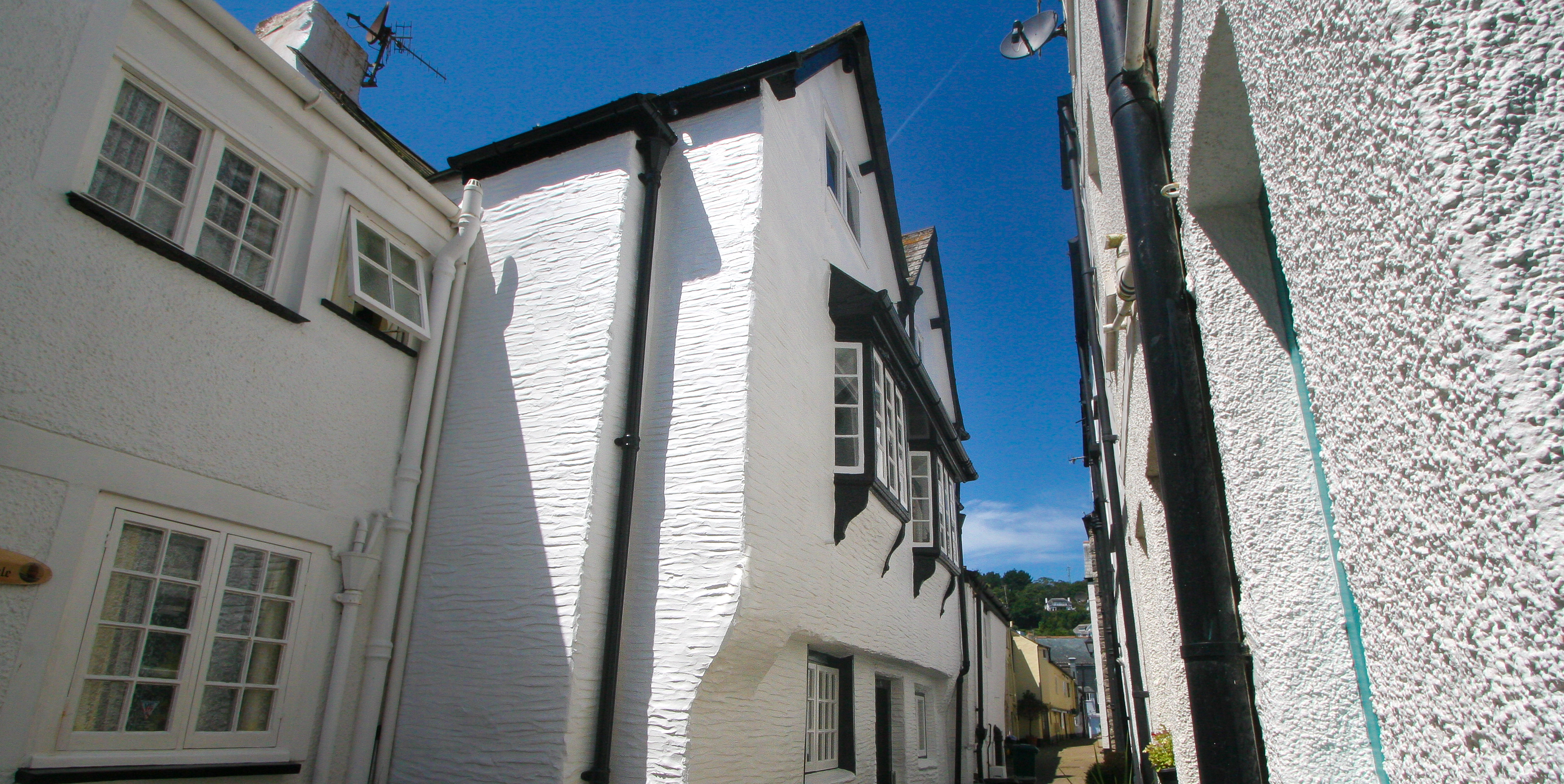
Example of Elizabethan house in East Looe

=== 19th century ===
By the start of the 1800s, Looe's fortunes were in decline. The Napoleonic Wars had taken their toll on the country; in 1803, the town formed a volunteer company to man guns in defence against attack from the French. The blockade of 1808, which prevented the Looe fleet from reaching their pilchard-fishing areas, also put considerable financial strain on the community. In 1805, the old St. Mary's Chapel (apart from the tower) had to be demolished due to dilapidation, and in 1817, the town was badly damaged by heavy storms and flooding.

With the building of the Liskeard and Looe Union Canal linking Looe to Liskeard in 1828, and the development of booming copper mines in the Caradon area from 1837, Looe's fortunes began to revive. The Herodsfoot mine produced 13,470 tons of lead between 1848 and 1884 and more than 17 tons of silver between 1853 and 1884. The canal was used first to transport lime from Wales for use in Cornish farming, and later to carry copper and granite between the railhead at Liskeard (from where rail links reached to the Cheesewring on Bodmin Moor) and the port of Looe. In 1856 the large quay of East Looe was built to handle the demands of the shipping trade, and in 1860, with the canal unable to keep up with demand, a railway was built linking Looe to Moorswater near Liskeard, along the towpath of the canal, which was used less and less until, by 1910, traffic ceased entirely. The railway was later linked to Liskeard proper, and as the mining boom came to an end, it adapted to carry passengers in 1879.

In 1866, a lifeboat station had been established on East Looe Beach, and in 1877 a new town hall was built: the new Looe Guildhall.

=== 20th century and beyond ===
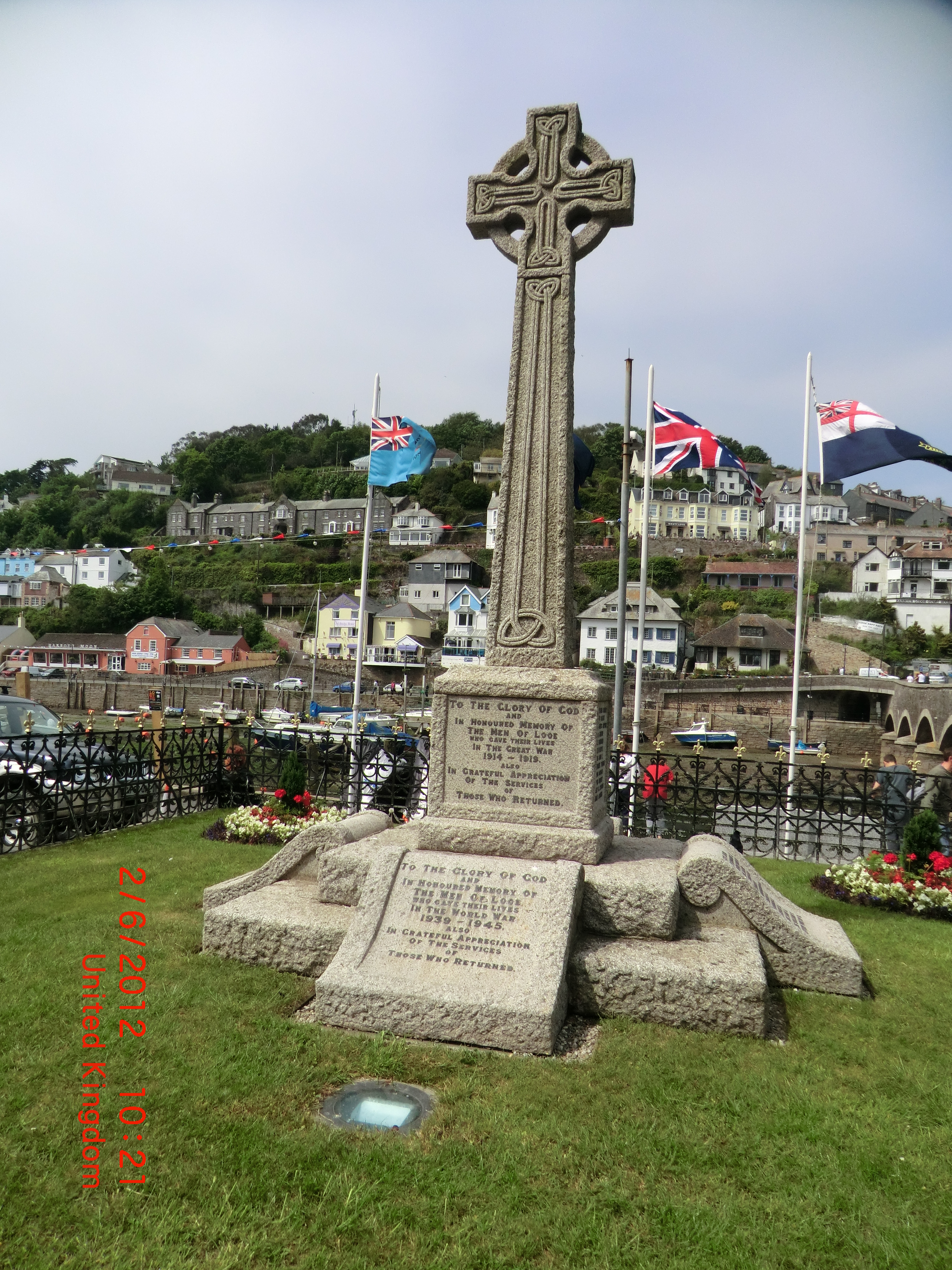
The war memorial

Burgee of Looe Sailing Club, established in 1934

With the Victorian fashion for seaside holidays, Looe evolved as a tourist town, with nearby Talland Bay being dubbed "the playground of Plymouth". This trend continued throughout the 20th century; more and more hotels and tourist facilities were built in the town, and Looe grew and prospered, with peaks in fishing and boatbuilding following the First and Second World Wars.

New Zealand writer Katherine Mansfield stayed in Looe for spring and summer 1918, while recovering from tuberculosis. She joined there her long-time friend the American painter Anne Estelle Rice, who famously painted her in red. The Portrait of Katherine Mansfield made in Looe has been exhibited since 1946 in the Te Papa Tongarewa museum of New Zealand.

Looe and its surrounds are the filming location of BBC television crime drama Beyond Paradise, which first aired in 2023. It stands in for the fictional Devon town of Shipton Abbott.

== Looe today ==
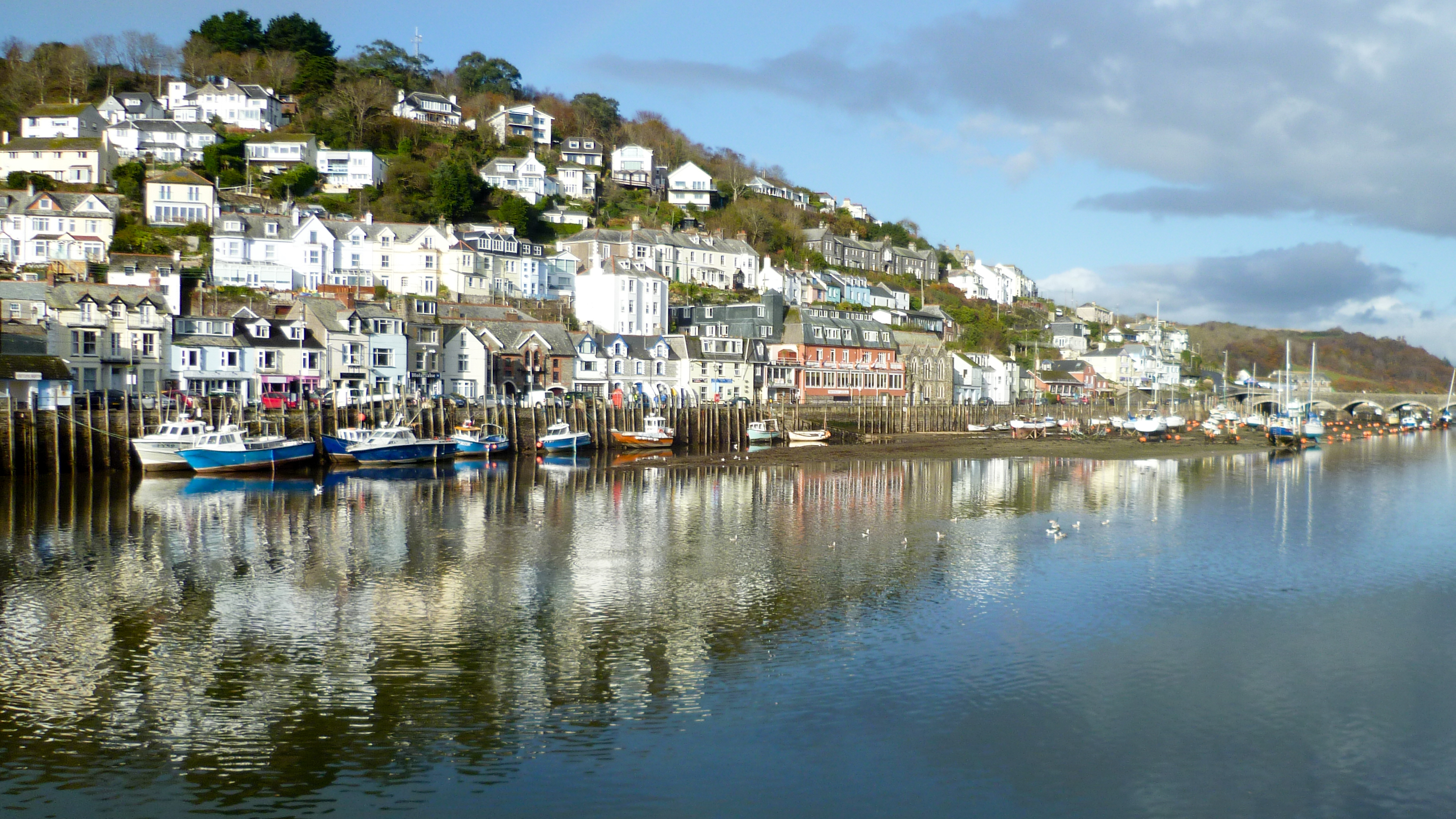
West Looe viewed across the river from East Looe

Looe remains a fishing town, and retained several fish dealers operating from the East Looe quayside until the advent of EU regulations. With its fleet of small fishing boats returning their catches to port daily, Looe has a reputation for procuring excellent fresh fish. The town is also a centre for shark fishing, and is home to the Shark Angling Club of Great Britain.

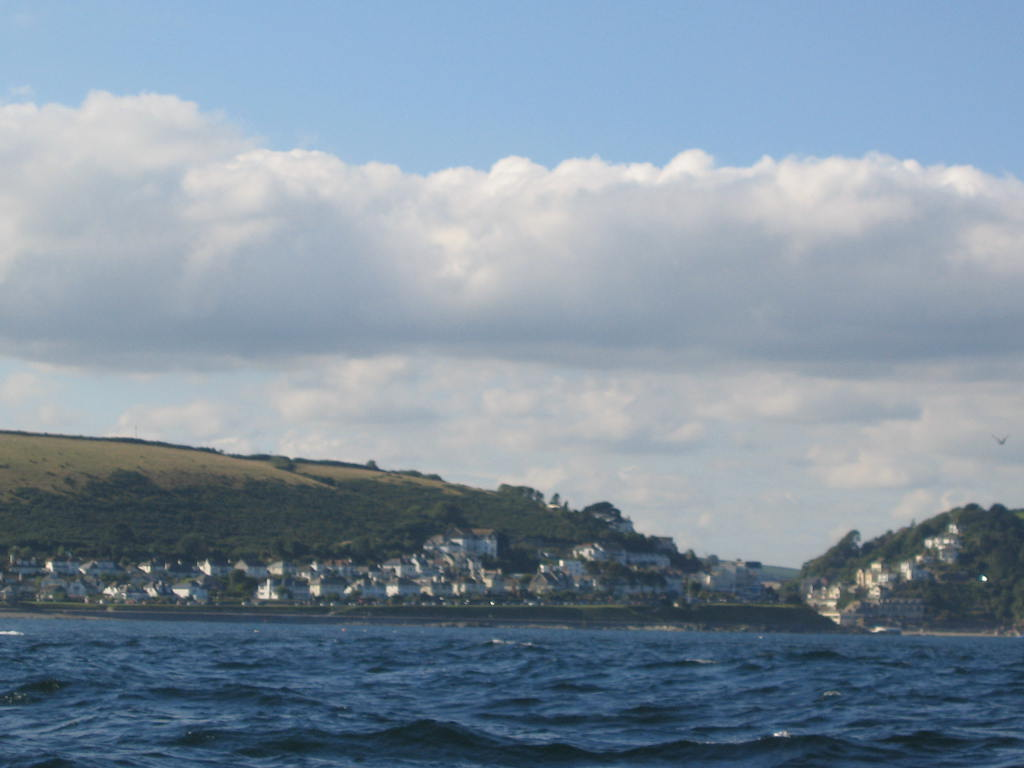
View towards Looe, taken from near Looe Island

Nonetheless, Looe's main business today is tourism, with much of the town given over to hotels, guest houses and holiday homes, along with a large number of pubs, restaurants and beach equipment, ice cream and Cornish pasty vendors. Inland from Looe lie many camping and caravan sites, as well as the famous Woolly Monkey Sanctuary. Other local attractions include the beaches, sailing, fishing and diving, and spectacular coastal walks (especially via Talland to Polperro). South East Cornwall boasts several stately homes, including Antony House, Cotehele, Mount Edgcumbe and Lanhydrock House, as well as the Eden Project near St Austell which tourists can access by road.

Outside the busy summer months, the town remains a centre for shopping and entertainment for local villagers. Annually in late September, the town is the destination of choice for thousands of music lovers and top name performers for the Looe Music Festival, which takes place in temporary venues around the town, harbour and on East Looe beach.

There is a tradition of the townsfolk wearing fancy dress on New Year's Eve, when the streets are thronged with revellers in inventive outfits. Looe has been on the list of the top ten places in the UK to celebrate New Year, and ranked third on the list for 2007–08. Looe is regenerating itself, like many other ports, to serve as a small cargo port. On the high ground north of East and West Looe there are many modern houses and a recreational area called 'the Downs'.

=== East Looe ===
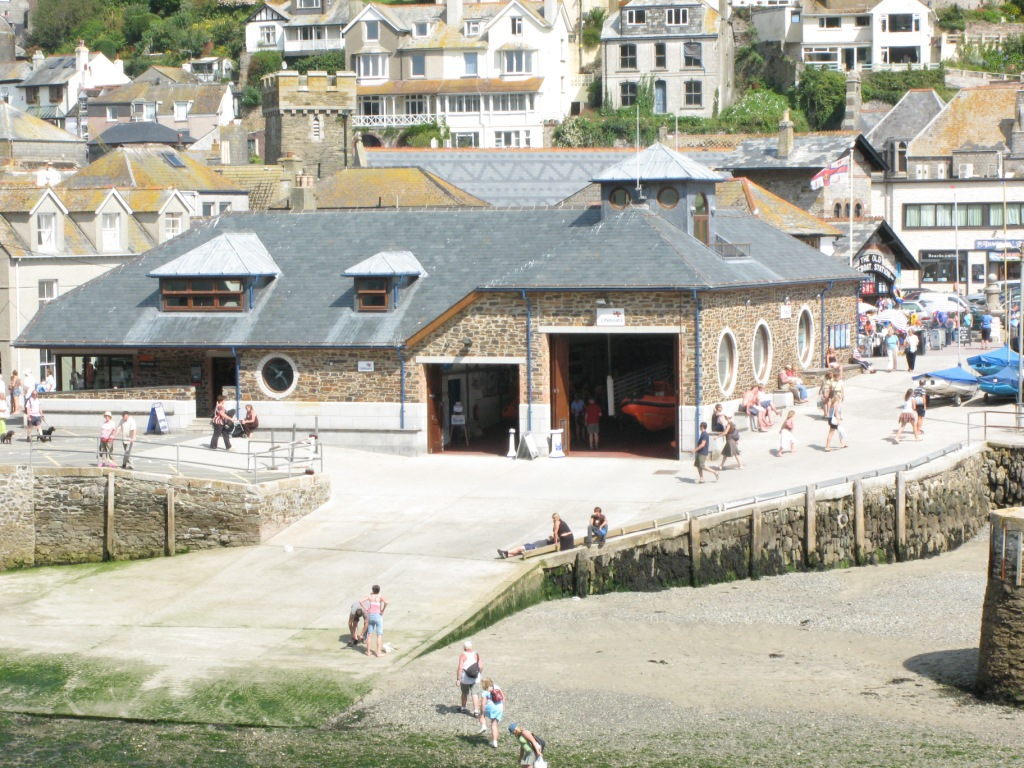
Looe RNLI Lifeboat Station

East Looe centres on its broad sandy beach, with the distinctive Banjo Pier designed by Joseph Thomas, a new lifeboat station and St Mary's Church. Stretching back from the church is a grid of narrow streets forming the main business area of the town, packed with many small shops, restaurants and pubs and the Old Guildhall, now a museum. Along the estuary lies the quay with its fish merchants. Towards Looe Bridge lies the Victorian Guildhall, and just north of the bridge the railway station. This is the terminus of the Looe Valley branch line to Liskeard, where it connects to the Great Western Main Line and services to London Paddington.

On the hilltop above East Looe lies Shutta, and beyond that the Sunrising housing estate and Looe Community Academy. Along the cliffs to the east is Plaidy Beach, and further on the bay and village of Millendreath.

It is covered by the Looe East division of Cornwall Council.

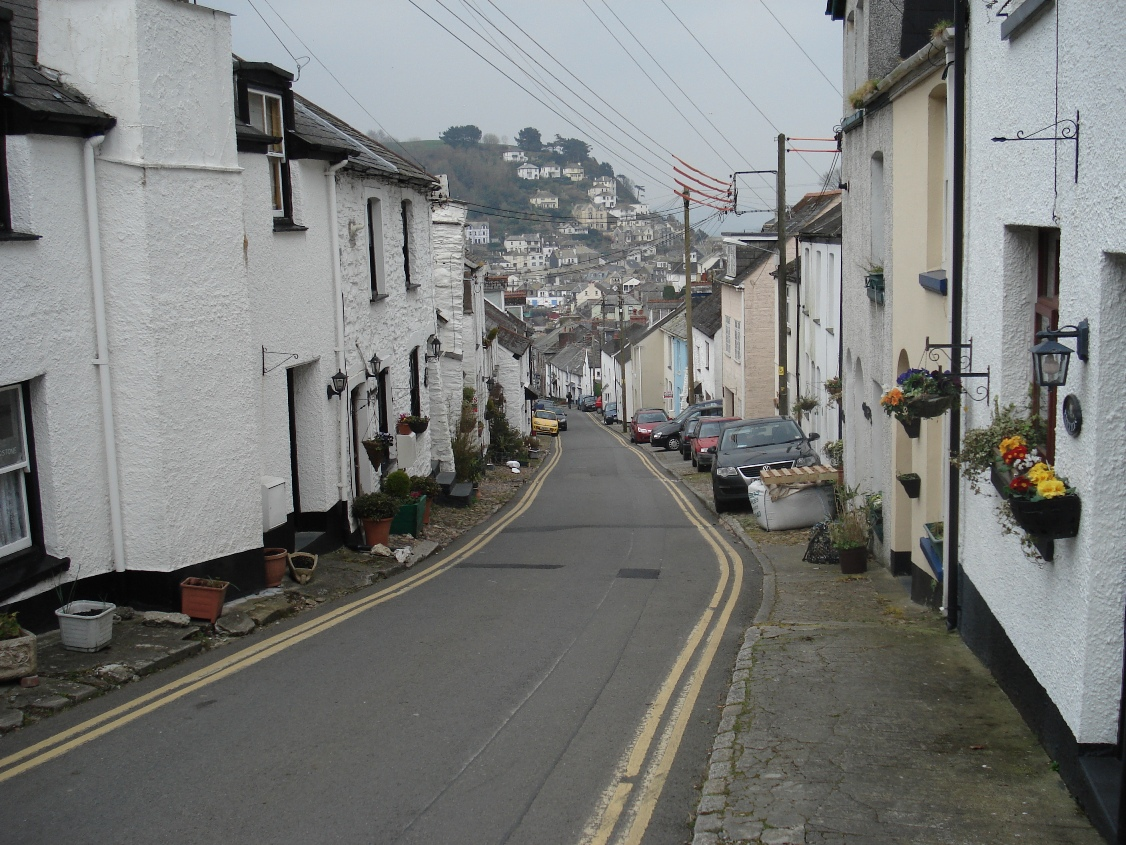
View down West Looe Hill, looking towards the harbour

=== West Looe ===
West Looe spreads west from the bridge on the Polperro Road towards Sclerder, and along the river south of the bridge, with hotels, restaurants and boarding houses along the waterfront and houses climbing the perilous cliff above, towards a cluster of shops and businesses and the Church of St. Nicholas.

West Looe rises onto the Downs, a public recreation ground, well known for local dog walkers. Beyond this is West Looe cemetery, as well as Porthbythan Road, Goonwartha Road and Tregarrick.

Further south along the coast road is Hannafore Point, marking the edge of Looe Harbour, with to the west the wide, stony Hannafore Beach, facing across a narrow channel to Looe Island. Beyond lies the coastal path leading to Portnadler Bay, Talland and Porthallow, and then onward to Polperro. Two towers mark one end of a nautical measured mile, the other end is marked by two towers near Talland Bay.

It is part of the Looe West, Lansallos and Lanteglos division of Cornwall Council.

== Governance ==
There are two tiers of local government covering Looe, at parish (town) and unitary authority level: Looe Town Council and Cornwall Council. The town council is based at the Community Hub on the Millpool in West Looe, which forms part of the same building as the town's library.

=== Administrative history ===
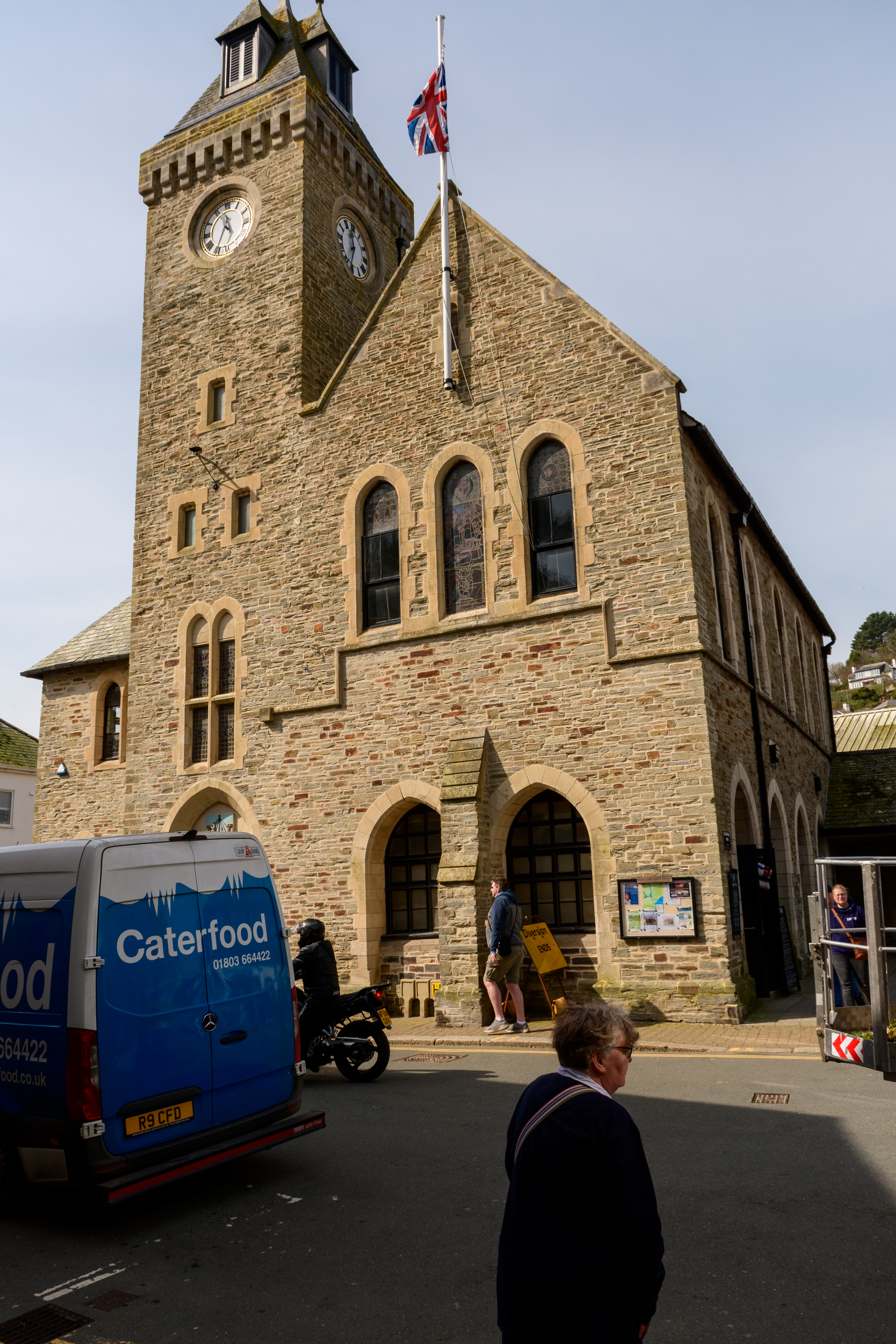
Looe Guildhall in Fore Street: Built 1877 for the old borough of East Looe, subsequently served as headquarters of Looe Urban District Council 1898–1974

The Looe area historically straddled the ancient parishes of Talland west of the river, and St Martin (often called St Martin-by-Looe to distinguish it from other parishes of the same name) east of the river. (Note: The legal name of the St Martin civil parish was eventually changed to St Martin-by-Looe in 1996.) Both parishes formed part of the West Wivelshire hundred of Cornwall.

West Looe's earliest known borough charter was issued by Richard, Earl of Cornwall. The charter is undated; it must date from after 1225 when Richard was made Earl of Cornwall, and appears to have been issued before 1257 when Richard also took on the title of King of the Romans. East Looe gained the right to hold a market by 1189 and was taxed as a borough from 1306. It was granted its first charter in 1320 by Otto Bodrugan as lord of the manor. The seal of East Looe was blazoned An antique one-mast vessel in it a man and boy against the side of the hulk three escutcheons each charges with three bends, with the legend "Si, comunetatis de Loo". The seal of West Looe was An armed man holding a bow in his right hand and an arrow in his left, with the legend "Por-tu-an vel Wys Westlo".

West Looe was made a constituency for parliamentary elections in 1547 as the West Looe parliamentary borough. East Looe similarly became a constituency in 1571 as the East Looe parliamentary borough. Both constituencies came to be viewed as rotten boroughs and were abolished by the Reform Act 1832. A government survey of boroughs in 1835 found that the borough corporations for both East Looe and West Looe had few functions left after the abolition of the constituencies; East Looe ran a few lower-tier courts, but in both cases the main function of the borough corporations prior to 1832 had come to be managing parliamentary elections.

From the 17th century onwards, parishes were gradually given various civil functions under the poor laws, in addition to their original ecclesiastical functions. In some cases, the civil functions were exercised by subdivisions of the parish rather than the parish as a whole. Poor law functions were administered separately for the borough of West Looe and the rest of the parish of Talland, and likewise for the borough of East Looe and the rest of the parish of St Martin. In 1866 the legal definition of 'parish' was changed to be the areas used for administering the poor laws, and so West Looe and East Looe both became separate civil parishes.

West Looe's borough corporation went into terminal decline after the abolition of the constituency in 1832. As the members of the corporation died or resigned they were not replaced, until eventually the corporation consisted of one man, Nathaniel Hearle. He then took the title of mayor until his death in 1869. With no one left on the corporation after his death, the corporation's remaining rights and property passed to the Duchy of Cornwall as lord of the manor.

East Looe's borough corporation continued to operate until 1886, although some of the courts that it was entitled to hold under its charters were in practice discontinued, with their cases passing to the county courts. East Looe was never reformed to become a municipal borough, which would have allowed it to take on more modern local government functions. Such unreformed boroughs were eventually abolished in 1886.

When elected parish and district councils were established under the Local Government Act 1894, East Looe and West Looe were initially both given parish councils and included in the Liskeard Rural District. Shortly afterwards, it was decided to create a new urban district called Looe, covering both East Looe and West Looe, which came into effect in 1898. Looe Urban District Council took over Looe Guildhall to serve as its headquarters. The urban district was enlarged in 1934 to take in areas from both the neighbouring parishes of Talland and St Martin, including the parish church and adjoining settlement of St Martin from the latter.

Looe Urban District was abolished in 1974 under the Local Government Act 1972, when the area became part of the new Caradon district. A successor parish called Looe was created at the same time covering the area of the abolished urban district, with its parish council taking the name Looe Town Council.

Caradon was in turn abolished in 2009. Cornwall County Council then took on district-level functions, making it a unitary authority, and was renamed Cornwall Council.

== Cornish wrestling ==
There have been Cornish wrestling tournaments, for prizes, held in Looe (both East Looe and West Looe) for centuries. Venues for tournaments have included: the field at Barbican Farm, the field adjoining the Old Barbican, Looe Beach and West Looe Down.

== Transport ==
Buses are run by Go Cornwall Bus.

Looe Railway Station has trains run by Great Western Railway to Liskeard operating on an hourly frequency.

== Twinning ==
Looe is twinned with Quiberon (Breton: Kiberen) in Brittany, France.

== Notable people ==
- John Mayow (1641–1679), chemist, physician, and physiologist, researched air & breathing, called pneumatic chemistry.
- Sir Harry Trelawny, 7th Baronet (1756–1834), an English Protestant preacher and convert to Roman Catholicism.
- Thomas Bond (1765–1837), topographer, helped discover fossils in Cornwall.
- William Pengelly (1812–1894), a geologist and amateur archaeologist.

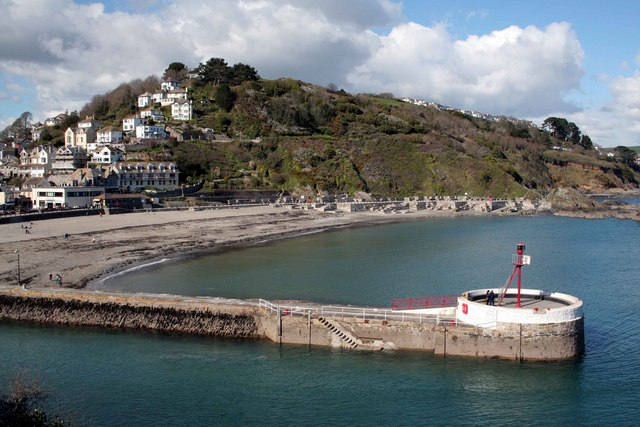
Banjo Pier, Looe, designed by Joseph Thomas

- George Rundle Prynne (1818–1903), an Anglo-Catholic cleric with Tractarian and ritualist views.
- Joseph Thomas (1838–1901), architect and civil engineer, designed the Banjo Pier and created the Hannafore estate.
- Ray Bowden (1909–1998), footballer who played over 330 games including 6 for England
- Anna Palk (1941–1990), an actress, portrayed Sarah Courtney in The Main Chance (21 episodes, 1969–72)
- Richie Reynolds (born 1948), footballer who played over 270 games mainly for Plymouth Argyle & Portsmouth
- Leon Ockenden (born 1978), actor, director and writer, portrayed Norman Jayden in Heavy Rain.
- Neil Warnock (born 1948), football manager, lives in the village.
