= River Looe =

River in south-east Cornwall, England

River Looe East Looe River, West Looe River
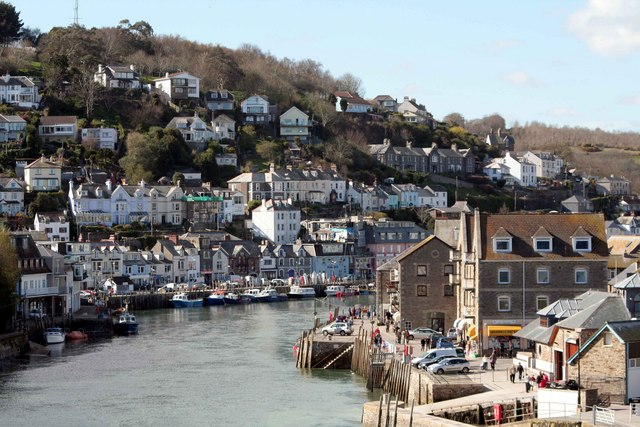
- River Looe in Looe

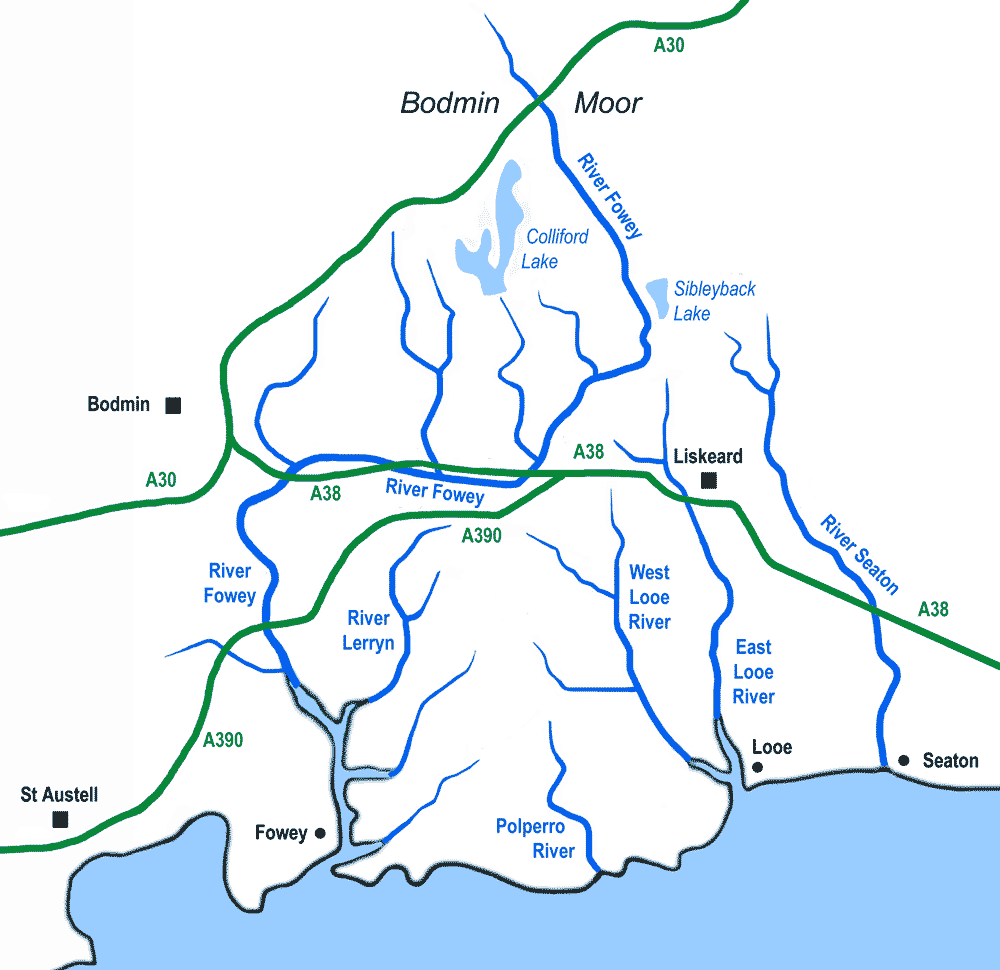
- Sketchmap of the East Looe and West Looe rivers in Cornwall

Location
- Country: England
- State: Cornwall

Physical characteristics
- Length: 30.48 mi (49.05 km)
- Basin size: 36.3 sq mi (94 km^{2})

The River Looe (Cornish: Logh, meaning deep water inlet) is a river in south-east Cornwall, which flows into the English Channel at Looe. It has two main branches, the East Looe River and the West Looe River. The eastern branch has its source near St Cleer only 0.31 miles (0.5 km) away from the Golitha Falls on the River Fowey, and flows south, passing close to the western outskirts of Liskeard. The western branch has its source near Dobwalls.

== Route ==
South of Liskeard, the Looe Valley Line railway follows the course of the East Looe River to Looe. The railway is so close to the river that flooding is a common occurrence.

The lowest stretch of the rivers combine to form the tidal harbour and estuary of Looe. The combined length of the two rivers (including the tidal confluence) is 30.48 miles (49.05 km).

The river is tidal to Watergate on the West Looe and Sandplace on the East Looe. After Sandplace, the river was connected to the Liskeard and Looe Union Canal so that minerals and stone could be transported from the workings and quarries above Liskeard to the harbour at Looe. The tidal estuarine section is an example of a ria (a drowned river valley) and at low tide, the rivers almost dry up to a very small natural level.

== See also ==
- Rivers of the United Kingdom
