= Looe East and Deviock (electoral division) =

Electoral division of Cornwall in the UK

- ward Cornwall Council
- Boundary of Looe East and Deviock in Cornwall from 2021.
- County: Cornwall

Current ward
- Created: 2021
- Councillor: Armand Toms (Independent)
- Number of councillors: One
- Created from: Menheniot; Trelawny

Looe East and Deviock is an electoral division of Cornwall in the United Kingdom which returns one member to sit on Cornwall Council. It was created at the 2021 local elections, being created from the former divisions of Menheniot, and Trelawny. The current councillor is Armand Toms, an independent.

== Boundaries ==
Looe East and Deviock represents the parishes of Deviock, the eastern half of Looe, Morval, St Keyne and Trewidland, and St Martin-By-Looe.

The parish of Deviock includes the villages and hamlets of Deviock, Downderry, Hessenford, Narkurs, Seaton, and Trelowia.

The parish of Looe includes the eastern portion of the town of Looe, and the hamlets of Barbican, Shutta, and St Martin.

The parish of Morval includes the hamlets of Morval, Sandplace, Torwell, Widegates, and Wringworthy.

The parish of St Keyne and Trewidland includes the hamlets of Horningtops and Trewidland.

The parish of St Martin-By-Looe includes the hamlets of Hillendreath and No Man's Land.

== Councillors ==
Election	Member	Party
2021	Armand Toms	Independent

== Election results ==
=== 2021 election ===
2021 Cornwall Council election: Looe East and Deviock
Party	Candidate	Votes	%	±%
Independent	Armand Toms (Note: Incumbent councillor, formerly representing Looe East)	1,345	72.0	N/A
Liberal Democrats	Marian Candy	236	12.6	N/A
Green	Kevin Mattholie	147	7.9	N/A
Labour	Avril Young	141	7.5	N/A
Majority		1,109	59.3	N/A
Rejected ballots		21	1.1	N/A
Turnout		1,890	40	N/A
Independent win (new seat)				
