= Trelawny (electoral division) =

Former electoral division of Cornwall in the UK

- Former ward Cornwall Council
- Boundary of Trelawny in Cornwall from 2013-2021.
- County: Cornwall

2013–2021
- Number of councillors: One
- Replaced by: Lostwithiel and Lanreath; Looe West, Pelynt, Lansallos and Lanteglos; Liskeard South and Dobwalls; Looe East and Deviock
- Created from: Pelynt
- Number of councillors: One

Trelawny (Cornish: Trelawny) was an electoral division of Cornwall in the United Kingdom which returned one member to sit on Cornwall Council between 2013 and 2021. It was abolished at the 2021 local elections, being split into four new divisions: Lostwithiel and Lanreath; Looe West, Pelynt, Lansallos and Lanteglos; Liskeard South and Dobwalls; and Looe East and Deviock.

== Councillors ==
Election	Member	Party
2013	Jim Candy	Liberal Democrat
2017	Richard Pugh	Conservative
2021	Seat abolished	

== Extent ==
Trelawny represented the villages of Lanreath, Pelynt, Duloe, Sandplace, Widegates, Hessenford, Seaton and Downderry, and the hamlets of Muchlarnick, Trelawne, Churchbridge, Tredinnick, Tregarland, Morval, Torwell, Wringworthy, Trelowia, Deviock and Narkurs. The village of Herodsfoot was shared with the Menheniot division and the hamlet of No Man's Land was shared with the Looe East division. The division covers 9,745 hectares in total.

== Election results ==
=== 2017 election ===
2017 election: Trelawny
Party	Candidate	Votes	%	±%
Conservative	Richard Pugh	967	49.9	
Liberal Democrats	Jim Candy	955	49.3	
Majority		12	0.6	
Rejected ballots		15	0.8	
Turnout		1937	51.7	
Conservative gain from Liberal Democrats		Swing		

=== 2013 election ===
2013 election: Trelawny
Party	Candidate	Votes	%	±%
Liberal Democrats	Jim Candy	695		
Conservative	Peter Hunt	513		
UKIP	Anthony Marris	392		
Majority		182		
Rejected ballots		14		
Turnout		1614	42.2	
Liberal Democrats win (new seat)				
