= Menheniot (electoral division) =

Electoral division of Cornwall in the UK

- Former ward Cornwall Council
- Boundary of Menheniot in Cornwall from 2013-2021.
- County: Cornwall

2013–2021
- Number of councillors: One
- Replaced by: Lynher; St Cleer and Menheniot; Looe East and Deviock; Liskeard South and Dobwalls
- Created from: Menheniot

2009–2013
- Number of councillors: One
- Replaced by: Menheniot
- Created from: Council created

Menheniot (Cornish: Mahynyet) was an electoral division of Cornwall in the United Kingdom which returned one member to sit on Cornwall Council between 2009 and 2021. It was abolished at the 2021 local elections, being split between the new divisions of Lynher, St Cleer and Menheniot, Looe East and Deviock, and Liskeard South and Dobwalls.

== Councillors ==
Election	Member	Party
2009	Bernie Ellis	Conservative
2013	Bernie Ellis	Conservative
2016 by-election	Phil Seeva	Conservative
2017	Phil Seeva	Conservative
2021	Seat abolished	

== Extent ==
Menheniot represented the villages of East Taphouse, Doublebois, St Keyne, Merrymeet, Menheniot and Quethiock, and the hamlets of Redpost, Treburgie Water, Trevelmond, St Pinnock, Trewidland, Horningtops, Pengover Green, Lower Clicker, Doddycross, Trehunist and Blunts. The village of Herodsfoot was shared with the Trelawny division.

The division was nominally abolished during boundary changes at the 2013 election, but this had little effect on the ward. Both before and after the boundary changes, the division covered 8,644 hectares in total.

== Election results ==
=== 2017 election ===
2017 election: Menheniot
Party	Candidate	Votes	%	±%
Conservative	Phil Seeva	834	53.9	
Liberal Democrats	Charles Boney	701	45.3	
Majority		133	8.6	
Rejected ballots		11	0.7	
Turnout		1546	48.7	
Conservative hold		Swing		

=== 2016 by-election ===
2016 by-election: Menheniot
Party	Candidate	Votes	%	±%
Conservative	Phil Seeva	532	40.5	
Liberal Democrats	Charles Boney	472	35.9	
UKIP	Duncan Odgers	177	13.5	
Labour	Martin Menear	67	5.1	
Green	Richard Sedgley	65	4.9	
Majority		60	4.6	
Rejected ballots		1	0.8	
Turnout		1314	42.4	
Conservative hold		Swing		

=== 2013 election ===
2013 election: Menheniot
Party	Candidate	Votes	%	±%
Conservative	Bernie Ellis	549	37.7	
UKIP	David Clue	450	30.9	
Liberal Democrats	Charles Boney	352	24.1	
Green	Richard Sedgley	93	6.4	
Majority		99	6.8	
Rejected ballots		14	1.0	
Turnout		1458	46.2	
Conservative hold		Swing		

=== 2009 election ===
2009 election: Menheniot
Party	Candidate	Votes	%	±%
Conservative	Bernie Ellis	746	47.1	
Liberal Democrats	Anthony Francis	433	27.4	
UKIP	David Clue	389	24.6	
Majority		313	19.8	
Rejected ballots		15	0.9	
Turnout		1583	50.6	
Conservative win (new seat)				
