= Dobwalls and Trewidland =

Former civil parish in Cornwall, England

Coordinates: 50.457°N 4.515°W

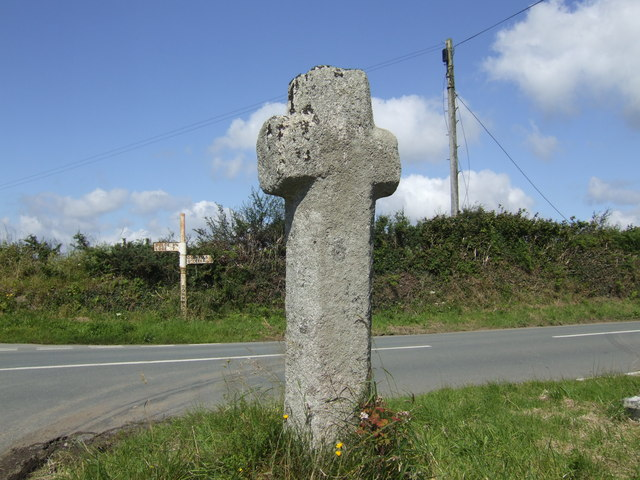
- Bosent cross, on the border with St Pinnock civil parish

- Location within Cornwall
- Population: 2,068 (2011 census)
- Civil parish: Dobwalls; St Keyne and Trewidland
- Unitary authority: Cornwall
- Ceremonial county: Cornwall
- Region: South West
- Country: England
- Sovereign state: United Kingdom

Dobwalls and Trewidland (Cornish: Fos an Mogh & Trewydhlann) was a civil parish in south-east Cornwall, England, United Kingdom between 1974 and 2021.

The parish was bounded to the north by St Neot and St Cleer parishes, to the east by Liskeard and Menheniot parishes, to the south by Morval parish, to the west by the East Looe River and the parishes of St Pinnock and St Keyne, and to the south-west by Duloe parish.

The two largest villages in the parish were Dobwalls and Doublebois, both in the north of the parish. There were several smaller villages in the south of the parish including Trewidland and Horningtops, and the hamlet of Boduel to the north. The hamlets of Coombe, East Tuelmenna, Treburgie and Twelvewoods were also in the parish.

== History ==
The parish had its origins in the ancient parish of Liskeard, which covered the town itself and areas to the south and west of it. The municipal borough of Liskeard covered the town, but large parts of the wider parish of Liskeard were outside the borough boundaries. Under the Local Government Act 1894 parishes could no longer straddle borough boundaries and so the parish was split into two parishes: "Liskeard Borough" covering the part within the borough and "Liskeard" covering the rural parts of the parish, including the hamlets of Dobwalls to the west and Trewidland to the south. In 1974 the borough of Liskeard was abolished under the Local Government Act 1972 and a successor parish called Liskeard created covering the former borough. To avoid having two neighbouring parishes both called Liskeard, the rural parish of Liskeard was renamed "Dobwalls and Trewidland" on 1 April 1974, taking its new name from two of its larger settlements.

The population of Dobwalls and Trewidland parish in the 2001 census was 1,939 including Hendrabridge plus Looe Mills and increasing to 2,068 at the 2011 Census.

In 2020 Cornwall Council announced that from 1 April 2021 the part of Dobwalls and Trewidland parish surrounding the village of Trewidland would be moved to the parish of St Keyne, to form the new parish of St Keyne and Trewidland, with the remaining parish known as Dobwalls.

== Protected areas ==
Rosenun Lane, 1 km north of St Keyne Wishing Well Halt railway station, is a designated Site of Special Scientific Interest noted for its geological characteristics.
