= Liskeard Central (electoral division) =

Electoral division of Cornwall in the UK

- ward Cornwall Council
- Boundary of Liskeard Central in Cornwall from 2021.
- County: Cornwall

Current ward
- Created: 2021
- Councillor: Nick Craker (Conservative)
- Number of councillors: One
- Created from: Liskeard East; Liskeard North

Liskeard Central is an electoral division of Cornwall in the United Kingdom which returns one member to sit on Cornwall Council. It was created at the 2021 local elections, being created from the former divisions of Liskeard East, and Liskeard North. The current councillor is Nick Craker, a Conservative.

== Boundaries ==
Liskeard Central represents most of the parish of Liskeard, with the remainder of the parish being shared with the electoral division of Liskeard South and Dobwalls. This includes the central and eastern portions of the town of Liskeard, and the suburbs of Trembraze and Addington.

== Councillors ==
Election	Member	Party
2021	Nick Craker	Conservative

== Election results ==
=== 2021 election ===
2021 Cornwall Council election: Liskeard Central
Party	Candidate	Votes	%	±%
Conservative	Nick Craker (Note: Incumbent councillor, formerly representing Liskeard North)	858	54.4	N/A
Labour	Kerry Cassidy	407	25.8	N/A
Liberal Democrats	Naomi Taylor	204	12.9	N/A
Green	Samuel Ramsden	107	6.8	N/A
Majority		451	28.6	N/A
Rejected ballots		13	0.8	N/A
Turnout		1,589		N/A
Conservative win (new seat)				
