= Liskeard South and Dobwalls (electoral division) =

Electoral division of Cornwall in the UK

- ward Cornwall Council
- Boundary of Liskeard South and Dobwalls in Cornwall from 2021-present.
- County: Cornwall

Current ward
- Created: 2021
- Councillor: Jane Pascoe (Conservative)
- Number of councillors: One
- Created from: Liskeard West and Dobwalls; Trelawny; Menheniot

2009–2013
- Number of councillors: One
- Replaced by: Liskeard West and Dobwalls
- Created from: Council established

Liskeard South and Dobwalls (Cornish: Lyskerrys Soth ha Fosow Dobb) is an electoral division of Cornwall in the United Kingdom and elects one member to sit on Cornwall Council. The current councillor is Jane Pascoe, a member of the Conservative Party.

Liskeard South and Dobwalls was also the name of a smaller electoral division on Cornwall Council between 2009 and 2013, when it was replaced with Liskeard West and Dobwalls.

== Councillors ==
=== 2009-2013 ===
Election	Member	Party
2009	Mike George	Liberal Democrat
2013	Seat abolished	

=== 2021-present ===
Election	Member	Party
2021	Jane Pascoe	Conservative

== 2021-present division ==
=== Extent ===
The division covers the settlements of East Taphouse, Doublebois, St Pinnock, Dobwalls, Herodsfoot, St Keyne, Duloe, Treninnick, Looe and southwestern Liskeard. It borders St Cleer & Menheniot to the north and east, Liskeard Central and Looe East & Deviock to the east, Looe West, Pelynt, Lansallos & Lanteglos to the south, as well as Lostwithiel & Lanreath to the west.

=== Election results ===
==== 2021 election ====
2021 election: Liskeard South and Dobwalls
Party	Candidate	Votes	%	±%
Conservative	Jane Pascoe	1,442	60.61	New
Liberal Democrats	Jesse Foot	538	22.61	New
Labour	Simon Cassidy	265	11.14	New
Green	Simon Cassidy	134	5.63	New
Majority		904	38.00	
Rejected ballots		15	0.63	
Conservative win (new seat)				

== 2009-2013 division ==
=== Extent ===
The 2009 division was much smaller than the current division. It covered the south west of Liskeard, including the suburb of Moorswater, and the village of Dobwalls. The Liskeard West and Dobwalls division that replaced it was very similar in size.

=== Election results ===
==== 2009 election ====
2009 election: Liskeard South and Dobwalls
Party	Candidate	Votes	%	±%
Liberal Democrats	Mike George	832	56.5	New
Conservative	Sue James-Smith	510	34.6	New
BNP	Alan Cook	115	7.8	New
Majority		322	21.9	
Rejected ballots		16	1.1	
Turnout		1473	44.0	
Registered electors		3,348		
Liberal Democrats win (new seat)				
