= Liskeard West and Dobwalls (electoral division) =

Former electoral division of Cornwall in the UK

- Former ward Cornwall Council
- Boundary of Liskeard West and Dobwalls in Cornwall from 2013-2021.
- County: Cornwall

2013–2021
- Number of councillors: One
- Replaced by: Liskeard South and Dobwalls; Liskeard Central
- Created from: Liskeard South and Dobwalls

Liskeard West and Dobwalls (Cornish: Lyskerrys West ha Fosow Dobb) was an electoral division of Cornwall in the United Kingdom which returned one member to sit on Cornwall Council between 2013 and 2021. It was abolished at the 2021 local elections; most of the division was made into a part of the new, larger Liskeard South and Dobwalls division, but a small piece of land was absorbed into the Liskeard Central division. (Note: The piece of land is the small area in Liskeard Central between the A38 road and the boundary with St Cleer and Menheniot.)

== Councillors ==
Election	Member	Party
2013	Michael George	Liberal Democrat
2017	Jane Pascoe	Conservative
2021	Seat abolished	

== Extent ==
Liskeard West and Dobwalls represented the west of Liskeard, including the suburb of Moorswater, and the village of Dobwalls. The division covered 655 hectares in total.

== Election results ==
=== 2017 election ===
2017 election: Liskeard West and Dobwalls
Party	Candidate	Votes	%	±%
Conservative	Jane Pascoe	738	49.6	New
Liberal Democrats	Michael George	501	33.7	−32.6
Labour	Tyler Bennetts	180	12.1	New
UKIP	Chris Collins	66	4.4	−26.9
Majority		237	15.9	−19.2
Rejected ballots		3	0.2	−2.2
Turnout		1488	44.5	+8.9
Conservative gain from Liberal Democrats		Swing		

=== 2013 election ===
2013 election: Liskeard West and Dobwalls
Party	Candidate	Votes	%	±%
Liberal Democrats	Michael George	796	66.3	New
UKIP	Patricia Marris	375	31.3	New
Majority		421	35.1	
Rejected ballots		29	2.4	
Turnout		1200	35.6	
Liberal Democrats win (new seat)				
