= Deviock =

Civil parish in Cornwall, England

Coordinates: 50.391°N 4.384°W

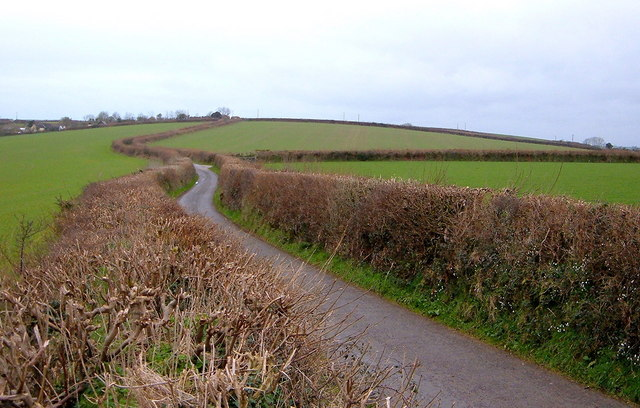
- View towards Narkurs Cross

- Location within Cornwall
- Population: 1,420 (2011 census)
- Civil parish: Deviock
- Unitary authority: Cornwall
- Shire county: Cornwall
- Region: South West
- Country: England
- Sovereign state: United Kingdom
- Police: Devon and Cornwall
- Fire: Cornwall
- Ambulance: South Western

Deviock (Cornish: Devyek) is a coastal civil parish in south-east Cornwall, England. It is situated approximately three miles (5 km) west of St Germans and straddles the valley of the River Seaton. The parish includes the settlements of Hessenford, Seaton and Downderry and the population in the 2001 census was 1341, increasing to 1,420 at the 2011 census. The parish occupies an area of 2,108 hectares (approx 5,000 acres).

The hamlets of Narkurs and Trelowia are also in the parish.

== History ==
The parish history of the St Germans area is complex and has been subject to much change. Two ecclesiastical parishes (Hessenford and Tideford) were created in the 19th century. Deviock civil parish was created as recently as April 1997 from part of the former St Germans Parish; it also includes parts of St Martin-by-Looe and part of Morval.

== Government ==
From 2013 to the 2021 local elections, Deviock was covered by the Trelawny division. From 2021, it will be in the Looe East and Deviock division. Deviock civil parish has three electoral wards:

- Hessenford (139 electors)
- Seaton (249 electors)
- Downderry (719 electors).

== Community ==
There are two Anglican churches in the parish, St Nicolas at Downderry and St Anne's Church, Hessenford (which also has a church hall where the parish council meets). There is a primary school in the parish and two post offices.
