= Keyne =

Welsh saint

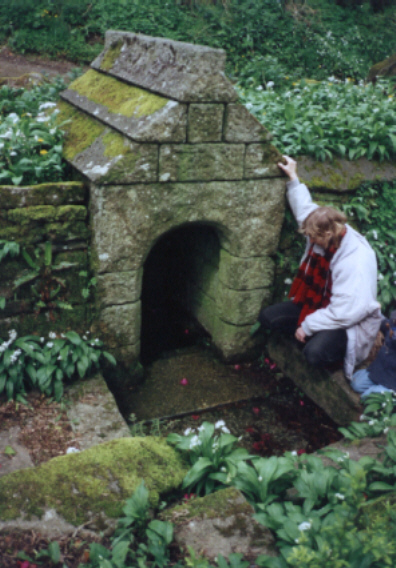
St Keyne's well, Cornwall

Keyne (/keɪn, kiːnə/; also referred to as Keane, Kayane Keyna, Cenau, Cenedion, Ceinwen) was a 5th-century holy woman and hermitess who was said to have travelled widely through what is now South Wales and Cornwall.

== Sources ==
Numerous dedications to Saint Keyne exist in areas as diverse as South Wales, Anglesey, Somerset, Hertfordshire, and Cornwall. The only literary source on the life of Saint Keyne is the Vita Sanctae Keynae, which was edited by John of Tynemouth and included in his Sanctilogium Angliae Walliae Scotiae et Hiberniae in the 14th century. This account is probably not trustworthy, as it was recorded nearly 800 years after her death. No contemporary sources about her or her life have survived.

== Life ==
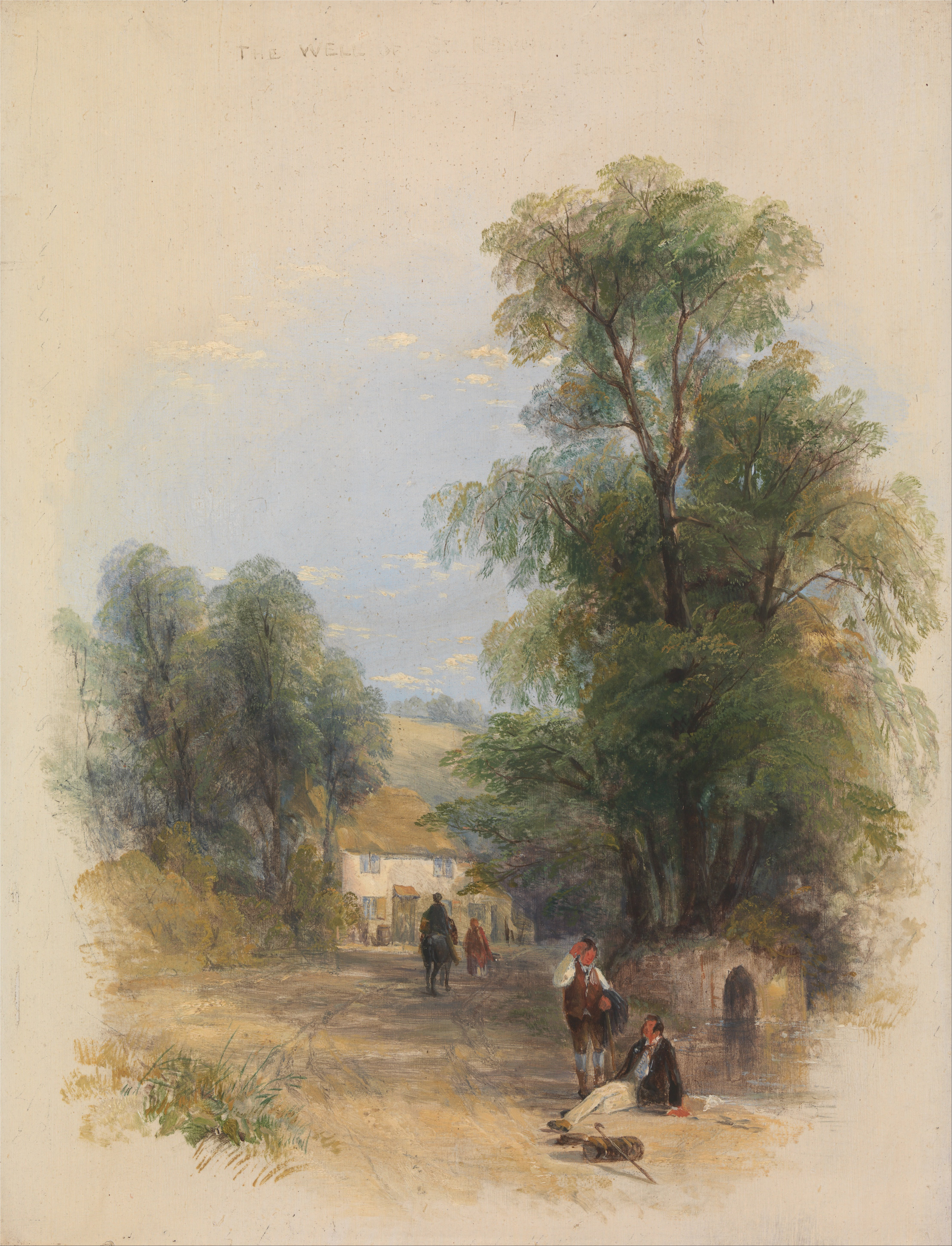
The Well of St Keyne; by Thomas Creswick

Keyne was one of the 12 daughters of the Welsh king Brychan of Brycheiniog in what is now South Wales (A different source, De Situ Brecheniauc, says that he actually had 24 daughters, all of whom were saints.) Although she was a great beauty and received many offers of marriage, Keyne took a vow of virginity and pursued a religious life (hence her Welsh name, Cain Wyry, or Keyne the Maiden).

Her vita reports that she travelled widely, and is said to have founded several oratories, including Llangeinor in mid-Glamorgan, Llangunnor and Llangain in Dyfed, and Rockfield (Llangennon) in Runston, Gwent. Eventually she is said to have crossed the Severn into Cornwall, where she resided as a hermitess for many years. The village of St Keyne in Cornwall is named after her and is the site of a church and a holy well which also take her name.

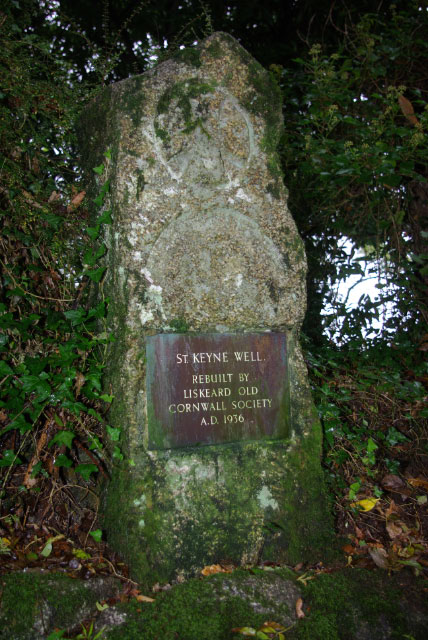
Plaque at St Keyne's well

Around 490, she is alleged to have visited her nephew Saint Cadoc at St Michael's Mount. Cadoc persuaded her to return to Wales, and a healing spring marked the location where she settled and eventually died. She died a virgin on 5 October in either 490 or 505. Llangeinor in Glamorgan has been proposed as a likely spot, as an ancient well is situated there, which is still said to have healing properties.

== Legacy ==
Saint Keyne's feast is celebrated on 8 October, although it is also recorded as 30 September. She was the original patron saint of what is now St Martin-by-Looe (Penndrumm). Popularly, she is linked with the River Kenwyn in Truro, which had been mentioned in Ptolemy's Geography as early as mid-second century AD, three centuries before her life. Her most enduring and romanticized legacy is linked to the holy well that takes its name from her, located in St Keyne, Cornwall. According to legend, whichever partner in a marriage drinks from the well first will have the upper hand in the marriage, and rule over the other. This story was known in the Middle Ages, and was memorialized in Robert Southey's poem "The Well of St Keyne".

Some sources credit her as the patron saint of Keynsham in Somerset, where she is said to have resided near the banks of the Avon, which was swarming with serpents and uninhabitable. After Saint Keyne issued a fervent prayer, the serpents were transformed to stone, and the area became habitable. (Today, these are known to be the fossilized remains of ammonites). However, a similar miracle is also attributed to St Hilda, and it has been suggested that Keynsham instead takes its name from "Ceagin's (Caega) Hamm".

There is a tradition that one of a pair of altars in the Berkeley Chapel in Bristol Cathedral was dedicated to St Keyna.

== Interpretations ==
The Edwardian scholar G.H. Doble found it hard to accept that a woman could have travelled so far or founded so many settlements, and therefore she "quite may well have been a man". He believed that the journeyings were more in character with male saints from this period, a sentiment which was shared by the scholar Alban Butler, who believed a number of female saints had actually been men. This view has been challenged by scholars such as Jane Cartwright, who states that this is indicative of a school of thought in which male saints are much more likely to be real historical figures than female saints, and that maleness alone is greater evidence of historicity than femaleness.

== St Keyne's well ==
The holy well of Saint Keyne is located about 0.8 kilometres (0.5 mi) southeast of St Keyne's Church in Cornwall, and is now in a small housing made of dressed granite. The original housing was built in the 16th century, it was rebuilt in 1936 after the adjoining lane was widened. The plaque next to the well describes the spell which Saint Keyne is said to have cast upon the water of the well. The plaque reads: "The legend of Saint Keyne Well. Saint Keyne was a princess who lived about 600 AD. She laid on the waters of this well a spell thus described by Richard Carew in 1602 AD—'The quality that man or wife / Whom chance or choice attaines / First of this sacred stream to drinke / Thereby the mastery gains.'"

In Victorian times the well had the reputation of conferring supremacy to the marriage partner who first tasted it. There is also a ballad called The Well of St Keyne written by Robert Southey; it is set to an adaptation of the air of the Helston Furry Dance.

== See also ==
- St Ceinwen's Church, Cerrigceinwen – a church in Anglesey dedicated to her
