= Liskeard North (electoral division) =

Electoral division of Cornwall in the UK

- Electoral district
- Liskeard North shown within Cornwall (click to zoom in)
- Country: England
- Sovereign state: United Kingdom
- UK Parliament: South East Cornwall
- Councillors: Nick Craker (Conservative)

Liskeard North (Cornish: Lyskerrys North) is an electoral division of Cornwall in the United Kingdom and returns one member to sit on Cornwall Council. The current Councillor is Nick Craker, a Conservative.

== Extent ==
Liskeard North covers the north of Liskeard, including the suburbs of Trembraze and Addington. The division covers 690 hectares in total.

== Election results ==
=== 2017 election ===
2017 election: Liskeard North
Party	Candidate	Votes	%	±%
Conservative	Nick Craker	227	35.4	
Independent	Tony Powell	146	22.8	
Labour	Kerry Cassidy	97	15.1	
Liberal Democrats	Nik Alatortsev	89	13.9	
Independent	Roger Holmes	79	12.3	
Majority		81	12.6	
Rejected ballots		3	0.5	
Turnout		641	41.2	
Conservative gain from Independent		Swing		

=== 2013 election ===
2013 election: Liskeard North
Party	Candidate	Votes	%	±%
Independent	Roger Holmes	151	28.7	
Liberal Democrats	Jan Powell	145	27.6	
Conservative	Thusha Balalojanan	115	21.9	
UKIP	Jenifer Lucas	110	20.9	
Majority		6	1.1	
Rejected ballots		5	1.0	
Turnout		526	36.4	
Independent gain from Conservative		Swing		

=== 2009 election ===
2009 election: Liskeard North
Party	Candidate	Votes	%	±%
Conservative	Jan Powell	284	46.9	
Mebyon Kernow	Roger Holmes	184	30.4	
Liberal Democrats	Matthew McTaggart	137	22.6	
Majority		100	16.5	
Rejected ballots		4	0.7	
Turnout		605	43.1	
Conservative win (new seat)				
