= Bodway =

Hamlet in Cornwall, England

Coordinates: 50.4368°N 4.4013°W

- Location within the United Kingdom
- OS grid reference: SX295624
- Civil parish: Menheniot
- Unitary authority: Cornwall
- Ceremonial county: Cornwall
- Region: South West
- Post town: LISKEARD
- Postcode district: PL14
- Dialling code: 01579
- Police
- Fire
- Ambulance
- UK Parliament: South East Cornwall

Bodway is a hamlet in Cornwall, England, UK. It is situated 0.8 km (0.5 mi) southeast of the village of Menheniot, within the civil parish of the same name. According to the Post Office, the 2011 census population was included in the civil parish of St Ive.
