= Churchbridge =

Churchbridge may refer to:

- Churchbridge, Cornwall, England
- Churchbridge, Saskatchewan, Canada
- Rural Municipality of Churchbridge No. 211, Saskatchewan, Canada
- Churchbridge, Staffordshire, England
