= Runston Chapel =

- Runston Church; Eglwys Runston (Welsh)
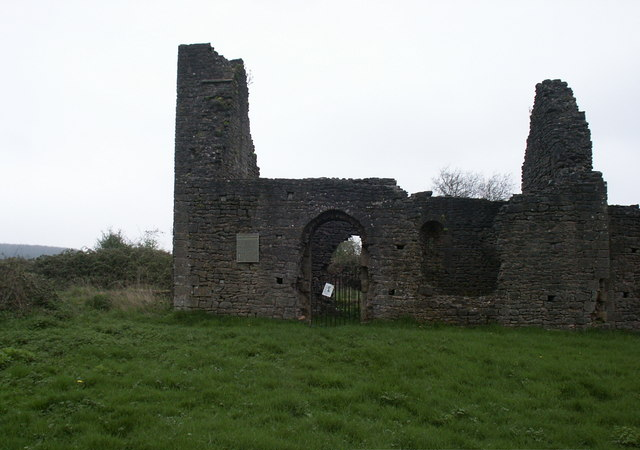
- "a symbol of holiness for over seven centuries"

- Location within Monmouthshire
- 51.6209°N 2.7305°W
- Type: Chapel
- Location: Mathern, Monmouthshire

Site notes
- Governing body: CADW

Scheduled monument
- Official name: Runston Medieval Village Site & Runston Chapel
- Designated: 9 February 1948
- Reference no.: MM095

Runston Chapel, Mathern, Monmouthshire, Wales, is the ruin of a chapel dating back to the early 12th century. It is the only remaining visible remnant of the medieval village of Runston, although parts of the former domestic dwellings can be identified under turf-covered mounds on the site. Twenty-five such structures have been identified. By the 16th century, the village was in decline and, by 1785, had been entirely abandoned. The ruins of the chapel, and the site, are in the care of Cadw.

== History and architecture ==
The village of Runston dates from the Medieval period, and Cadw suggests a construction date for the chapel of the early 12th century. The chapel was dedicated to Keyne, one of the daughters of Brychan of Brycheiniog, an Early Middle Ages kingdom that lay to the north of the Kingdom of Gwent.

In the 18th century, the village went into decline. By 1798, when William Coxe arrived at the chapel, "the roof was fallen down, a large and broken font was lying on the floor, among the weeds and elder trees". Fred Hando, the Monmouthshire writer and illustrator, who visited about 150 years later, suggested that the decline was in part deliberate; "the men of Runston were a disreputable gang, smugglers, sheep-stealers and poachers. Unable otherwise to dislodge them, their landlords allowed the houses to fall into disrepair". Hando nevertheless admired the chapel ruins, "a hilltop symbol of holiness for over seven centuries".

Coflein describes the architectural style of the chapel as Romanesque. John Newman, the architectural historian, in his Gwent/Monmouthshire Pevsner, notes that the chapel's unchanged dimensions give "an excellent idea of the neat symmetry" of the Romanesque style. The chapel consists of a chancel and nave with a small bellcote at the western end. Cadw's listing record for the scheduled monument notes that it is "of national importance for its potential to enhance our knowledge of the organisation and practice of medieval Christianity".

Since 2024, Cadw, who care for the site, describe it as a church, as "Runston Church".

== Sources ==
- Hando, Fred (1987). Chris Barber (ed.). Hando's Gwent. Vol. 1. Abergavenny, Wales: Blorenge Books. ISBN 9780951044452. OCLC 18745431.
- Coxe, William (1995) [1801]. An Historical Tour of Monmouthshire: Volume 1. Cardiff: Merton Priory Press. ISBN 978-1-8989-3709-8. OCLC 34476778.
- Newman, John (2000). Gwent/Monmouthshire. The Buildings of Wales. Penguin. ISBN 0-14-071053-1.
