= St Ceinwen's Church, Cerrigceinwen =

Coordinates: 53.236776°N 4.363334°W

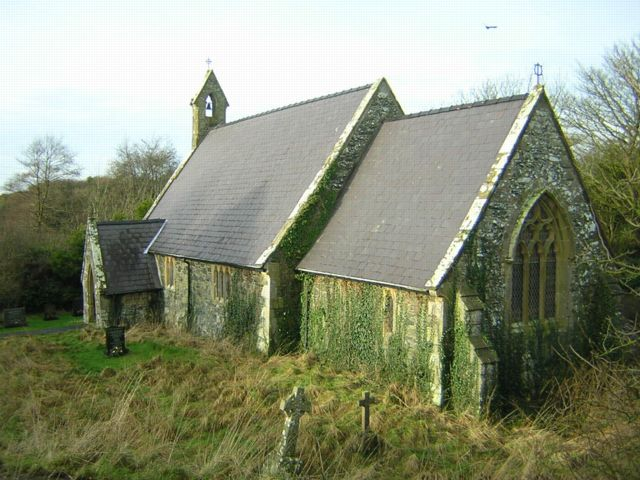
- St Ceinwen's in 2006

- Location in Anglesey
- Location: Cerrigceinwen, Anglesey
- Country: Wales
- Previous denomination: Church in Wales

History
- Status: Parish church
- Founded: 7th century or earlier
- Dedication: St Ceinwen

Architecture
- Functional status: Closed
- Heritage designation: Grade II
- Designated: 30 January 1968
- Architect(s): Henry Kennedy and Frederick Rogers
- Architectural type: Church
- Style: Decorated
- Completed: 1860

Specifications
- Length: c. 39 ft 8 in (12.1 m)
- Materials: Rubble masonry and slate

St Ceinwen's Church, Cerrigceinwen, is a former parish church in the countryside of central Anglesey, north Wales. The present building dates from 1860, although the site has been used for worship since at least the 7th century. The doorway reuses some old carved gravestones, one from the 9th to 11th centuries, and another from the 12th century. The church grounds contain a well, once thought to have healing properties. The church and the well are both named after St Ceinwen, an early Celtic female saint.

The church is closed and no longer used for worship by the Church in Wales and, as of July 2012, was for sale. It is a Grade II listed building, a national designation given to "buildings of special interest, which warrant every effort being made to preserve them", in particular because it is a "simple rural church" from the 19th century that reuses older carved stonework.

== History and location ==
St Ceinwen's Church is in a rural location in the middle of Anglesey, north Wales. It is set in a hollow at the side of the road near the village of Cerrigceinwen, about 2 miles (3.2 km) to the south-west of Llangefni, the county town of Anglesey. The date of establishment of the first church on this site is uncertain. According to a 2006 guide to the churches of Anglesey, worship began here in the 7th century. The 19th-century writer Samuel Lewis, however, stated that it was supposed that a church was founded at the site in 450. Some repair work was carried out to a medieval church on this site in 1839 (although the date of its original construction is unknown) and the current structure was erected in 1860. The architects were Henry Kennedy (architect of the Diocese of Bangor) and Frederick Rogers.

The dedication is to St Ceinwen, known elsewhere in Wales and in Cornwall as Cain or Keyne (in Welsh, Cain means "fair" or "beautiful", and Ceinwen means "Blessed Cain"). She was the daughter of King Brychan Brycheiniog; her siblings St Dwynwen and St Dyfnan are commemorated elsewhere on Anglesey, at St Dwynwen's Church, Llanddwyn and St Dyfnan's Church, Llanddyfnan respectively. A spring in the south of the churchyard is known as "St Ceinwen's Well"; according to the 19th-century clergyman and antiquarian Harry Longueville Jones, it was "once much resorted to as a spring that could cure many diseases."

The church is no longer used for worship by the Church in Wales and, as of July 2012, it was being offered for sale at £65,000. Some of the surrounding land is included in the sale, but the graveyards to the front and rear of the church are not.

== Architecture and fittings ==
The church, which is built in the Decorated style, has a nave at the west end and a chancel at the east end. It is built from rubble masonry dressed with freestone; the roof is made of slate and edged with stone. There is a porch at the west end of the south wall of the nave and a vestry at the west end of the north wall of the chancel, abutting the nave. The nave measures approximately 39 feet 8 inches by 20 feet 8 inches (12.10m by 6.30 m) and the chancel is shorter and narrower at approximately 18 feet by 14 feet 1 inch (5.50 by 4.30 m). The total floor space of the church is approximately 1,076 square feet (100 m^{2}). There is a large bellcote at the west end of the nave, containing one bell.

The arched doorway in the porch reuses two old carved gravestones. One from the 12th century is cut at its head with a circle containing a rough cross of petals and has a decorated key design on the shaft. It is used as the lintel of the doorway. Part of another gravestone, dating from the 9th to the 11th centuries and with a cross in a circle, is set to the right of the door. Inside, three steps lead up from the nave to the chancel through a decorated chancel arch. A further two steps lead up from the chancel to the sanctuary. The internal woodwork of the roof is exposed. The window in the east wall of the chancel is a pointed arch and has three lights (sections of window separated by mullions) topped with trefoils (a pattern of three overlapping circles). The nave windows are also pointed arches and variously have one, two or three lights topped with trefoils. The windows contain coloured leaded glass rather than stained glass pictures.

The circular stone font dates from the 12th century but is set on a modern base. It has five panels, four of which are decorated with interlacing carvings of crosses and knots while the fifth is blank. The other fittings of the church date from the 19th century and include an octagonal pulpit with decorated panels. The west wall of the nave has a stone memorial to a Reverend William Griffith who died in 1752, the south wall has a war memorial to the dead of the First World War, and the north wall has an inscribed stone commemorating a Morris Lloyd (or Llwyd), a Royalist who was killed by Cromwell's troops in 1647.

A survey of church plate within the Bangor diocese in 1906 recorded a chalice and a paten dating from 1823. It recorded that a pewter flagon, known from church records to have been owned by the church from 1739 to 1834, was lost.

The churchyard contains a Commonwealth War Grave of a Royal Army Medical Corps sergeant of World War II.

== Assessment ==
The church has national recognition and statutory protection from unauthorised alteration as it has been designated as a Grade II listed building, which is the lowest of the three grades of listing, designating "buildings of special interest, which warrant every effort being made to preserve them". It was given this status on 30 January 1968 and has been listed as "a simple rural church of the 19th century". Cadw, the Welsh Government body responsible for the built heritage of Wales and the inclusion of Welsh buildings on the statutory lists, also comments that the church is "particularly notable for retention of early carved stonework in the later fabric."

Two writers in the 19th century described the old church. The antiquarian Angharad Llwyd described it (before the 1839 building work) as "a neat small edifice, and appropriately fitted-up". Writing in 1846, after some rebuilding, Longueville Jones said that the east window was "one of the purest models, as to proportion and workmanship", in Anglesey, and noted the "richly sculptured compartments" of the font.
