= Muchlarnick =

Hamlet in Cornwall, England

Coordinates: 50°22′50″N 4°30′21″W

Muchlarnick (Cornish: Lannergh Veur, meaning great woodland clearing) is a hamlet in Cornwall, England. It is about two miles east of Lanreath in the civil parish of Pelynt.

== See also ==
- Trefanny Hill
