= Duloe stone circle =

Stone circle in southeast Cornwall, England

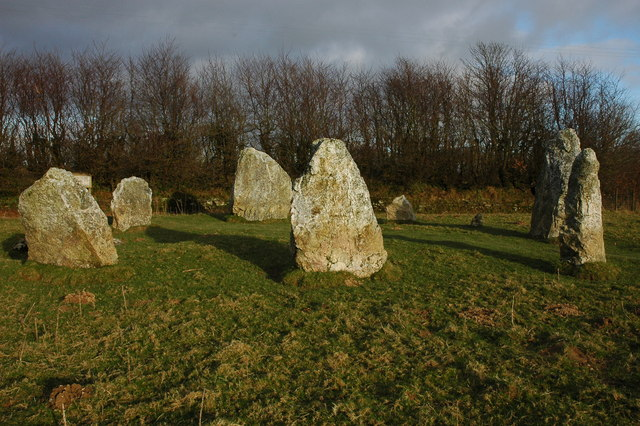
- Duloe stone circle

- Location within Cornwall
- Interactive map of Duloe stone circle
- 50°23′53″N 4°29′01″W
- Type: Stone circle
- Periods: Bronze Age
- Location: Duloe, Cornwall

Duloe stone circle or Duloe circle is a stone circle near the village of Duloe, located 5 miles (8.0 km) from Looe in southeast Cornwall, England, UK.

== Description ==
It is made of eight bright white quartzite stones placed in an oval shaped circle. Stones vary in height, the largest on the south being over 12 tons and 2.65 metres (8.7 ft) high. The dimensions in a north–south direction are 11.9 metres (39 ft) by 10.7 metres (35 ft). Its original width is unknown as it was moved in 1861 due to an intersecting hedge. Two of the stones were broken in the manoeuvre. It was also claimed that a Bronze Age urn full of bones was smashed after being found under one of the stones and allegedly crumbled into the air. It can be accessed near Duloe village on the B3254, signposted on the west of the road in a field. The site inspired the 2006 video game Barrow Hill.

== Literature ==
- William Borlase (1754). Observations on the Antiquities, Historical and Monumental, of the County of Cornwall ...: Consisting of several essays on the first inhabitants, Druid-superstition, customs, and remains of the most remote antiquity, in Britain, and the British Isles ... With a summary of the religious, civil, and military state of Cornwall before the Norman Conquest ... Printed by W. Jackson, in the High-Strand.
- William Copeland Borlase (1872). Naenia Cornubiae: the cromlechs and tumuli of Cornwall. Llanerch. ISBN 978-1-897853-36-8.
- William C. Lukis (1885). The Prehistoric Stone Monuments of the British Isles: Cornwall. Printed for Nichols and Sons for the Society of Antiquaries.
- Aubrey Burl (2005). A Guide to the Stone Circles of Britain, Ireland and Brittany. Yale University Press. pp. 32–. ISBN 978-0-300-11406-5.
