= Cerrigceinwen =

Coordinates: 53.2345°N 4.3568°W

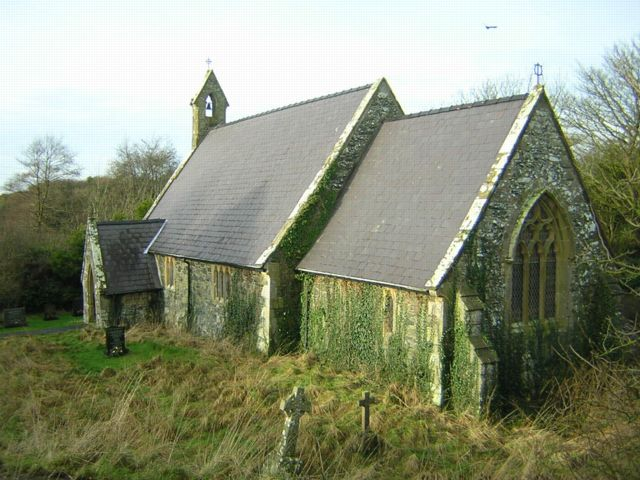
- St Ceinwen's Church

- Location within Anglesey
- OS grid reference: SH 4280 7342
  - Cardiff: 131 mi (211 km)
  - London: 214 mi (344 km)
- Community: Llangristiolus
- Principal area: Anglesey
- Preserved county: Gwynedd
- Country: Wales
- Sovereign state: United Kingdom
- Post town: Bodorgan
- Police: North Wales
- Fire: North Wales
- Ambulance: Welsh
- UK Parliament: Ynys Môn
- Senedd Cymru – Welsh Parliament: Bangor Conwy Môn

Cerrigceinwen (Welsh: ['kɛrɪɡ'kɛinʊɛn]) is a village in the community of Llangristiolus, Anglesey, Wales. It is also a former parish. The church was dedicated to Saint Ceinwen.

== History ==
The name "Cerrigceinwen" means "the stones of Ceinwen". Cerrigceinwen was a civil parish, at the 1971 census (the last before the abolition of the parish), Cerrigceinwen had a population of 493. In 1974 Cerrigceinwen became a community, on 1 April 1984 the community was abolished.

== See also ==
- List of localities in Wales by population
