= Highercliff =

Coordinates: 50.388°N 4.466°W

- Location within Cornwall
- OS grid reference: SX248571
- Civil parish: Duloe
- Unitary authority: Cornwall
- Ceremonial county: Cornwall
- Region: South West
- Country: England
- Sovereign state: United Kingdom

Highercliff is a hamlet in the parish of Duloe, Cornwall, England].
