= Adrenalin Quarry =

Amusement park in Menheniot, Cornwall, England

- Previously known as Clicker Tor Quarry
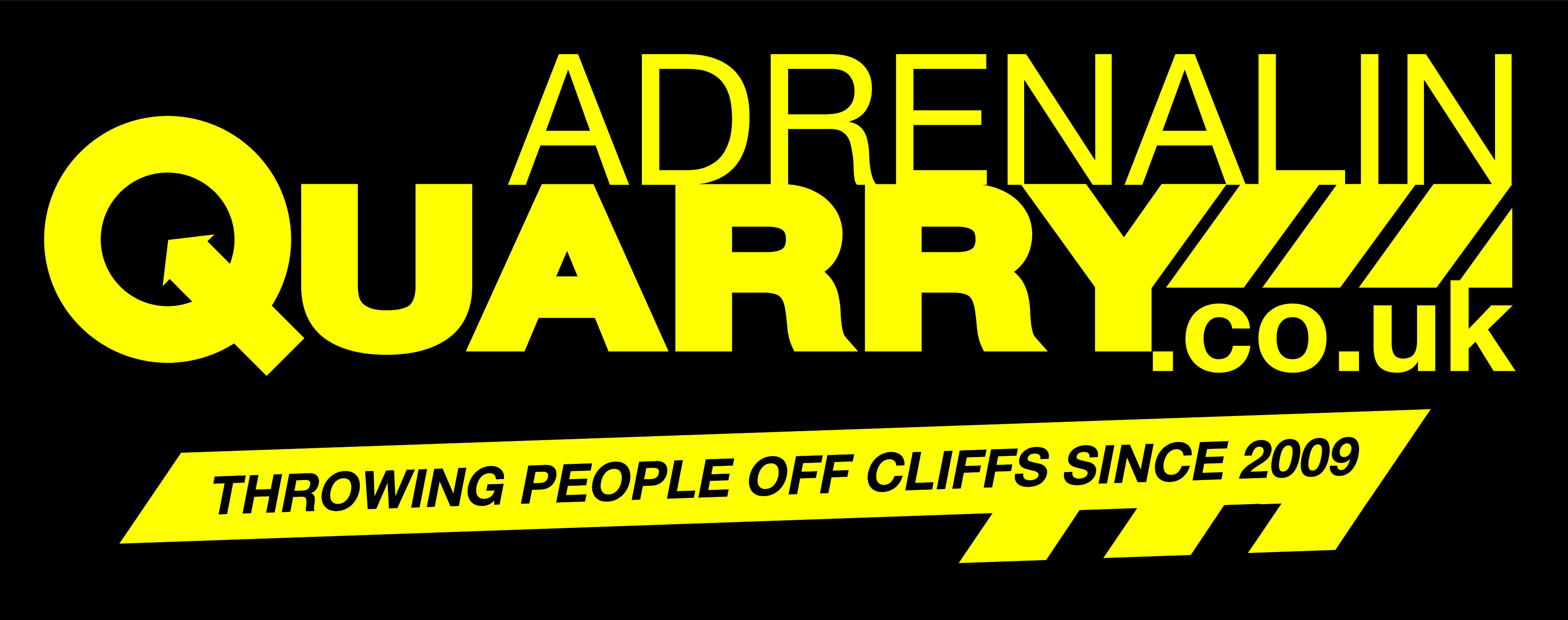
- ADRENALIN QUARRY
- Interactive map of Adrenalin Quarry
- Location: Menheniot, Cornwall, UK
- Coordinates: 50.417°N 4.446°W
- Opened: 2009
- Owner: Adrenalin Quarry Ltd
- Slogan: "Throwing People Off Cliffs Since 2009"
- Operating season: Weekends 10 AM – 5 PM

Attractions
- Total: 5
- Website: http://www.adrenalinquarry.co.uk/

Adrenalin Quarry is a family-owned visitor attraction and adventure park in Menheniot, Cornwall, United Kingdom. It opened in Easter 2009, on the site of an old flooded quarry and offers five rides: The Aquapark, The Zip, The Giant Swing, Axe throwing and Karting . As an area of special scientific interest, the attraction concentrates on low-carbon gravity rides which have minimal or zero impact on the local environment. It has been featured in a number of British newspapers, including The Sunday Times and The Guardian as a top attraction to visit in Cornwall.

== Origins & History ==
- Clicker Trikes 1986-89
- Quad Centre 1989-92
- Kartworld
- Hoverworld 2009 - 2010
- Adrenalin Quarry 2009 - Current

Adrenalin Quarry was formerly known as Clicker Tor Quarry. (It's still called that locally.) Worked for Blue Elvin rock from 1932 to 1969, it was an important business providing much-needed employment and a boost to South-East Cornwall's local economy. After the closure the quarry grew derelict and was flooded to a depth of 22m, until in 1986, Clicker Trikes, now Kartworld, opened its doors to the public. In January, 2009, under the guidance of current owner, Will Sneyd, the first posts went in at the western end of the lake to build the launch platform for Adrenalin Quarry's first ride - The Zip. Adrenalin Quarry opened in Easter 2009 and has added new rides and facilities each year since then. In Easter 2018 the Aqua Park opened, a large 'total wipeout' style inflatable assault course on the lake of the flooded quarry, taking the total amount of activities at the attraction up to 5.

== Rides ==
Ride name	Date opened	Stats	Notes
The Zip	2009	490m long, 50m high, top speed 40 mph	Twin wires, youngest jumper 2 years, oldest 93
Giant Swing	2012	60m high over water, making it UK's tallest swing.	Built on the cliff-top, chair release at near 90° to the vertical
Karting	2009	800m all weather track	Arrive and Drive, Adult, Youth and Junior
Axe Throwing		45mins of organised mayhem.	Throw axes under expert supervision
Aqua Park	2018	Large inflatable assault course on the lake	Monkey bars, swings, slides, trampolines and more...
