= Tregarrick Mill =

Tregarrick Mill is a hamlet in the parish of Pelynt, Cornwall, England, United Kingdom.
