= Trelowia =

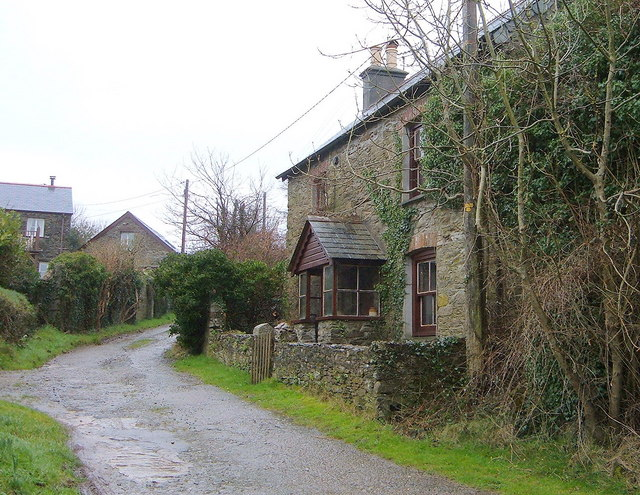
Trelowia

Trelowia is a hamlet southeast of Widegates, Cornwall, England, United Kingdom.

Trelowia is in the parish of St Martin-by-Looe and the manor belongs to the Duchy of Cornwall.
