= Merrymeet =

Hamlet in east Cornwall, England

Coordinates: 50°28′N 4°25′W

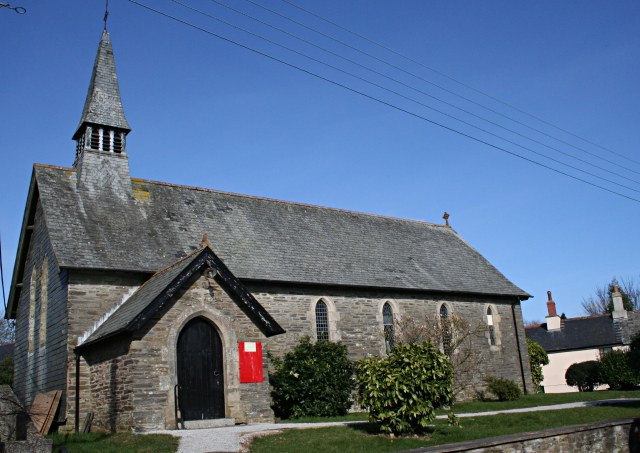
Merrymeet Church

Merrymeet (Cornish: Kuntelvaveri) is a hamlet in north of the parish of Menheniot in east Cornwall, England. Merrymeet is on the A390 main road.

During the Blitz in World War II, Merrymeet was used as a safe haven for children.

During the night of 25 August 1940, bombs fell on many parts of Cornwall including Carclew Woods, Porth Kea, Pencale Point, Portscatho, Merrymeet, Draynes, St. Gluvias and Halton Quay, which was the only place where damage occurred.

The stained glass window above the altar is a memorial to the fallen members of the Parish. Details for this are listed on War Memorials on line.

The village had one church - St Mary's Church. It was a mission church: it was built in the early 20th century for people living in the small village of Merrymeet, giving them a place to worship that was closer than the main parish church of St Lalluwy's in Menheniot. In 2019, it was determined that the structure of the church was in danger of becoming unsafe, and would cost around £150,000 to repair. With the parochial church council (PCC) having no way of raising the funds itself, a public consultation was arrange to discuss its future. This was postponed due to the coronavirus pandemic and no final decision has yet been taken about whether to close the church. The building was closed on 15 October 2022 and locked up. With the building now falling into disrepair, the grounds are also now closed to the public. Merrymeet is now without a community hub at present but the local residents association is looking to raise funds to build its own community hub for Merrymeet and the surrounding areas (Pengover Green etc.)
