= Trefanny Hill =

Hamlet in Cornwall, England

Coordinates: 50.388°N 4.525°W

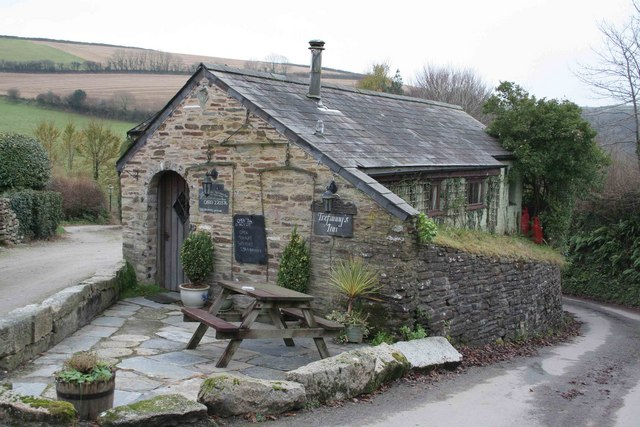
Trefanny Hill Inn

Trefanny Hill is a hamlet in the parish of Duloe, Cornwall, England, United Kingdom. The hamlet was formerly called Hille or Hill.

None of the men from the hamlet returned from the First World War and it was abandoned for 50 years. It was purchased in 1962 and restored as a holiday village.
