= Wringworthy =

Hamlet in Cornwall, England

Coordinates: 50.3956°N 4.4400°W

Wringworthy is a hamlet in Cornwall, England, United Kingdom. It is in the parish of Morval on the A387 road.
