= Liskeard East (electoral division) =

Electoral division of Cornwall in the UK

- Electoral district
- Liskeard East shown within Cornwall (click to zoom in)
- Country: England
- Sovereign state: United Kingdom
- UK Parliament: South East Cornwall
- Councillors: Sally Hawken (Independent)

Liskeard East (Cornish: Lyskerrys Est) is an electoral division of Cornwall in the United Kingdom and returns one member to sit on Cornwall Council. The current Councillor is Sally Hawken, an Independent.

== Extent ==
Liskeard East covers the centre and east of the town of Liskeard. The division covers 164 hectares in total.

== Election results ==
=== 2017 election ===
2017 election: Liskeard East
Party	Candidate	Votes	%	±%
Independent	Sally Hawken	358	34.2	
Conservative	Kelvin Poplett	286	27.3	
Liberal Democrats	Derris Watson	252	24.0	
Labour	Susan Shand	151	14.4	
Majority		72	6.9	
Rejected ballots		1	0.1	
Turnout		1048	28.8	
Independent hold		Swing		

=== 2013 election ===
2013 election: Liskeard East
Party	Candidate	Votes	%	±%
Independent	Sally Hawken	334	33.1	
Liberal Democrats	Tony Powell	283	28.0	
UKIP	Oliver Challis	235	23.3	
Conservative	John Stevenson	145	14.4	
Majority		51	5.1	
Rejected ballots		12	1.2	
Turnout		1009	26.4	
Independent win (new seat)				
