= Doublebois =

Coordinates: 50.4560°N 4.5387°W

Doublebois: Cornish: Dewgoes
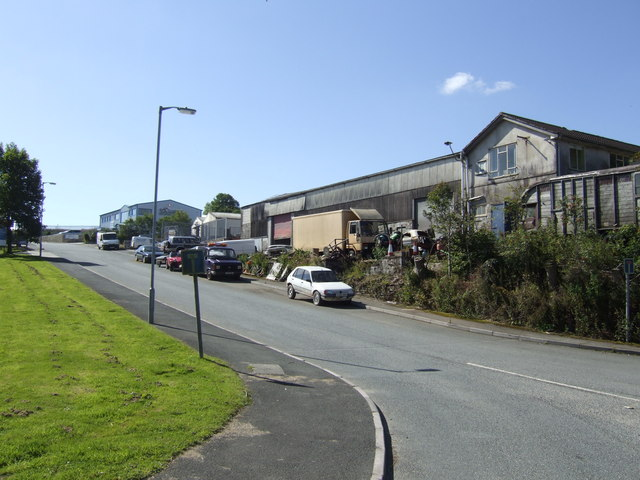
- Doublebois Industrial Estate

- Location within Cornwall
- OS grid reference: SX199649
- Civil parish: Dobwalls
- District: Cornwall
- Shire county: Cornwall
- Region: South West
- Country: England
- Sovereign state: United Kingdom
- Post town: LISKEARD
- Postcode district: PL14
- Dialling code: 01579
- Police: Devon and Cornwall
- Fire: Cornwall
- Ambulance: South Western
- UK Parliament: South East Cornwall

Doublebois (Cornish: Dewgoes) (pronounced /ˈdʌbəlbɔɪz/ DUB-əl-boyz), is a village in south Cornwall, England, United Kingdom. It is in the civil parish of Dobwalls approximately three miles (5 km) west of Liskeard.

Doublebois formerly had a railway station on the Cornish Main Line which closed on 5 October 1964. Today the main transport link is the adjacent A38 Plymouth to Bodmin trunk road.
