= Churchbridge, Cornwall =

Hamlet in Cornwall, England

Coordinates: 50.400°N 4.507°W

Churchbridge: Cornish: Pons an Eglos
- Hamlet
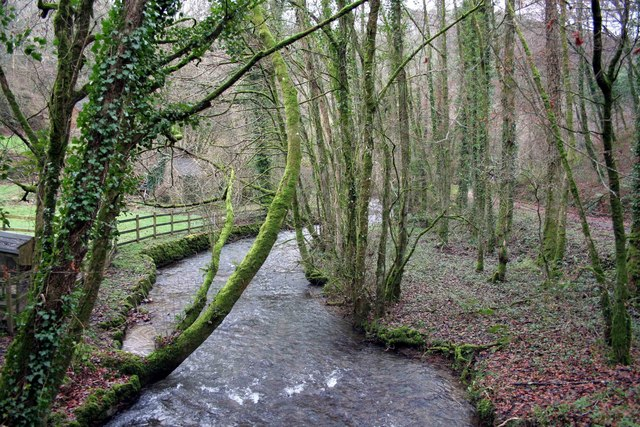
- The West Looe River looking downstream from Churchbridge

- Location within Cornwall
- Unitary authority: Cornwall
- Region: South West
- Country: England
- Sovereign state: United Kingdom
- Police: Devon and Cornwall
- Fire: Cornwall
- Ambulance: South Western

Churchbridge (Cornish: Pons an Eglos) is a hamlet in Cornwall, England. It is a mile west of Duloe, and is situated on the West Looe River. Both banks of the river are wooded, and to the north of the bridge is a disused quarry and Tremadart Mills, marked as a corn mill on the 1882 map.
