= Narkurs =

Hamlet in Cornwall, England

Coordinates: 50.37°N 04.35°W

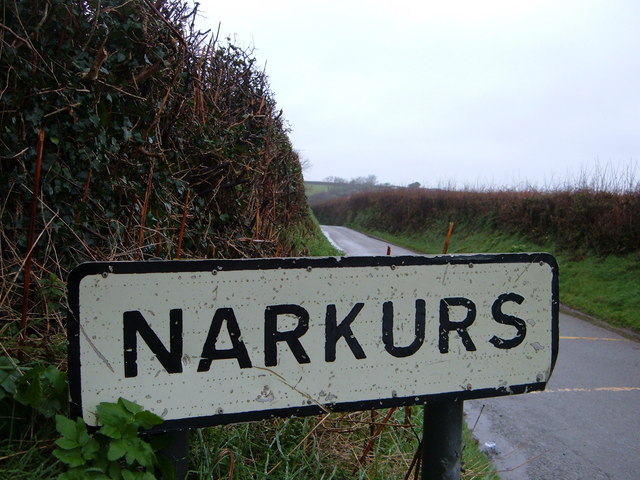

- Location within Cornwall
- OS grid reference: SX3255
- Shire county: Cornwall
- Region: South West
- Country: England
- Sovereign state: United Kingdom
- Post town: TORPOINT
- Postcode district: PL11
- Dialling code: 01503
- Police: Devon and Cornwall
- Fire: Cornwall
- Ambulance: South Western
- UK Parliament: South East Cornwall

Narkurs is a hamlet in the south east of Cornwall, England. It is part of the civil parish of Deviock. It is about 2 km southeast of Hessenford. Historically an agricultural settlement, Narkurs has become smaller as this industry has declined, and in 2007 consisted of only 20 homes.
