= Addington, Cornwall =

Residential area of Liskeard, Cornwall, England

Coordinates: 50.459°N 4.454°W

Addington is a residential area of northeast Liskeard, in Cornwall, England, United Kingdom. It is located at grid reference SX 259 651. According to the Post Office the population of the area at the 2011 census was included in the civil parish of North Hill.

Addington is on the A390 road from Liskeard to Callington and has its own post office and a fish and chip shop, separate from the main town. Addington was originally a separate settlement but has merged into Liskeard as it grew in population.
