= Morval, Cornwall =

Hamlet in Cornwall, England

Coordinates: 50.384°N 4.448°W

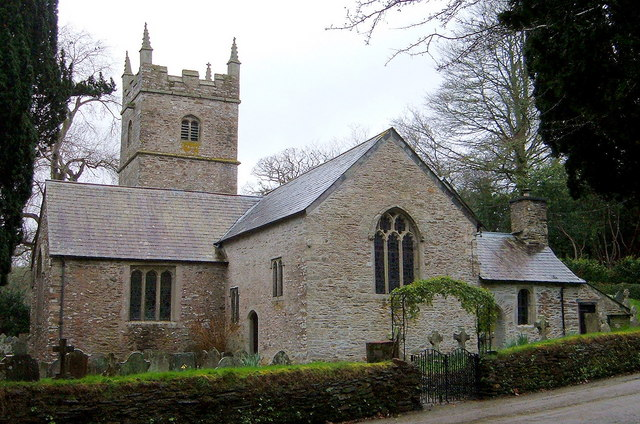
St Wenna's Church, Morval, the parish church

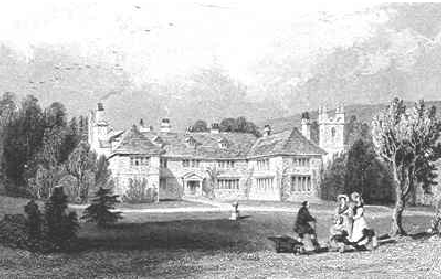
"Morval, Cornwall, the seat of John Buller Esq." 1832 Engraving by William Alexander le Petit (fl. 1829–1855) from an original painting by Thomas Allom (1804–1872) published in "Cornwall Illustrated" (1832) by Fisher, Son & Co., London

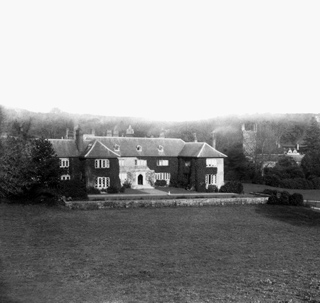
Morval House, Looe, Cornwall in 1888

Morval (Cornish: Morval) is a rural civil parish, hamlet and historic manor in southeast Cornwall, England, United Kingdom. The hamlet is approximately two miles (3 km) north of Looe and five miles (8 km) south of Liskeard.

Morval parish is in the Liskeard Registration District and the population in the 2001 census was 616, which increased to 711 at the 2011 census. The meaning of the name Morval is unknown. To the north the parish is bounded by the parishes of Dobwalls and Trewidland and Menheniot, to the east by St Germans, to the south by St Martin-by-Looe and to the west by Duloe.

== St Wenna's Church ==
The 13th-century parish church is situated in a secluded location at OS Grid Ref SX260567 in Morval hamlet. It was probably built in the 13th century with transepts and a north aisle added in the 15th century. The west tower is built of slate.

The dedication to Saint Wenna could refer to Saint Wenna, to whom three other churches are dedicated, or another contemporaneous Wenna, also called Gwen, who was queen of Cornwall. The latter is known as the wife of Selyf (or Salomon), mother of Saint Cybi, and sister of Saint Non. She was martyred in Brittany with her husband. Both saints share the feast day of 18 October.

A monument survives to Walter (or William?) Coode (died 1637) and his family. Two early pieces of communion plate survive comprising a paten of 1528–29, plain in design and the only pre-Reformation plate in Cornwall, and a chalice of circa 1576. The church contains the oldest known sundial in Cornwall, dating back to 1671, and is one of only three 17th-century dials in Cornish churches. The dial is in a poor condition and a motto on the dial reads Ut Ora sic Vita.

== Manor ==
A hundred metres south of the church is Morval House, the manor house, a large Tudor residence which was once the home of the Glynn, Buller and Kitson families. The house was altered in the 18th century and according to Nikolaus Pevsner (1970) is "one of the best in Cornwall". The descent of the manor of Morval was as follows:

=== Coode ===
The estate was the property of John Coode, whose daughter and sole heiress Anne Coode married John Buller (1632–1716), MP, of Shillingham near Saltash, in Cornwall.

=== Buller ===
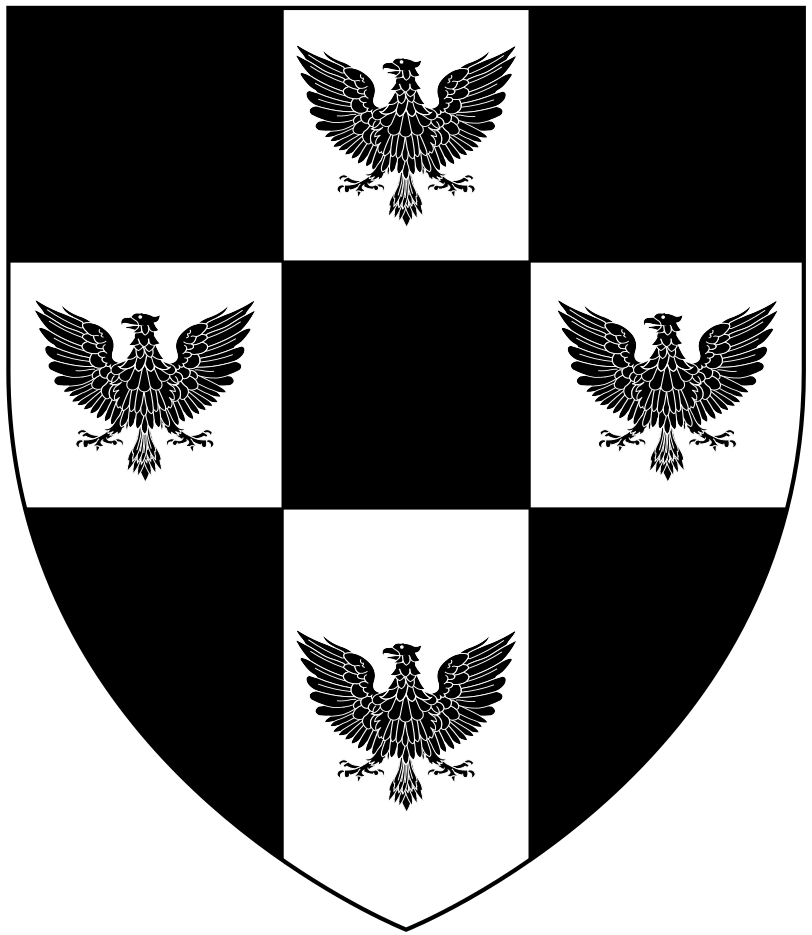
Arms of Buller: Sable, on a cross argent quarter pierced of the field four eagles displayed of the first

The ancient family of Buller is descended from Ralph Buller of Word in Somerset, sixth in descent from whom was Richard Buller who settled in Cornwall and married the heiress of Tregarrick. They derived much of their political power from their kinship to the Trelawny family of Trelawny in the parish of Pelynt, Cornwall, who controlled the pocket borough of nearby East Looe.

- John Buller (1632–1716), MP, of Shillingham near Saltash, in Cornwall. His son, who predeceased him, was John Buller (1668–1701), MP for Lostwithiel in 1701.
- John Francis Buller (1695–1751) (grandson), of Morval, MP for Saltash 1718–22, himself the father of three members of parliament: James Buller (1717–1765), John Buller (1721–1786), Lord of the Admiralty and Francis Buller (1723–1764) and of William Buller (1735–1796), Bishop of Exeter.
- James Buller (1717–1765) (eldest son), MP for East Looe 1741–47 and for Cornwall 1748–65. His first wife Elizabeth Gould was the heiress of the estate of Downes near Crediton in Devon, which became the principal seat of the senior line of the Buller family. He married Secondly in 1744 to Lady Jane Bathurst (died 1794), second (or third.) daughter of Allen Bathurst, 1st Earl Bathurst. Morval became the inheritance of his eldest son from this second marriage.
- John Buller (1744–1790) (eldest son by father's second marriage), of Morval, MP for Exeter 1768–74, Launceston 1774–80, West Looe 1780-2, a Lord of the Treasury. He inherited the estate of Morval from his father. In 1770 he married Anne Lemon (died 1800), daughter of William Lemon of Carclew House, Mylor, Cornwall, and sister of Sir William Lemon, 1st Baronet (1748–1824) of Carclew.
- John Buller (1771–1849) (eldest son), JP, DL, High Sheriff of Cornwall in 1835, MP for west Looe 1796 and 1826–27. In 1798 he married twice, firstly to Elizabeth Yorke (died 1802), daughter of Hon. and Right Rev. James Yorke, Bishop of Ely (a son of Philip Yorke, 1st Earl of Hardwicke (1690–1764), Lord Chancellor), without progeny. Secondly in 1814 he married Harriet Hulse (died 1868), daughter of Sir Edward Hulse, 3rd Baronet, by whom he had one son and four daughters.
- John Francis Buller (1818–1890) (only son), of Morval, JP, DL, High Sheriff of Cornwall in 1853. He died without progeny and was succeeded by his sister Charlotte Buller, wife of Henry Hawkins Tremayne, into which family passed the estate of Morval.

=== Tremayne ===
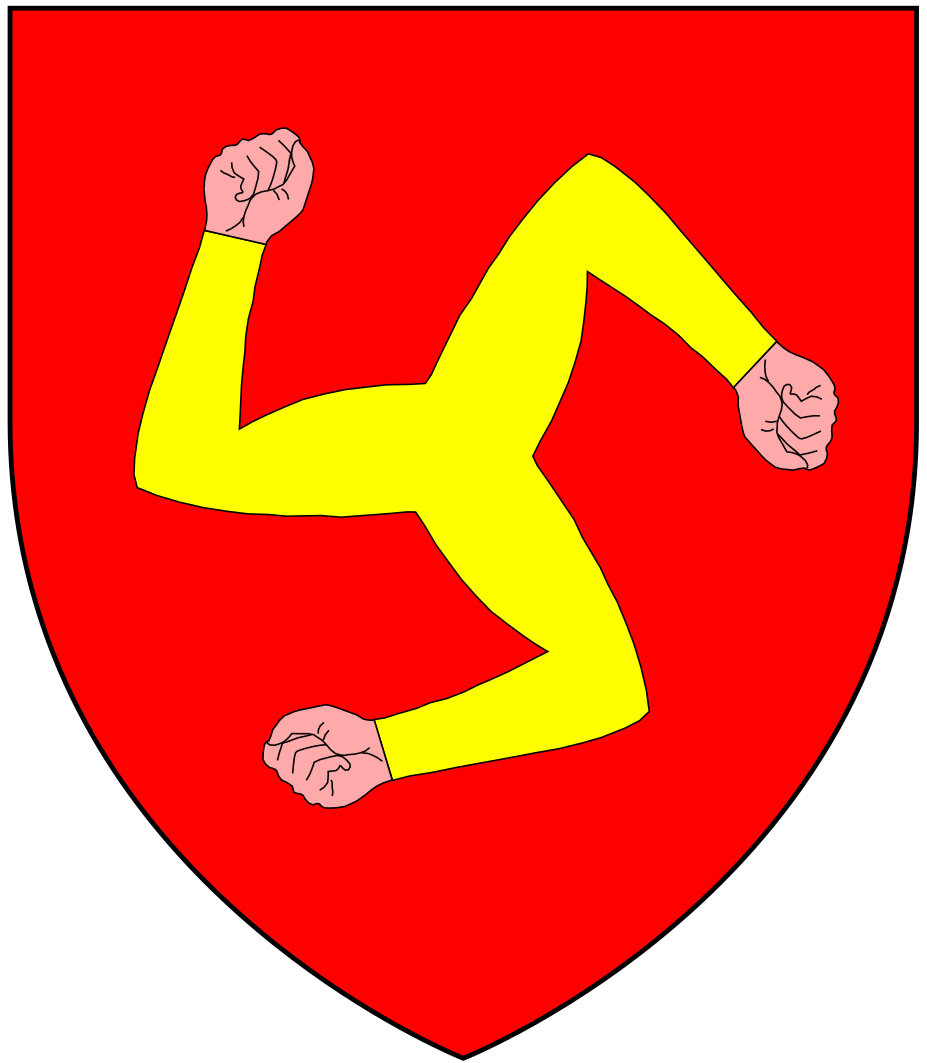
Arms of Tremayne: Gules, three dexter arms conjoined at the shoulders and flexed in triangle or the fists clenched argent. Canting arms from French trois mains ("three hands")

- Henry Hawkins Tremayne (died 1894), JP, who in 1858 married his cousin Charlotte Buller (died 1909), heiress of Morval. He was the 3rd son of John Hearle Tremayne (1780–1851), JP, DL, of Heligan, St Austell, Cornwall, and Sydenham House, Lew Down, Devon, High Sheriff of Cornwall in 1831, MP for Cornwall 1806–26. Henry's mother was Caroline Matilda Lemon (died 1864), youngest daughter of Sir William Lemon, 1st Baronet (1748–1824) of Carclew. He was a descendant of the ancient family of Tremayne, which in the reign of King Edward III (1327–1377) were lords of the manor of Tremayne in the parish of St Martin, Helford Haven.
- Henry Arthur Tremayne (1866–1921) (eldest son), a captain in the Duke of Cornwall's Light Infantry.
- Arthur Hearle Tremayne (1868 – after 1937) (brother), a captain in the Royal Navy.
