= No Man's Land, Cornwall =

Hamlet in Cornwall, England

Coordinates: 50.383°N 4.428°W

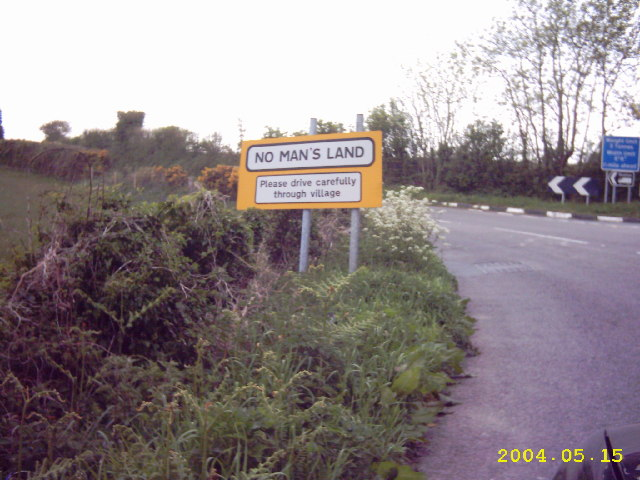
Approaching No Man's Land

No Man's Land is a crossroads hamlet in south-east Cornwall, England, United Kingdom. It is situated approximately two miles (3 km) northeast of Looe on the B3253 road to Widegates.

An annual weekend event called Morval Vintage Steam Rally, which raises funds for local charities, takes place at Bray Farm in No Man's Land
