= Trembraze =

Hamlet in Cornwall, England

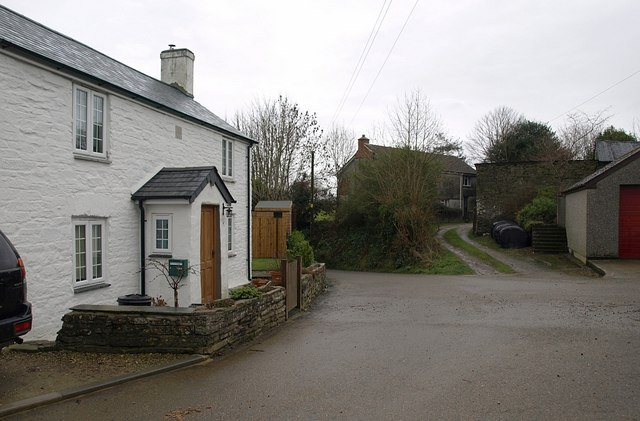
Trembraze

Trembraze is a hamlet north of Liskeard, Cornwall, England, United Kingdom.
