= Horningtops =

Hamlet in Cornwall, England

Coordinates: 50.422°N 4.435°W

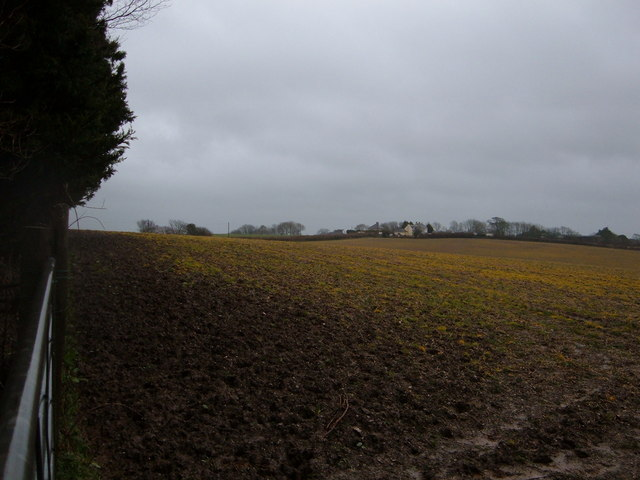
- View towards 'Horningtops'

- Location within Cornwall
- OS grid reference: SX271608
- Civil parish: St Keyne and Trewidland
- Unitary authority: Cornwall
- Ceremonial county: Cornwall
- Region: South West
- Country: England
- Sovereign state: United Kingdom
- Post town: Liskeard
- Postcode district: PL14 3

Horningtops is a hamlet south-southeast of Liskeard in east Cornwall, England in National Grid grid square SX2760. It is in the civil parish of St Keyne and Trewidland.

== Cornish wrestling ==
A Cornish wrestling tournament, was held at Great Trethew in Horningtops in 2017.
