= Trewidland =

Hamlet in Cornwall, England

Coordinates: 50.412°N 4.457°W

Trewidland: Cornish: Trewythelan
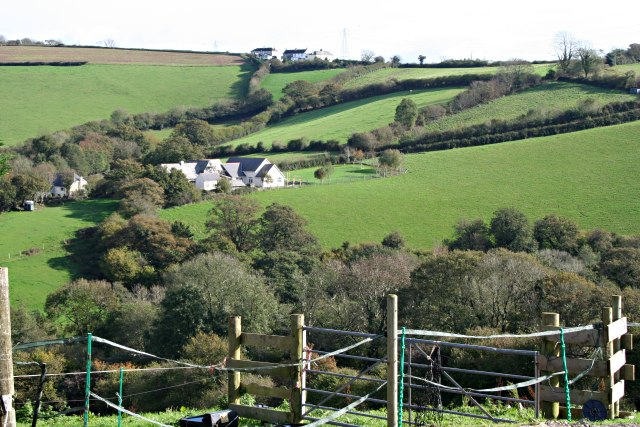
- A view north of Trewidland

- Location within Cornwall
- OS grid reference: SX255598
- Civil parish: St Keyne and Trewidland
- Unitary authority: Cornwall
- Ceremonial county: Cornwall
- Region: South West
- Country: England
- Sovereign state: United Kingdom
- Post town: Liskeard
- Postcode district: PL14
- Dialling code: 01503

Trewidland (Cornish: Trewythelan) is a hamlet in the civil parish of St Keyne and Trewidland, in east Cornwall, England. It is about 2 miles (3.2 km) northeast of Duloe. It is situated in the Looe Valley, part of the Cornwall National Landscape.

The village shop and post office closed some years ago, as did the two Methodist chapels. There is also no pub in the village. Most residents rely on the local market town of Liskeard, approximately 3 miles (4.8 km) away, for shopping and other local services. However, it does have a primary school, a village hall, and a snooker room.

Trewidland historically formed part of the ancient parish of Liskeard, but lay outside the town's borough boundaries. The parish was split along the borough boundary in 1866 into two civil parishes: "Liskeard" covering the part of the old parish outside the borough, and "Liskeard Borough" for the borough. The rural Liskeard parish was renamed Dobwalls and Trewidland in 1974. In 2021, the Trewidland area was transferred into St Keyne parish, which was renamed "St Keyne and Trewidland".
