= St Martin-by-Looe =

Parish in Cornwall, UK

Coordinates: 50.384°N 4.427°W

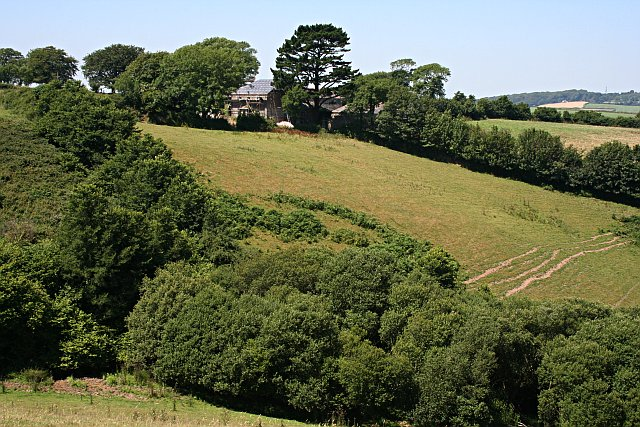
- Valley looking towards Bokenver Farm

- Location within Cornwall
- Population: 402 (Parish, 2021)
- Civil parish: St Martin-by-Looe
- Unitary authority: Cornwall
- Ceremonial county: Cornwall
- Region: South West
- Country: England
- Sovereign state: United Kingdom
- Post town: LOOE
- Postcode district: PL13
- UK Parliament: South East Cornwall

St Martin-by-Looe (Cornish: Penndrumm) is a coastal civil parish in south Cornwall, England, United Kingdom. The parish is immediately east of the town of Looe and 7 miles (11 km) south of Liskeard. The parish takes its name from its parish church of St Martin. The parish historically included East Looe, which was removed from the ecclesiastical parish in 1845 and became a separate civil parish in 1866. Further territory was ceded from the civil parish of St Martin in 1934 to the urban district of Looe, including the parish church and the small adjoining settlement of St Martin. Since 1934, the civil parish has therefore excluded the church and settlement after which it is named, instead just covering the more rural eastern parts of the old parish.

The main hamlets in the civil parish are Millendreath, which is on the coast just east of Looe, and No Man's Land a little way inland. To the north, the parish is bordered by Morval parish, to the east by Deviock parish, to the west by Looe parish and to the south by the English Channel. At the 2021 census the population of the parish was 402.

== Parish church ==
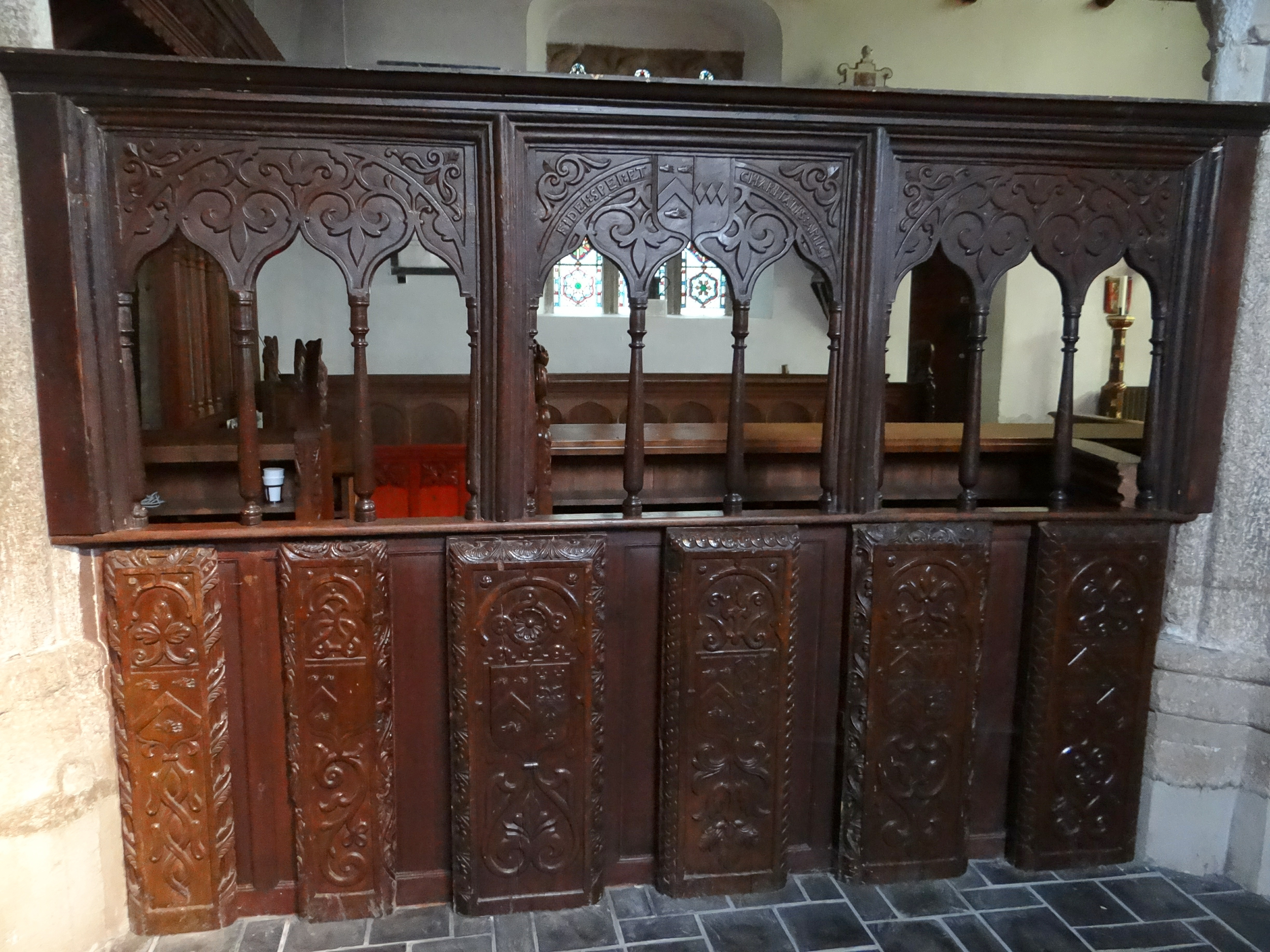
Screen at St Martin-by-Looe church by the Pinwill sisters

The parish church of St Martin stands outside the civil parish in the hamlet of St Martin at OS Grid Ref SX259550 about a mile north of Looe town centre. Its Norman doorway is built of Tartan Down stone and probably dates from about 1140. The interior of the church is of typically 15th-century appearance, but parts of the building are considerably older.

Thomas Bond, the topographer is buried in the churchyard. Jonathan Toup, classical scholar, was presented on 28 July 1750 to the rectory of St Martin and held it until his death in 1785.

A stone cross was found at Tregoad Farm in 1906 built into the wall of a stable. In 1931 it was set up on a new base at Tregoad by the Looe Old Cornwall Society. In 1971 it was removed to the Guildhall Museum in East Looe for preservation. It is a rare example in east Cornwall of a cross with a carved figure of Christ, in this case incised.

== Pendrym ==
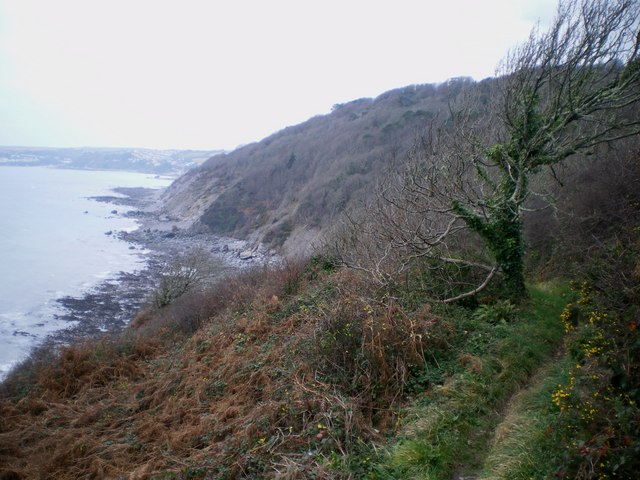
Bodigga Cliff from the coast path

The manor of Pendrim was a manor with lands in this parish and in others. It was recorded in the Domesday Book (1086) as having land for 6 ploughs, one virgate in lordship, one plough, 3 serfs, 13 smallholders with one plough, 200 acres of pasture and half a square league of woodland. It was held by King William and paid £3 by weight. Three lands from this manor had been taken from it and were then held by the canons of St Stephen's by Launceston from Robert, Count of Mortain; these were Bodigga, Bucklawren and Bonyalva. In these lands were 10 ploughs and the value was 20 shillings (formerly 40 shillings). The name is now spelled Pendrym and it is located close to the church of St Martin. The name is Cornish and means "ridge top" (drum = ridge; pen = top).

== Parish ==
There are two tiers of local government covering St Martin-by-Looe, at parish and unitary authority level: St Martin-by-Looe Parish Council and Cornwall Council. The parish council generally meets at the Memorial Hall in No Man's Land.

=== Administrative history ===
St Martin was an ancient parish in the West Wivelshire hundred of Cornwall. The parish was often known as St Martin-by-Looe to distinguish it from other parishes of the same name. The parish included the town of East Looe. A separate ecclesiastical parish of Looe (covering both East Looe and neighbouring West Looe) was created in 1845.

Parish responsibilities under the poor laws were administered separately for the area of the borough of East Looe and the rest of the parish of St Martin. They therefore became separate civil parishes in 1866, when the legal definition of 'parish' was changed to be the areas used for administering the poor laws. The civil parishes of East Looe and West Looe were brought together as a single urban district of Looe in 1898. The Looe Urban District was enlarged in 1934, taking territory from the civil parish of St Martin, including the area around the parish church and settlement of St Martin. The reduced civil parish of St Martin since 1934 has therefore just covered the more rural eastern parts of the old parish.

In 1996 the legal name of the parish was changed from St Martin to St Martin-by-Looe.
