= Moorswater =

Suburb of Liskeard, Cornwall, England

Coordinates: 50.451°N 4.486°W

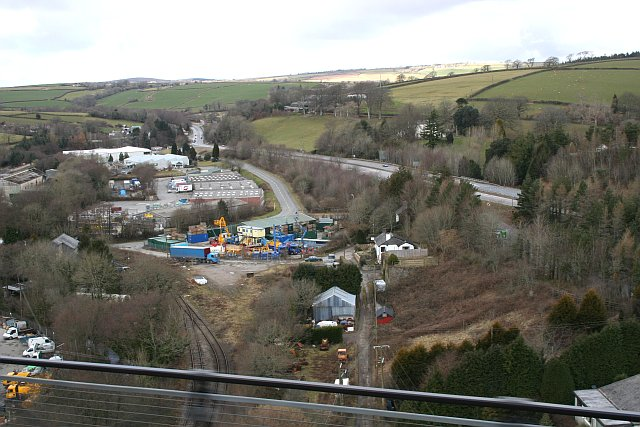
Moorswater industry seen from Moorswater railway viaduct

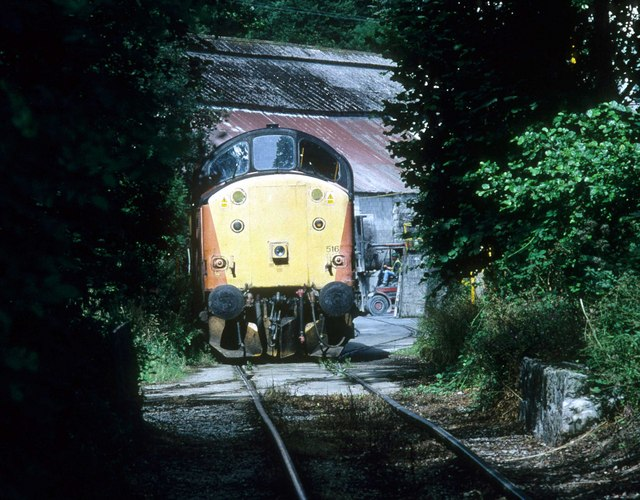
A Class 37 locomotive at Moorwater cement works in August 2000

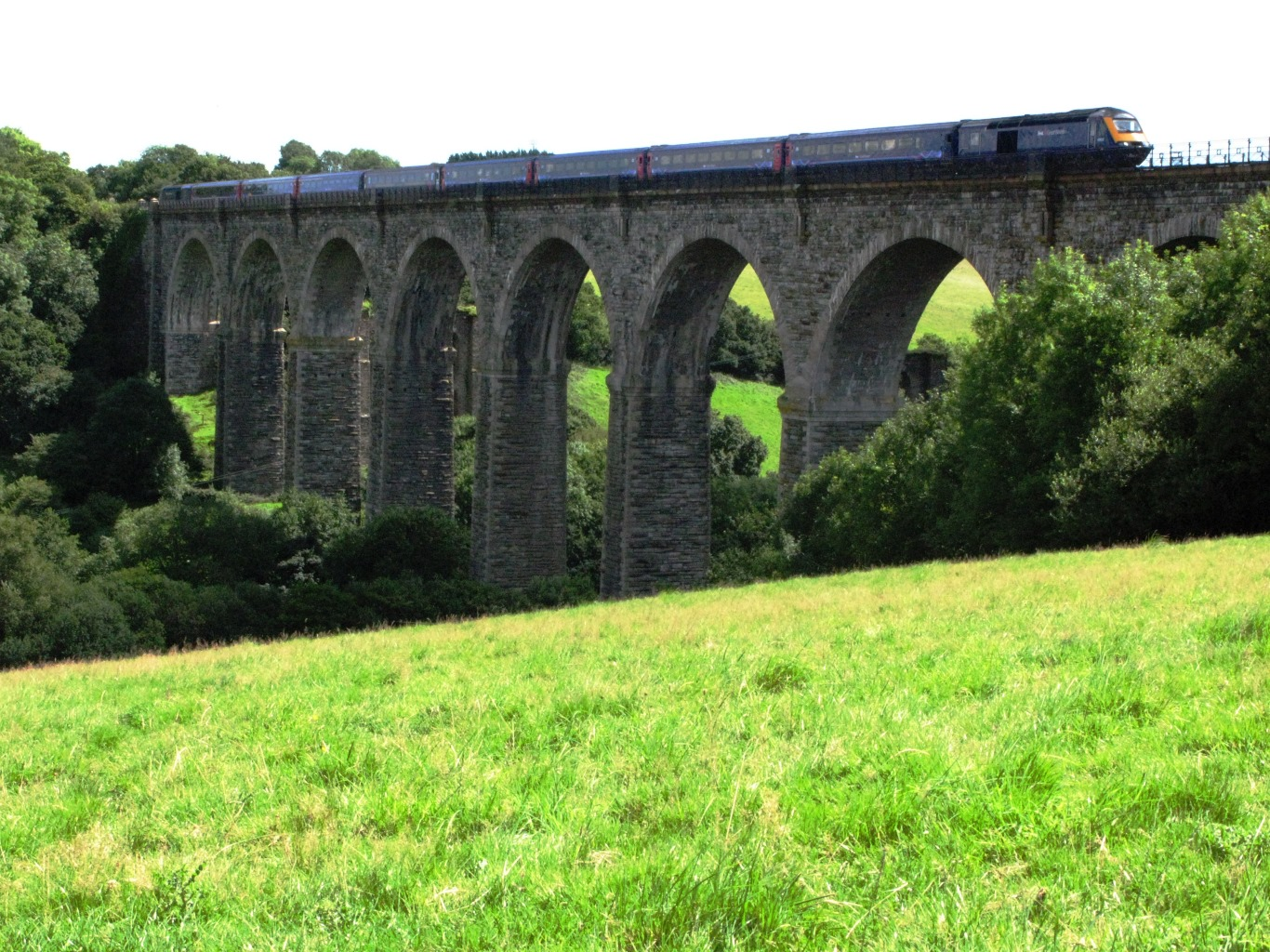
Moorswater viaduct carrying the Cornish Main Line railway

Moorswater is former hamlet and now an industrial suburb of Liskeard in Cornwall, England, United Kingdom. It is situated approximately half-a-mile (0.8 km) west of Liskeard town centre.

== History ==
The hamlet of Moorswater grew around the northern terminus of the Liskeard and Looe Union Canal in the early 1820s and has a long industrial history, lying south of the former mining area around Kit Hill and Caradon Hill at the southeast edge of Bodmin Moor. As industry developed, the village became the site of the Moorswater railway station, as the Liskeard and Caradon Railway mineral line replaced the canal. The hamlet expanded to include a number of cottages, a Free Methodist church, cafe and village shop.

== Demolition ==
The majority of the village, including the Methodist church, cafe, shop, cottages and railway buildings, was demolished in the 1960s and 1970s to make way for the A38 Liskeard Bypass. The site of the demolished part of the village is the slip road from the A38 with the village formerly joining the now cul-de-sac New Road. Some of the original village remains at the bottom of Old Road.

== Today ==
Moorswater lies in a valley which is spanned by Moorswater viaduct carrying the Cornish Main Line railway. The single-track Looe Valley Line branches from the main line at Liskeard railway station and descends into the valley allowing freights trains to access Moorswater Industrial Estate on the site of the former Moorswater railway station, once the centre of operations for the Liskeard and Caradon Railway.

The former china clay works at Moorswater is now a rail-served cement terminal.

== See also ==
- Moorswater viaduct
- Liskeard and Caradon Railway
- Moorswater railway station
- Liskeard and Caradon Railway
- Liskeard railway station
