= Dobwalls =

Village in Cornwall, England

Coordinates: 50.4577°N 4.5158°W

Dobwalls: Cornish: Fos an Mogh
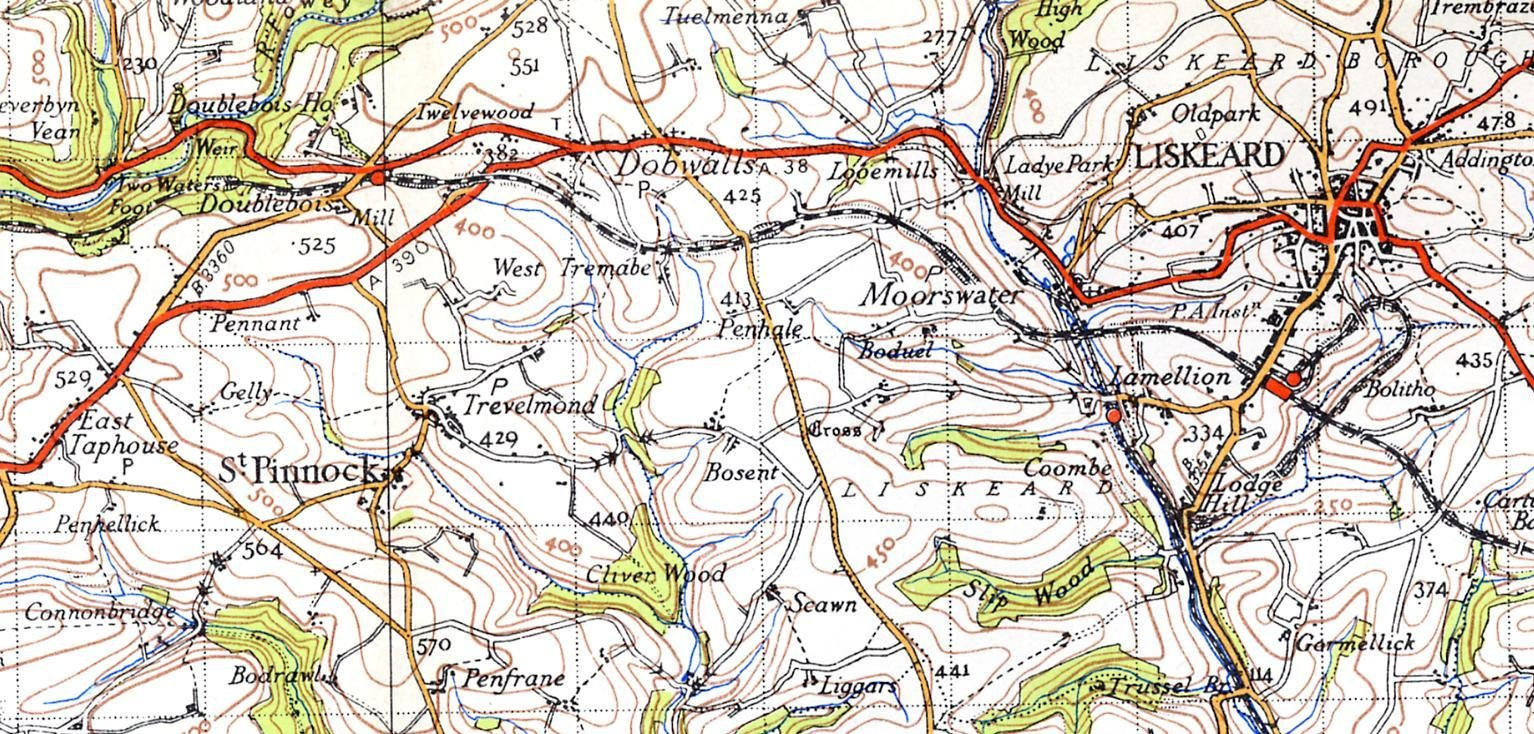
- Dobwalls and district from the 1940s Ordnance Survey Popular Edition One Inch to the Mile map.

- Location within Cornwall
- Population: 3,662 (2001 UK census)
- OS grid reference: SX215650
- Civil parish: Dobwalls
- Shire county: Cornwall
- Region: South West
- Country: England
- Sovereign state: United Kingdom
- Post town: LISKEARD
- Postcode district: PL14
- Dialling code: 01579
- Police: Devon and Cornwall
- Fire: Cornwall
- Ambulance: South Western
- UK Parliament: South East Cornwall

Dobwalls (Cornish: Fos an Mogh) is a village and civil parish in south-east Cornwall, England, United Kingdom. It is situated 3 mi (5 km) west of Liskeard.

The name is spelt Dubwalls on Bartholomew's map and Black's Guide of 1879.

The A38 trunk road ran through the village until the bypass was opened on 19 December 2008. The bypass has two of the most elaborate bat bridges built so far in the UK (previous examples in Wales being wooden posts with cables). Twelve native species of bats are found in the area.

Until 2006, the Dobwalls Adventure Park tourist attraction was located north of the village.

== Civil parish ==
At the 2011 census the population of the village was included in the civil parish of Dobwalls and Trewidland.

In 2020 Cornwall Council announced that from 1 April 2021 the part of Dobwalls and Trewidland parish surrounding the village of Trewidland would be moved to the parish of St Keyne, to form the new parish of St Keyne and Trewidland, with the remaining parish known as Dobwalls.
