= Menheniot =

Village in Cornwall, England

Coordinates: 50.440°N 4.412°W

Menheniot: Cornish: Mahynyes
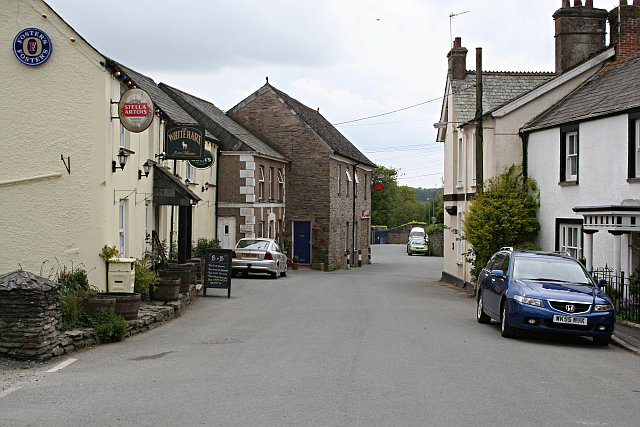
- Menheniot village

- Location within Cornwall
- Population: 1,716 (United Kingdom Census 2011 including Doddycross)
- OS grid reference: SX289628
- Civil parish: Menheniot
- Unitary authority: Cornwall
- Ceremonial county: Cornwall
- Region: South West
- Country: England
- Sovereign state: United Kingdom
- Post town: LISKEARD
- Postcode district: PL14
- Dialling code: 01579
- Police: Devon and Cornwall
- Fire: Cornwall
- Ambulance: South Western
- UK Parliament: South East Cornwall

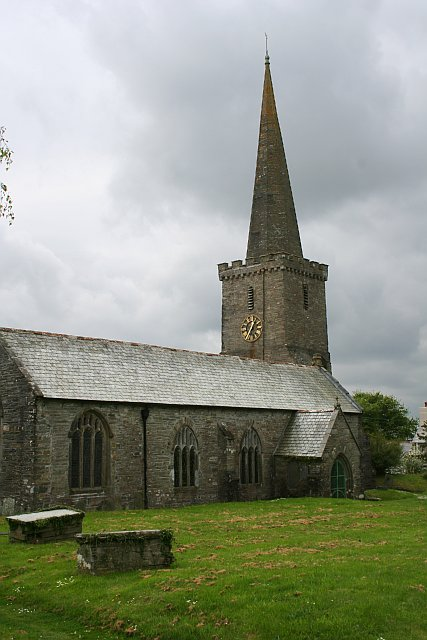
Menheniot parish church

Menheniot (Cornish: Mahynyes) is a civil parish and village in Cornwall, England, United Kingdom. The village is 2 1/2 miles (4.0 km) southeast of Liskeard. The meaning of the name is "sanctuary of Neot" (from minihi and Neot).

Menheniot had a population of 1,605 in the 2001 census. This increased slightly to 1,655 at the 2011 census, whereas the ward population at the same census was 3,658. The village has a primary school, a pub, a shop and a post office.

== Geography ==
To the south of the civil parish is Clicker Tor Quarry, a Site of Special Scientific Interest noted for its geological interest, containing one of the best examples of ultramafic rocks in South West England.

At Coldrennick was a black and white mansion dated 1870 by the architect C. F. Hayward but it was demolished c. 1950. This had replaced a house of 3 storeys and 10 bays built in the 18th century. At Merrymeet is an Anglican mission church dedicated to St Mary the Virgin.

== Parish church ==
The parish church, located in the village, is dedicated to St Lalluwy. It has a buttressed tower and a spire. The alleged dedications to St Antoninus and St Corentin derive from errors made by John Whitaker and George Oliver. The church is a fine building of the 14th century but has been rendered less interesting by unsympathetic restorations. Accounts of four guilds associated with the church have been preserved: they relate to part of the reigns of Mary I and Elizabeth I. The date of the parish feast was altered in 1405 from March 8 to October 6. In 1478 the benefice was appropriated to Exeter College, Oxford and the cure of souls became a vicarage. Five chapels in the parish are recorded in the Middle Ages but they were abolished at the Reformation. There was also a lazar house at Maudlin near Liskeard which did remain in existence for some time after. As a valuable benefice several of the incumbents have been men of some distinction, including William Wykeham in 1365, Peter Courtenay, afterwards Bishop of Exeter, in 1477, and John Moreman, 1529-54. Dr Moreman was the author of a commentary on the epistle to the Romans and also the first to teach his people the Lord's prayer, creed and ten commandments in English. George Hall became vicar of Menheniot and in 1641 archdeacon of Cornwall. He was deprived of his offices under the Commonwealth but became a bishop after the Restoration.

Features of interest include the ceiled wagon roofs, the pulpit (1891 by Harry Hems of Exeter), which depicts the polar exploits of Vice-Admiral Charles Trelawny Jago and the earliest monumental brass in Cornwall (commemorating Sir Ralph Carmynow, d. 1386). There are a number of interesting monuments to the Trelawnys, including Jonathan Trelawny (d. 1674) and Edward Trelawney, Dean of Exeter (d. 1726). The black marble slab to L. Stephens (d. 1724) and the tablet to Lady Charlotte Carr (by M. Eames of Exeter) are also of interest.

Captain John Richards Lapenotière, who lived in the parish until his death in 1834, is buried in the churchyard. He was the first person to bring news of the Battle of Trafalgar back to London.

== Economy and transport ==
Menheniot lies in a former mining area and is surrounded by disused shafts and engine houses. Lead seams were discovered in the 1840s and Menheniot became the centre of a mining boom which lasted until the 1870s. During this period the population doubled. Wheal Trelawney was a lead and arsenic mine which was worked from 1840 to 1890 and again in 1900-02.

The village has a station, Menheniot railway station, on the Cornish Main Line which is operated by Great Western Railway.

== Cornish wrestling ==
Cornish wrestling tournaments, for prizes, were held in Menheniot in the 1800s.

== See also ==
- Adrenalin Quarry
- Richard Gendall
