= Duloe, Cornwall =

Village in Cornwall, England

Coordinates: 50.400°N 4.488°W

Duloe: Cornish: Dewlogh
- Location within Cornwall
- Population: 712 (United Kingdom Census 2011)
- OS grid reference: SX 233 586
- Civil parish: Duloe
- Unitary authority: Cornwall
- Ceremonial county: Cornwall
- Region: South West
- Country: England
- Sovereign state: United Kingdom
- Post town: LISKEARD
- Postcode district: PL14
- Dialling code: 01503
- Police: Devon and Cornwall
- Fire: Cornwall
- Ambulance: South Western
- UK Parliament: South East Cornwall

Duloe (Cornish: Dewlogh (English 'Two Rivers')) is a village and civil parish in Cornwall, England, United Kingdom. It is situated about five miles (4.7 miles (8 km)) south of Liskeard. The village of Herodsfoot and the hamlets of Churchbridge, Highercliff, Milcombe, Tredinnick, Trefanny Hill, Tregarlandbridge and Tregarrick Mill are also in the parish. The manors of Brodbane, Trenant, Lanwarnick, Killigorick and Tremadart are mentioned in the Domesday Book (1086).

== Parish church ==
The Church of England parish church of Duloe is dedicated to St Cuby and St Leonard and was built in early medieval times. Its plan is unusual since the tower is at the end of the south transept. The tower is 13th century and an upper stage was added in the Perpendicular style. However this stage was removed in 1861. (There is now no access to the tower from the transept as the archway between was blocked up at an early date.)

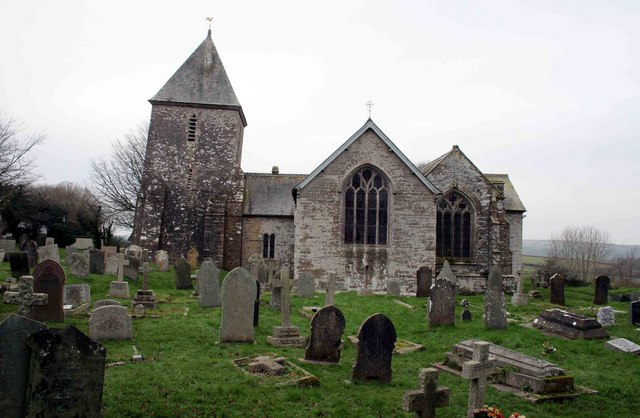
Church of St Cuby and St Leonard, Duloe

There is a north aisle which continues eastwards to form a chancel aisle which is grander in style (though the arches are lower) and was the family chapel of the Colshull family. There is a fine monument here of Sir John Colshull (d. 1483). The effigy of Sir John in full armour lies on a slab of elvan stone on top of a tomb chest ornamented with shields and at the west end a crucifixion. The parclose screen bears coats of arms connected with the Colshulls and may be made up of parts of a rood screen. Both inside and outside the family chapel is more highly ornamented than the rest of the church. Other monuments commemorate Ann Coffyn (d. 1592), John Killiow (d. 1601) and his wife (a tomb chest), Mary Arundell (d. 1629) with a curious epitaph comparing man to the laurel tree, and Henry Bewes (d. 1793). The Coffyn memorial shows her in Elizabethan dress and is of slate; another slate memorial is to two unknown wives and their children, also shown in Elizabethan dress. The Bewes memorial is by William Adron and shows a woman in relief. Church website www.stcubyduloe.org.uk

== Landmarks ==
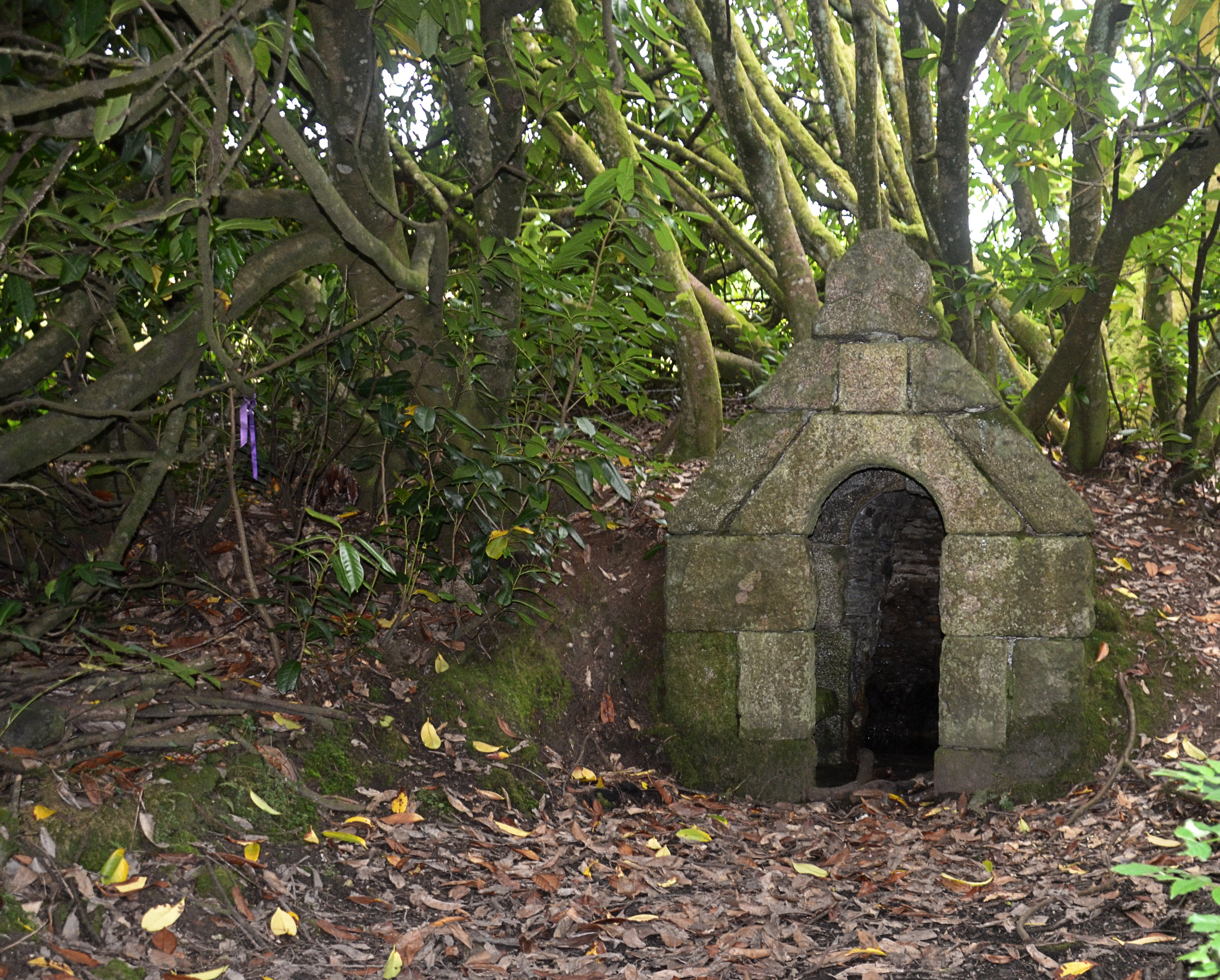
St Cuby's Well

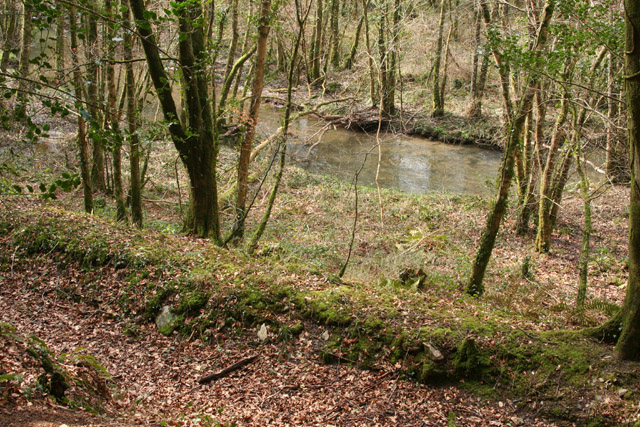
The West Looe River

The village has a primary school, Duloe Church of England Primary Academy.

St Cuby's Well is a holy well about half a mile east of the church. It is covered by a 19th-century wellhouse. It is listed Grade II.

Duloe stone circle is in a field behind a farm in the village.

== Cornish wrestling ==
In the early 20th century Cornish wrestling tournaments, for prizes, were held on the village green in Duloe.
