= Widegates =

Village in south-east Cornwall, England

Coordinates: 50.394°N 4.410°W

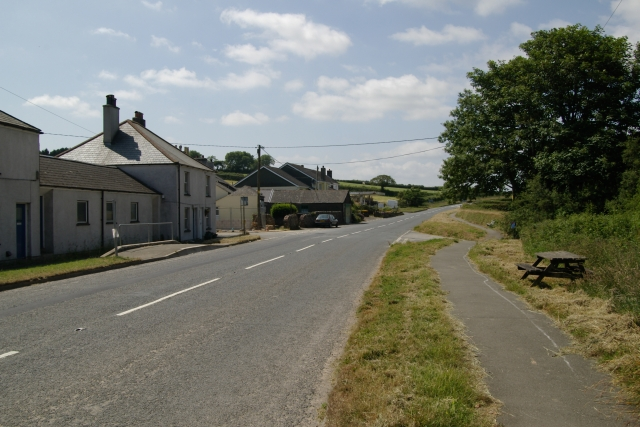
A387 road in Widegates

Widegates (Cornish: Porthledan) is a village in south-east Cornwall, England, UK, about 4 miles north of Looe. It is on the A387 road about two miles west of Hessenford.

The centre of the village lacks any sort of local amenity but there is a nearby farm shop on its outskirts. Widegates has a population of approximately 500.
