= St Keyne =

Village in east Cornwall, England

Coordinates: 50°25′N 4°28′W

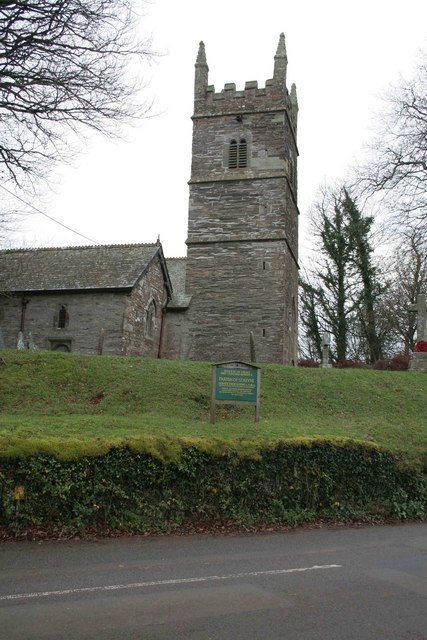
- St Keyne church

- Location within Cornwall
- Population: 795 (St Keyne and Trewidland parish, 2021)
- Civil parish: St Keyne and Trewidland
- Unitary authority: Cornwall
- Shire county: Cornwall
- Region: South West
- Country: England
- Sovereign state: United Kingdom
- Post town: LISKEARD
- Postcode district: PL14
- Dialling code: 01579

St Keyne (Cornish: Sen Keyn) is a village in Cornwall, England, United Kingdom. It lies to the south of Liskeard. The village is served by St Keyne Wishing Well Halt railway station. It is one of the two main settlements in the civil parish of St Keyne and Trewidland, the other being Trewidland. At the 2021 census the parish had a population of 795.

== Notable buildings ==
The church is dedicated to Saint Keyne, said to be one of the daughters of the legendary Welsh King Brychan. The church is of little architectural interest. The Perpendicular north aisle has probably been added to a church originally cruciform in plan (its windows however are Decorated, no doubt reused). The west tower is of three storeys and without buttresses.

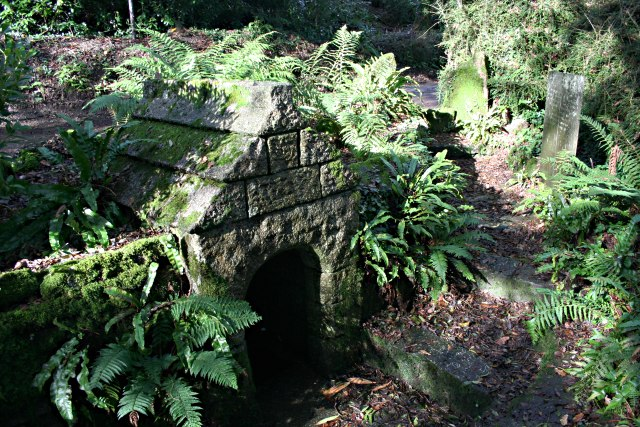
St Keyne's Well

St Keyne's well is a holy well dedicated to Saint Keyne, located about 0.6 miles (1 km) southeast of the village. A small housing was built over the well in the 16th century, this was rebuilt in the 1930s. The ballad The Well of St Keyne was written by the poet Robert Southey (1774–1843). In Victorian times St Keyne's well had the reputation of conferring supremacy to the marriage partner who first tasted it. ("The quality, that man and wife / Whose chance, or choice, attaines / First of this sacred stream to drinke / Thereby the mastery gains.")

Lametton Mill, designed as a Grade II listed building in 1985, dates from the 17th century. The property sold in March 2018 for £235,000. In 2022 it was the subject of a restoration featured in Channel 4's Grand Designs.

== Governance ==
There are two tiers of local government covering St Keyne and Trewidland, at parish and unitary authority level: St Keyne and Trewidland Parish Council and Cornwall Council. The parish council meets at both Trewidland Village Hall and St Keyne Village Hall.

St Keyne was an ancient parish. In 2021 the parish was enlarged to take in Trewidland and surrounding areas, which had historically formed part of the parish of Liskeard, and had then been part of the parish of Dobwalls and Trewidland between 1974 and 2021. At the same time as the parish's enlargement in 2021, it was renamed "St Keyne and Trewidland". The change increased the area of the parish by more than a factor of three.
