= Eliot (surname) =

Eliot is a surname, and may refer to:

- Abigail Adams Eliot (1892–1992), American educator
- Alexander Eliot (1919–2015), American writer
- Andrew Eliot (1718–1778), American Congregational minister
- Charles Eliot (diplomat) (1862–1931), British diplomat, colonial administrator and botanist
- Charles Eliot (landscape architect) (1859–1897), American landscape architect
- Charles William Eliot (1834–1926), American educator and President of Harvard University
- Charles William John Eliot (1928–2008), Canadian academic and university administrator
- Charles W. Eliot II (1899–1993), American landscape architect
- Charlotte Champe Eliot (1843–1929), American school teacher, poet, biographer and social worker
- Clara Eliot (1896–1976), American economist
- D. J. Eliot (Darin Eliot) (born 1976), American football coach
- Daniel Eliot (1646–1702), English politician
- Darren Eliot (born 1961), Canadian ice hockey player and sports broadcaster
- Edward Eliot (born 1618) (1618–c.1710), English politician
- Edward Eliot (priest) (1864–1943), Anglican Archdeacon
- Edward Carlyon Eliot (1870–1940), British colonial administrator
- Edward James Eliot (1758–1797), English Member of Parliament
- Edward John Eliot (1782–1863), English soldier
- Edward Eliot, 3rd Earl of St Germans (1798–1877), British politician
- Edward Craggs-Eliot, 1st Baron Eliot (1727–1804), English official and politician
- Francis Perceval Eliot (1755–1818), English soldier, auditor and man of letters
- George Eliot (1819–1880), pseudonym of the English novelist with birth name Mary Ann Evans
- Gideon Eliot (1664–1713), Scottish surgeon
- Granville Eliot, 7th Earl of St Germans (1867–1942), English peer
- Henry Eliot (author), British author
- Henry Ware Eliot (1843–1919), American industrialist and philanthropist
- Henry Eliot, 5th Earl of St Germans (1835–1911), English peer
- Hugh Eliot (1921–1945), Royal Air Force flying ace of World War II
- Hugh Eliot (explorer) (c.1470–c.1535), English merchant
- Ida M. Eliot (1839–1923), American writer, educator, philosopher and entomologist
- Jacquetta Eliot, Countess of St Germans (born 1943), English society beauty
- Jago Eliot (1966–2006), British arts organiser
- Jan Eliot (born 1950), American cartoonist
- Jared Eliot (1685–1763), American colonial scientist, minister and physician
- Jim Eliot, English songwriter
- John Eliot (fl.1562–1593), English author and translator of the Ortho-epia Gallica
- John Eliot (died 1685) (1612–1685), English politician
- John Eliot (meteorologist) (1839–1908), English mathematician and meteorologist
- John Eliot (missionary) (1604–1690), English "Apostle to the Indians" in Massachusetts
- John Eliot (Royal Navy officer) (1742–1769), British naval officer and governor of West Florida
- John Eliot (statesman) (1592–1632), English politician imprisoned in the Tower of London
- John Nevill Eliot (1912–2003), English entomologist
- John Eliot, 1st Earl of St Germans (1761–1823), British politician
- John Eliot, 6th Earl of St Germans (1890–1922), British peer and army officer
- Sir John Eliot, 1st Baronet (1736–1786), Scottish physician
- John Eliot, 1st Earl of St Germans (1761–1823), British politician
- Lise Eliot, American neuroscientist
- Louis Eliot (born 1968), English singer, songwriter and guitarist
- Margaret Eliot (1914–2011), English music teacher and musician
- Martha May Eliot (1891–1978), American pediatrician
- Montague Eliot, 8th Earl of St Germans (1870–1960), British peer and courtier
- Nicholas Eliot, 9th Earl of St Germans (1914–1988), British peer
- Peregrine Eliot, 10th Earl of St Germans (1941–2016), British peer
- Peter Eliot (1910–1995), English Anglican priest, Archdeacon of Worcester
- Philip Eliot (bishop) (1862–1946), British Anglican cleric, Bishop of Buckingham
- Philip Eliot (priest) (1835–1917), English Anglican cleric, Dean of Windsor
- Ray Eliot (1905–1980), American football and baseball player, coach and college athletics administrator
- Richard Eliot (1694–1748), British diplomat, official and politician
- Richard Eliot (MP for St. Germans) (c.1546–1609), English Member of Parliament
- Robin Eliot (1942–2017), English cricketer and race horse owner
- Samuel Eliot (banker) (1739–1820), American banker and businessman
- Samuel Eliot (historian) (1821–1898), American historian, educator and politician
- Samuel Atkins Eliot Jr. (1893–1984), American writer and academic
- Samuel Atkins Eliot (politician) (1798–1862), American politician from Massachusetts
- Samuel A. Eliot (minister) (Samuel Atkins Eliot II) (1862–1950), American Unitarian minister
- Simon Eliot, British academic
- Sonny Eliot (1920–2012), American meteorologist, actor and comedian
- Theodore L. Eliot Jr. (Theodore Lyman Eliot Jr.) (1928–2019), American diplomat
- Thomas Lamb Eliot (1841–1936), American minister in Oregon
- Thomas D. Eliot (Thomas Dawes Eliot) (1808–1870), American politician from Massachusetts
- Thomas H. Eliot (Thomas Hopkinson Eliot) (1907–1991), American lawyer, politician and academic from Massachusetts
- T. S. Eliot (Thomas Stearns Eliot) (1888–1965), British-American poet and author
- Valerie Eliot (1926–2012), surviving second wife of T. S. Eliot
- William Eliot (MP) (c.1586–1650), English politician
- William Greenleaf Eliot (1811–1887), American educator, Unitarian minister and civic leader in Missouri
- William Havard Eliot (1796–1831), American architect and builder
- William Eliot, 2nd Earl of St Germans (1767–1845), British peer, diplomat and politician
- William Eliot, 4th Earl of St Germans (1829–1881), British diplomat
- Winslow Eliot (born 1956), American novelist and nonfiction writer

== See also ==
- Elliot (surname)
