= Literary property =

Intellectual property right

Literary property is a common law form of intellectual property that protects an author's creative rights in their work. The concept has been traced back to John Milton's April 1667 publication contract for Paradise Lost with Samuel Simmons.

== See also ==
- Copyright
- Moral rights
- Personality rights

== Sources ==
- Feather, John (2020). "Copyright and the Creation of Literary Property". In Eliot, Simon; Rose, Jonathan (eds.). A Companion to the History of the Book. Blackwell Companions to Literature and Culture no. 102. Vol. 2 (2nd ed.). Hoboken, N.J.: Wiley Blackwell. pp. 743–757. doi:10.1002/9781119018193.ch49. ISBN 978-1-119-01817-9.
- Ng, Alina (October 2012). "Literary Property and Copyright". Articles. Northwestern Journal of Technology and Intellectual Property. 10 (7): 531–577. Archived from the original on 1 March 2024 – via Mississippi College School of Law Digital Commons.
- Rodzvilla, John (2020). "Literary Property". In Merskin, Debra L. (ed.). The Sage International Encyclopedia of Mass Media and Society. Vol. 5. Thousand Oaks, Cal.: Sage Publications. pp. 965–968. doi:10.4135/9781483375519.n372. ISBN 978-1-483-37551-9.
