= Richard Elliott =

Richard Elliot(t) may refer to:

== Politicians ==
- Richard N. Elliott (1873–1948), U.S. Representative from Indiana
- Dick Elliott (politician) (1935–2014), American politician from South Carolina
- Richard Elliott (North Carolina politician), American state representative in 1874
- Richard Eliot
- Richard Eliot (MP for St. Germans)

== Musicians ==
- Richard Elliott (organist), principal organist of the Mormon Tabernacle Choir
- Richard Elliot (born 1960), Scottish-born saxophone player

== Others ==
- Richard M. Elliot (1888–1918), American naval officer killed in World War I
- Richard M. Elliott (1887–1969), American psychologist
- Dick Elliott (1886–1961), American character actor
- Ricky Elliott (born 1965), American racing driver

== See also ==
- Dickey Elliott, South African cricketer
- the wayward son (1614–85) of Sir John Eliot (1592–1632), see John Eliot (statesman)#Richard Eliot
