= Jago Eliot =

English arts worker (1966–2006)

Jago Nicholas Aldo Eliot
- Born: 24 March 1966; Plymouth, Devon, England
- Died: 15 April 2006 (aged 40); Molenick, Cornwall, England
- Title: Lord Eliot
- Spouse: Bianca Ciambriello
- Children: Albert Eliot; Ruby Eliot; Violet Eliot
- Relatives: Brothers: Louis Eliot; Francis Michael Eliot

Jago Nicholas Aldo Eliot, Lord Eliot (24 March 1966 – 15 April 2006) was the son of Peregrine Eliot, 10th Earl of St Germans, and Jacquetta Eliot, Countess of St Germans (née Lampson).

== Biography ==
In 1988, on the death of his grandfather, he became styled Lord Eliot. He was educated at Millfield School.

Eliot was an early collaborator with Eddie Izzard at Covent Garden as a busker, he then moved to Brighton in the late 1980s where he promoted a number of nights at the ZAP club, including Fundamental and Pow Wow. He returned to Cornwall in the mid-1990s and in 2002 founded the Port Eliot Literature Festival, an annual event held in the grounds of the house.

Eliot worked with digital and creative projects, either with the Arts Council or the Port Eliot Literary Festival, and London Arts projects. Shortly before his death, Eliot had been awarded an Artist Fellowship in Creative Technology by Hewlett-Packard and was exploring invisible sculpture and 3D soundscapes.

He also began to develop strategies to ensure Port Eliot would continue to be a vibrant cultural laboratory, building on the legend of the Elephant Fayre and helping define the ethos of the Port Eliot Literary Festival, through conversations with friends such as Tom Hodgkinson of the Idler magazine. His passion for the arts saw him also involved with the A Foundation, through his Literati project and i-DAT with the A Conversation at Port Eliot in 2006. This was the first in a proposed series on emerging ideas in art, science and technology organised by Jago Eliot and The Institute of Digital Art and Technology at the University of Plymouth. The themes for this seminar were 'art and irrationality' and 'a geography of the immaterial'.

== Marriage & children ==
Eliot married former model Bianca Ciambriello. The couple were first "married" in the "Lost Vagueness" garden at the Glastonbury Festival, before a more formal ceremony at Port Eliot, the seat of the Eliot family. The alternative wedding is featured in Julian Temple's 2006 film Glastonbury. They had one son and twin daughters.

== Death ==
Eliot died on 15 April 2006. He was determined to have died from epilepsy, which he had developed in 2004.
