= Simon Elliot =

Simon Elliot or Simon Eliot or Simon Elliott may refer to:

- Simon Elliot, alleged ISIL leader according to conspiracy theories in the Arab world
- Simon Eliot (fl. 2007), English historian
- Simon Elliott (born 1974), New Zealand football manager
- Simon G. Elliott (1828–1897), American surveyor
