= Neon & Ghost Signs =

Studio album by Rialto
- Released: 25 April 2025
- Genres: Alternative rock; britpop
- Length: 36:59
- Label: Fierce Panda Records
- Producers: Tam Johnstone, Louis Eliot

Rialto chronology
Night on Earth (2001)	Neon & Ghost Signs (2025)

Singles from Neon & Ghost Signs
- 1. "No One Leaves This Discotheque Alive" Released: 13 January 2025; 2. "Car That Never Comes" Released: 12 February 2025; 3. "Remembering Me Forget" Released: 19 March 2025; 4. "Neon & Ghost Signs" Released: 14 April 2025

Neon & Ghost Signs is the third studio album by English rock band Rialto. It was released in 2025, their first new album in 24 years, after 2001's Night on Earth. It was announced alongside new tour dates, including an intimate show at Scala in London on 14 May 2025. It peaked at 60 on the UK official album sales charts, and was positively received. The first single "No One Leaves This Discotheque Alive" became a hit in the CIS, peaked #21 in radio charts (as well #14 in Russia and #11 in Kazakhstan).

An expanded version of the album was released on 19th June 2026 which included 8 bonus tracks.

== Background ==
The album was inspired by a near death experience that lead singer Louis Eliot had several years prior in Spain, when he had been rushed to hospital. It was also preceded by Eliot's long-term relationship coming to an end, leading to him returning to London and it's late-night entertainment.

== Reception ==
Professional ratings
Review scores
Source	Rating
MusicOMH	4/5 stars
Record Collector	4/5 stars
Uncut	4/5 stars
Cult Following	4/5 stars

The album received generally positive reviews. Ewan Gleadow of Cult Following described the release as an "unexpected return", calling the lead single, "No One Leaves This Discotheque Alive" a "confident, booming instrumental", comparing it to Leonard Cohen's Death of a Ladies' Man era. Michael Hubbard of MusicOMH suggested that there was "much here to enjoy" in the album; stating it made a "convincing case" of being "by some margin, the best Rialto album yet", and compared the lead single's chorus to Kylie Minogue's Can't Get You Out Of My Head.

== Track listing ==
All tracks are written by Frederick Macpherson, Louis Eliot, Tam Johnstone.

Neon & Ghost Signs track listing
No.	Title	Length
1.	"No One Leaves This Discotheque Alive"	3:31
2.	"I Want You"	3:38
3.	"Neon & Ghost Signs"	3:44
4.	"Taking the Edge Off Me"	3:24
5.	"Remembering To Forget"	3:51
6.	"Car That Never Comes"	3:22
7.	"Sandpaper Kisses"	4:02
8.	"Cherry"	3:14
9.	"Put You on Hold"	3:23
10.	"Gone"	4:28
Total length:		36:59

Neon & Ghost Signs (Deluxe Edition) track listing
No.	Title	Length
11.	"The One You Love"	3:15
12.	"Paper Doll"	3:39
13.	"No One Leaves This Discotheque Alive (Sunglasses For Jaws Version)"	3:47
14.	"Taking The Edge Off Me (House Of Bamboo Version)"	4:11
15.	"Car That Never Comes (Toe Rag Version)"	3:03
16.	"No One Leaves This Discotheque Alive (Lex Wolf Remix)"	7:03
17.	"No One Leaves This Discotheque Alive (Goff Remix)"	5:35
18.	"No One Leaves This Discotheque Alive (Dan Donovan Remix)"	4:53
Total length:		72:33
