= Seltaeb =

Beatles merchandising company

Seltaeb (US) Stramsact (UK)
- A poster advertising products for sale; licensed by Seltaeb
- Type: Merchandising
- Industry: Merchandising
- Founded: 1963
- Headquarters: New York
- Area served: International
- Key people: Nicky Byrne, Lord Peregrine Eliot, Mark Warman, Simon Miller-Munday, John Fenton, and Malcolm Evans
- Products: Beatle dolls, scarves, mugs, bath water, wigs, badges, T-shirts, bubble gum, licorice, empty cans of 'Beatle Breath', and many more
- Parent: NEMS Enterprises: Brian Epstein (b. 19 September 1934, d. 27 August 1967) and lawyer David Jacobs (b. 1912, d. 15 December 1968)
- Subsidiaries: Stramsact

Seltaeb was a company set up in 1963 by Nicky Byrne (né Douglas Anthony Nicholas Byrne) to exclusively look after merchandising interests on behalf of Brian Epstein, who managed NEMS Enterprises and the Beatles.

Directly prior to the Beatles' first American visit, Brian Epstein wanted someone to manage the escalating volume of merchandising requests that NEMS found itself unable to cope with, and asked his lawyer, David Jacobs, to oversee this task. Jacobs knew Nicky Byrne and asked him if he would be interested in taking over the merchandising subdivision from NEMS altogether, paying NEMS a commission. Byrne accepted the offer subject to a 90% rate, leaving only 10% for the Beatles and NEMS combined. Completely unaware of the potential market that existed, particularly in the United States, Epstein agreed to the deal, and subsequently lost the Beatles an estimated $100,000,000 in possible income.

In December 1963, Byrne took over the control of Stramsact in the UK, and then set up Seltaeb (Beatles spelt backwards) in the United States. Epstein was able to renegotiate a more favourable commission of 49% in August 1964, but then became embroiled in a three-year court battle with Byrne regarding payment of monies due, during which time potential sponsors lost interest. In August 1967 Epstein died, from what was ruled an accidental overdose of a prescribed drug. Jacobs was found hanged in his garage on 15 December 1968. Byrne later retired to the Bahamas.

== Merchandising ==
Before the Beatles achieved nationwide success in Britain, Epstein had permitted a small company (run by his cousins, and which initially catered only to fan club members) to produce Beatles' sweaters for 30 shillings and badges for sixpence, eventually selling 15,000 sweaters and 50,000 badges as the Beatles' popularity grew. When Beatlemania stormed the UK in 1963, Epstein was besieged by novelty goods companies wanting to use the Beatles' name and images on plastic guitars, drums, disc racks, badges, belts and a huge variety of assorted merchandise. Epstein was adamant that the Beatles would not directly endorse any product, but through NEMS Enterprises he would grant discretionary licences to companies who were able to produce a quality product at a fair price, although many companies were already selling products without a licence.

When NEMS was swamped with offers of endorsements from the United States following the success of "I Want to Hold Your Hand", Epstein, who was usually meticulous in matters involving the Beatles, decided to delegate this responsibility as he felt it was distracting him from his main task of managing his expanding roster of artists. He then asked Jacobs, his London-based celebrity lawyer who lived in Hove (Jacobs's other clients included Liberace, Marlene Dietrich, Diana Dors, Judy Garland, Zsa Zsa Gabor, Laurence Harvey, the Rolling Stones, Laurence Olivier, and Stephen Ward of the Profumo affair). to appoint someone specifically to take over the assignment and gave Jacobs power of attorney in the matter. Jacobs at first handed the daily management of this to his chief clerk, Edward Marke, but it transpired that Marke knew almost nothing about the merchandising business, and so Jacobs was forced to look elsewhere.

Jacobs knew of a Chelsea socialite, a 37-year-old divorcé called Nicky Byrne, and when encountering him at a friend's cocktail party offered him the project, saying that "Brian [Epstein] has made a terrible mess out of this [merchandising]." Byrne, who has said he had been "sitting around doing nothing for half of 1963" was an ex-Horse Guard trooper and amateur racing driver. He had also previously been involved in music publishing, clothes design, theatre production, managing the Condor club in London, and was also known as being a part of a group of people who called themselves "The King's Road Rats". He had not had any previous experience of merchandising or managing a large business.

Byrne was at first reluctant but later agreed, and delivered the merchandising contract to Jacobs's office on 4 December 1963, leaving blank the percentages. Jacobs asked Byrne what percentage rate he should write down to which Byrne ambiguously replied: "Oh, look, just put in 10%." A typical percentage would have been 75% or 80% for NEMS, and Byrne expected Epstein would begin to negotiate. However, the contract came back initialled (meaning Epstein had read it) and signed by Epstein and Jacobs. Jacobs's advice to Epstein was, "10% is better than nothing". This lapse of shrewdness set the scene for what would later become a legal battleground which deprived the Beatles and Brian Epstein of such large sums of money they would have easily overshadowed any royalties they would receive in the medium term from the sale of records. Byrne later said: "They couldn't wait to get somebody else to do this, because they were in a mess themselves." Epstein would later realise that he had made a colossal error of judgment, as Byrne charged 10% commission to the merchandisers for a licence (receiving $10 out of every hundred) and then giving 10% of that to NEMS, which was $1.

A Beatles' badge, licensed by the Seltaeb company

Byrne controlled two companies: Stramsact in the UK and Europe, and Seltaeb in the United States. He invited five friends to become partners — four of whom were unknown to either Jacobs or Epstein — with each investing around $1,600. They were: Mark Warman, Simon Miller-Munday, John Fenton (a business acquaintance of Jacobs), Peregrine Eliot (heir to the ninth Earl of St Germans) and Malcolm Evans (not to be confused with Mal Evans, the Beatles' roadie).

During the first Beatles' flight to the United States, Epstein was offered numerous samples of products by merchandisers who required a licence to be allowed to sell them such as clocks, pens, plastic wigs, bracelets, and games. Epstein rejected all of them; directing the merchandisers to Byrne instead, who was already in New York ensconced in The Drake Hotel on Park Avenue at 56th Street. Byrne rented expensive offices on Fifth Avenue, hiring two limousines (on 24-hour standby) and a helicopter to fly clients to and from the airport, insisting that only the presidents of merchandising companies were allowed to talk directly with him, or with his partner, Lord Eliot, who helped to promote the company name with use of his title. Eliot would later recall going to the Seltaeb office once or twice a week to draw $1,000 from petty cash.

The Wall Street Journal predicted that American teenagers would spend $50 million during 1964, on wigs, dolls, egg cups, T-shirts, sweatshirts and narrow-legged pants, and The New York Times wrote that the Reliance Manufacturing Company's factories were "smoking night and day ... to meet demand", and had already sold products valued at the retail value of $2.5 million. The Reliant Shirt Corporation paid $100,000 for a licence and sold over a million Beatle T-shirts in three days, Remco Toys had produced 100,000 Beatles' dolls and had orders for another 500,000, and the Lowell Toy Corporation were selling Beatle wigs faster than they could produce them, at more than 35,000 per day.

Seltaeb licensed over 150 different items internationally: Beatle dolls, scarves, mugs, bath water, wigs, T-shirts, bubble gum, liquorice, empty cans of "Beatle Breath", badges, and many more. The badges had "Seltaeb 1964 Chicago Made in USA" on one side, and "Green Duck Co., Chicago Made in USA" on the other. (The Green Duck metal stamping company was based at 1520 West Montana, Chicago, operating from 1906 until the late 1960s, making election badges for politicians, as well as memorial spoons). American businessmen saw the Beatles' merchandising as the "biggest marketing opportunity since Walt Disney created Mickey Mouse". The Columbia Pictures Corporation offered to buy Byrne's share in the companies for $500,000, with the incentives that the money would be paid into a low-tax offshore bank account in the Bahamas, Byrne and his partners would retain 50% control of the companies, and Ferrari cars would be given free to every partner, but Byrne turned down the offer.

=== Percentages and court cases ===
Byrne passed on the first cheque for $9,700 (US$100,695 in 2025 dollars) to Epstein, who was impressed, but after innocently asking how much out of the amount Byrne was owed, was told, "Nothing Brian, that's your 10%". Byrne then went on to describe the massive amount of interest he was getting from companies across the United States. Epstein was horrified, realising he had made an appalling error by accepting such a small percentage, and decided he could never tell the Beatles. He immediately instructed Jacobs to re-negotiate the contract with Byrne, which was finally achieved seven months later, in August 1964, which raised the royalty to 49%.

In The Times on 9 December 1964, it was reported that Eliot was suing Byrne for damages of $1 million (US$10,380,901 in 2025 dollars). Eliot accused Byrne of spending $150,000 for his "personal comfort and benefit", over some months. The suit also accused Byrne of charging hotel bills to Seltaeb, which were as much as $19,000 every week for girlfriends, and also opening "charge accounts for them in Fifth Avenue shops". Eliot also alleged that Byrne had hired a chauffeur for $700 a week and had withheld $55,000 in royalties to NEMS, after which NEMS had said they would cancel the agreement between the two companies unless monies were forthcoming. Byrne denied all the charges, but admitted he had hired a chauffeur, as he was not familiar with the streets of New York. A supreme court judge reserved his decision.

Epstein accused Seltaeb of not accounting properly, and cancelled its power to grant licences, which started a counter-lawsuit by Byrne against Epstein's New York accountant, Walter Hofer, asking for $5,168,000 in damages (US$53,648,498 in 2025 dollars). Epstein then instructed NEMS employees to deal directly with American companies, so Byrne instigated court proceedings, which took three years to settle, as it entailed 39 individual claims against NEMS. Byrne won the case, and Epstein paid the court costs and legal bills himself, although the judgement was later vacated (rendered null and void). Due to the legal battle, Woolworth's, Penney's, and other companies refused to finalise any merchandising agreements, cancelling orders worth $78 million. The court case and its effect was estimated to have lost NEMS and the Beatles approximately $100,000,000.

== Maximus Enterprises ==
Epstein, in 1967, launched Maximus Enterprises Ltd., to try to capitalise on the merchandising boom, but as so many companies had withdrawn their interest in the wake of the Seltaeb fiasco, and John Lennon had angered many people in America's Bible Belt with his remark that the Beatles were "more popular than Jesus", the opportunity had passed. Epstein feared that the Beatles would not renew their contracts with him—due to expire in the autumn of 1967—if they discovered the truth about Seltaeb. Epstein's problems with Seltaeb would remain with him until his death on 27 August 1967, from what was ruled an accidental overdose of a prescribed drug. Many investors had also missed out on massive profits following the cancelling of contracts, and Byrne would later claim of having received two mysterious phone calls foretelling of Epstein's death. Jacobs was found hanged in his garage on 15 December 1968. Days before his death Jacobs had asked for police protection, telling a private detective, "I'm in terrible trouble, they're all after me," and going on to list six well-known showbusiness people. Byrne retired to the Bahamas on his yacht, later moving to the Trowbridge area of Wiltshire.

== Aftermath ==
At the time, few managers of pop groups recognized the income potential of music merchandising, since so few artists remained popular long enough to justify such investment. For Brian Epstein, merchandising was simply a matter of good public relations, and any revenue generated from Beatles-branded products was seen only as a supplement to the band's earnings from live performances and record sales. He failed to recognize the scale of an industry that had already grossed $20 million for Elvis Presley in 1957 alone. According to Epstein's assistant, Alistair Taylor, financial mistakes were inevitable: "We did our best; some people have said it wasn't good enough. That's easy to say with 20/20 hindsight but remember that there were no rules. We were making it up as we went along."

While in the United States, Epstein met prominent divorce lawyer Nat Weiss, later asking him to oversee the Beatles' and NEMS' merchandising affairs. Weiss would recall: "The reality is that the Beatles never saw a penny out of the merchandising ... Tens of millions of dollars went down the drain because of the way the whole thing was mishandled. Even after the judgement was vacated, you could smell the smoke from the ashes, that's how badly they had been burned."

The Beatles themselves expressed regret. Lennon reflected: "On the business end he [Epstein] ripped us off on the Seltaeb thing." Paul McCartney similarly noted: "He [Epstein] looked to his dad for business advice, and his dad knew how to run a furniture store in Liverpool."

Despite the mismanagement, Beatles memorabilia originally licensed through Seltaeb remain in circulation today, sold at Beatles conventions and online.
