= Rialto (album) =

Studio album by Rialto
- Released: 14 April 1998
- Genre: Britpop; Alternative rock
- Length: 48:11
- Label: East West, China
- Producer: Jonny Bull, Stephen Hague

Rialto chronology
| Rialto (1998) | Night on Earth (2001) |

Singles from Rialto
- 1. "When We're Together" Released: 14 April 1997; 2. "Monday Morning 5:19" Released: 20 October 1997; 3. "Untouchable" Released: 5 January 1998; 4. "Dream Another Dream" Released: 16 March 1998; 5. "Summer's Over" Released: 13 July 1998

Rialto is the self-titled debut album by English rock band Rialto, released on 14 April 1998. One single from the album, Untouchable, reached the UK top 20, and two more, Monday Morning 5:19 and Dream Another Dream, reached the top 40. Monday Morning 5:19 also reached 69 in the Dutch charts.

== Reception ==
Professional ratings
Review scores
| Source | Rating |
|---|---|
| AllMusic | 3/5 stars |
| NME | 7/10 |
| PopMatters | 7.8/10 |
| Entertainment Weekly | B+ |

The album was received positively. Simon Williams of the NME noted the "lofty ambitions, vast choruses, huge ideals and small but incredibly significant victories". Sarah Zupko, writing for PopMatters, noted similarities to Pulp's Different Class, in terms of "lush arrangements and vocals".

== Track listing ==
All tracks are written by Louis Eliot.

CD1
| No. | Title | Length |
|---|---|---|
| 1. | "Monday Morning 5:19" | 4:50 |
| 2. | "Dream Another Dream" | 3:30 |
| 3. | "Broken Barbie Doll" | 4:19 |
| 4. | "Summer's Over" | 4:39 |
| 5. | "Untouchable" | 4:33 |
| 6. | "Hard Candy" | 3:04 |
| 7. | "Quarantine" | 5:04 |
| 8. | "Lucky Number" | 3:46 |
| 9. | "Love Like Semtex" | 3:30 |
| 10. | "When We're Together" | 3:37 |
| 11. | "The Underdogs" | 3:50 |
| 12. | "Milk Of Amnesia" | 4:20 |

== Charts ==
Chart performance for Rialto
| Chart (1998) | Peak position |
|---|---|
| UK Albums (OCC) | 21 |
| Scottish Albums (OCC) | 43 |
