= Night on Earth (Rialto album) =

Studio album by Rialto
- Released: 6 August 2001
- Recorded: 2000–2001
- Genres: Alternative rock; Britpop
- Length: 46:35
- Label: Eagle Records
- Producer: Jonny Bull

Rialto chronology
Rialto (1998)	Night on Earth (2001)	Neon & Ghost Signs (2025)

Singles from Night on Earth
- 1. "Anything Could Happen" Released: 25 June 2001; 2. "London Crawling" Released: 3 December 2001

Night on Earth is the second studio album by English rock band Rialto. It was released on 6 August 2001, after which the band went on a 24-year hiatus. It was released following their 2000 EP Girl on a Train, and included two tracks taken from it.

== Reception ==
Professional ratings
Review scores
Source	Rating
AllMusic	2.5/5 stars
Drowned in Sound	8/10
NME	2/5 stars

The album received mixed reviews; it was described as "elegantly epic" by The Independent, and as containing more electronic elements than the band's debut. Andy Thomas of Drowned in Sound described the band as writing "classic songs in a classic style", noting that this was "regardless of how much technology they [got] their hands on".

== Track listing ==
All tracks are written by Louis Eliot.

Night on Earth
No.	Title	Length
1.	"London Crawling"	4:44
2.	"Anything Could Happen"	4:15
3.	"Anyone Out There?"	3:22
4.	"Catherine's Wheel"	5:22
5.	"Idiot Twin"	4:17
6.	"Shatterproof"	4:40
7.	"Brilliant Fake"	3:22
8.	"Three Ring Circus"	4:24
9.	"Drive"	4:12
10.	"Deep Space"	4:44
11.	"Underneath a Distant Moon"	3:15
Total length:		46:35
