= Jacquetta Eliot, Countess of St Germans =

Jacquetta Jean Frederica Eliot, Countess of St. Germans (born 1943) is the third daughter of Miles Wedderburn Lampson, 1st Baron Killearn. She is his first daughter by his second marriage, to Jacqueline Aldine Leslie (née Castellani), daughter of Marchese Senator Aldo Castellani.

== Family and early life ==
On 9 October 1964 she married Peregrine Nicholas Eliot, 10th Earl of Saint Germans. The marriage lasted 26 years, ending in divorce in 1990. Three children were born during that marriage:

1. Jago Nicholas Aldo Eliot, Lord Eliot, born 24 March 1966, died 16 April 2006, leaving an infant son, Albert Clarence Eliot, who succeeded his grandfather as the 11th Earl
2. Hon Louis Robert Eliot (b. 11 April 1968)
3. Hon Francis Michael Eliot (b. 16 November 1971). It was later revealed that the noted painter Lucian Freud was his biological father.

== Career ==
In 1967, she played the role of Jacquetta in the film Echoes of Silence, written and directed by Peter Emanuel Goldman.

Jacquetta was a socialite and noted beauty and sat for various artists and photographers including Horst P. Horst, who featured her in Vogue's Book of Houses, Gardens and People, and Richard Avedon.

Between 1969 and 1978 she sat for Freud and featured in nine of his paintings, including the 1973 work Large Interior W9 and several drawings. In 2006 she modelled for Mario Testino in a Burberry advertisement.

She was a founder member/director of the Elephant Fayre 1981–1986. She has been featured in various documentaries about the life and art of Lucian Freud.
