= Earl of St Germans =

Earldom in the Peerage of the United Kingdom

Earldom of St Germans
- Arms: Argent, a Fess Gules, between double-cotises wavy Azure, Crest: An Elephant's Head couped Argent, collared Gules. Supporters: On either side an Eagle reguardant, wings expanded proper, each charged on the breast with an Ermine Spot.
- Creation date: 28 November 1815
- Created by: The Prince Regent (acting on behalf of his father, King George III)
- Peerage: Peerage of the United Kingdom
- First holder: John Eliot, 2nd Baron Eliot
- Present holder: Albert Eliot, 11th Earl of St Germans
- Heir presumptive: Louis Eliot
- Remainder to: The 1st Earl's heirs male of the body lawfully begotten and in default of such issue, to his brother William Eliot and the heirs male of his body lawfully begotten
- Subsidiary titles: Baron Eliot
- Status: Extant
- Seat: Port Eliot
- Motto: PRÆCEDENTIBUS INSTA (Press close upon those in the lead)

Earl of St Germans, in the County of Cornwall, is a title in the Peerage of the United Kingdom that is held by the Eliot family. The title takes its name from the village of St Germans, Cornwall, and the family seat is Port Eliot. The earldom has the subsidiary title of Baron Eliot.

== History ==
Edward Eliot represented St Germans, Liskeard and Cornwall in the House of Commons and served as a commissioner of the Board of Trade and Plantations. He was the son of Richard Eliot (died 1748) and his wife Harriot, illegitimate daughter of James Craggs the Younger by his mistress, the noted actress Hester Santlow. In 1784 he was created Baron Eliot, of St Germans in the County of Cornwall, in the Peerage of Great Britain. In 1789 he assumed by Royal licence the additional surname of Craggs. However, this surname has not been used by any of his descendants.

Lord Eliot's first son died in infancy; his second son, Edward James Eliot, also predeceased him, and he was succeeded by his third son, John Eliot, 2nd Baron Eliot, who in 1815 was created Earl of St Germans with remainder to his younger brother William Eliot and the heirs male of his body. The first earl had earlier represented St Germans and then Liskeard in Parliament.

William, the second Earl, was a diplomat and politician, having notably served as Parliamentary Under-Secretary of State for Foreign Affairs. His only son, the third Earl, was also a prominent politician and held ministerial office as Chief Secretary for Ireland, Postmaster General, Lord-Lieutenant of Ireland and Lord Steward of the Household. His third but eldest surviving son, the fourth Earl, was in the Diplomatic Service and briefly represented Devonport in the House of Commons. In 1870 he was summoned to the House of Lords through a writ of acceleration in his father's junior title of Baron Eliot. He never married and was succeeded by his younger brother, the fifth Earl.

Henry, the fifth Earl, was in the Foreign Office for many years. This line of the family failed on the death of his second but eldest surviving son, the sixth Earl, in 1922. The late Earl was succeeded by his first cousin, the seventh Earl. He was the eldest son of Colonel Charles George Cornwallis Eliot, the sixth son of the third Earl. He never married and was succeeded by his younger brother, the eighth Earl. He held several positions at court, notably as Gentleman Usher to King Edward VII and King George V.

As of 2016, the titles are held by the eleventh Earl, who succeeded his grandfather in 2016.

== Barons Eliot (1784) ==
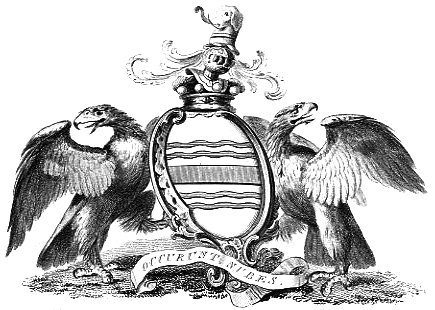
Heraldic achievement of Edward Craggs Eliot, 1st Baron Eliot, 1790

Port Eliot in St Germans, the Eliot family seat

- Edward Craggs Eliot, 1st Baron Eliot (1727–1804)
- John Eliot, 2nd Baron Eliot and 1st Earl of St Germans (1761–1823)

== Earls of Saint Germans (1815) ==
- John Eliot, 1st Earl of St Germans (1761–1823)
- William Eliot, 2nd Earl of St Germans (1767–1845)
- Edward Granville Eliot, 3rd Earl of St Germans (1798–1877)
- William Gordon Cornwallis Eliot, 4th Earl of St Germans (1829–1881)
- Henry Cornwallis Eliot, 5th Earl of St Germans (1835–1911)
- John Granville Cornwallis Eliot, 6th Earl of St Germans (1890–1922)
- Granville John Eliot, 7th Earl of St Germans (1867–1942)
- Montague Charles Eliot, 8th Earl of St Germans (1870–1960)
- Nicholas Richard Michael Eliot, 9th Earl of St Germans (1914–1988)
- Peregrine Nicholas Eliot, 10th Earl of St Germans (1941–2016)
  - Jago Nicholas Aldo Eliot, Lord Eliot (1966–2006), son of the 10th Earl and father of the 11th
- Albert Eliot, 11th Earl of St Germans (born 2004)

The heir presumptive is the present Earl's uncle, Louis Robert Eliot (b. 1968).

== Line of succession ==
- Peregrine Nicholas Eliot, 10th Earl of St Germans (1941–2016)
  - Jago Nicholas Aldo, Lord Eliot (1966–2006)
    - Albert Eliot, 11th Earl of St Germans (born 2004)
  - (1). Hon. Louis Robert Eliot (b. 1968)
  - (2). Hon. Francis Michael Eliot (b. 1971)

== Family tree ==
Eliot Family
Barons Eliot
Earls of Saint German

Edward Craggs-Eliot; Created 1784; 1st Baron Eliot; 1727-1804
Edward Eliot; 1757-1757	Edward James Eliot; 1758-1797	John Eliot; 2nd Baron Eliot; Created 1815; 1st Earl of Saint Germans; 1761-1823	William Eliot; 2nd Earl of Saint Germans; 1767-1845
Edward Granville Eliot; 3rd Earl of Saint Germans; 1798-1877
Edward Eliot styled Lord Eliot; 1827-1864	Granville Eliot; 1828-1854 killed at the Battle of Inkerman	William Eliot; 4th Earl of Saint Germans; 1829-1881	Henry Eliot; 5th Earl of Saint Germans; 1835-1911	Charles Eliot; 1839-1901
John Eliot; 6th Earl of Saint Germans; 1890-1922	Granville John Eliot; 7th Earl of Saint Germans; 1867-1942	Montague Charles Eliot; 8th Earl of Saint Germans; 1870-1960	Christian Edward Eliot; 1872-1940
Nicholas Richard Eliot; 9th Earl of Saint Germans; 1914-1988	Montague Robert Vere Eliot; 1923-1994
Peregrine Nicholas Eliot; 10th Earl of Saint Germans; 1941-2016
Jago Nicholas Aldo Eliot; Styled; Lord Eliot; 1966-2006	Louis Robert Eliot born 1968	Francis Michael Eliot born 1971
Albert Charger Eliot; 11th Earl of Saint Germans born 2004 also 12th Baron Eliot
