= Henry Eliot, 5th Earl of St Germans =

British Earl

Henry Cornwallis Eliot, 5th Earl of St Germans DL (11 February 1835 – 24 September 1911) was an English peer.

Henry Cornwallis Eliot was born in London on 11 February 1835 to Edward Granville Eliot, 3rd Earl of St Germans and his wife Jemima née Cornwallis (24 December 1803 – 2 July 1856).

Henry was educated at Eton College from 1845 to 1847, and served as a Midshipman in the Royal Navy in the Mediterranean Sea from 1848 to 1853. He was appointed as a Junior Clerk in the Foreign Office on 28 January 1855, where he worked until he succeeded to the Peerage in 1881.

In July 1867, he was Secretary to a special mission of Earl Vane to St Petersburg to invest the Emperor of Russia with the Order of the Garter. He was an Assistant Clerk from 1872 until the death of his older brother William Gordon Cornwallis Eliot, 4th Earl of St Germans on 19 March 1881 when he succeeded as 5th Earl of St Germans. In the 1881 Census, he was living at 13 Grosvenor Gardens, St George Hanover Square, London

== Family ==
Port Eliot, St Germans, the Eliot family seat

Henry married on 18 October 1881 at the Chapel Royal, Savoy Street, London to Emily Harriett Labouchere (24 June 1844 – 18 October 1933), the daughter of Henry Labouchere, the first and last Baron Taunton. They had two sons:

1. Edward Henry John Cornwallis Eliot, Lord Eliot (30 August 1885 – 24 August 1909)
2. John Granville Cornwallis Eliot, 6th Earl of St Germans (11 June 1890 – 31 March 1922)

Henry died on 24 September 1911 at Port Eliot, Cornwall and is buried at St Germans Church. His titles passed to his second son, John, since the eldest son had predeceased him without male issue.

Peerage of the United Kingdom
Preceded by William Eliot	Earl of St Germans; 1881–1911	Succeeded by John Eliot
