= Kinky Machine =

English alternative rock band (1991–1995)

- Origin: London, England
- Genres: Indie rock, britpop
- Years active: 1991–1995
- Labels: Lemon; MCA/Oxygen
- Past members: Louis Eliot; Julian Fenton; Jonny Bull; Malcolm Pardon; Nick Powell; Anthony Christmas

Kinky Machine were an English indie rock band, formed in 1991 in London. Members included Louis Eliot and Johnny Bull who continued on as Rialto, and Julian Fenton who later joined The Lightning Seeds.

== History ==
The band was formed in West London in late 1991 by singer and guitarist Louis Eliot and drummer Julian Fenton, adding guitarist Johnny Bull and bassist Malcolm Pardon. After signing to the Lemon label and releasing two singles in 1992, both hits on the UK Independent Chart, third single "Supernatural Giver" was a minor hit, and they were signed to MCA Records offshoot Oxygen. Further minor hits followed with "Shockaholic", which preceded their eponymous debut album, "Going Out With God", by which time Pardon had been replaced by Nick Powell, and "10 Second Bionic Man", before their second album, Bent, was released in 1994. They toured with Ned's Atomic Dustbin and Manic Street Preachers, and drew comparisons with Pulp and Mott the Hoople, with Allmusic identifying influences from glam rock, punk rock, and Sergeant Pepper-era Beatles, and The Encyclopedia of Popular Music author Colin Larkin also comparing the band to The Only Ones. They moved on to East West Records for a final single, "London Crawling", before splitting up in 1995 after Fenton had joined The Lightning Seeds, to be briefly replaced by Anthony Christmas. They had become disillusioned with the Britpop sound, with several of the bands that had supported them in the past (including Supergrass and Elastica) overtaking them and becoming prime movers in the scene, Eliot explaining "When we started, we were delving into British pop music for influences, from the Kinks and the Jam and Clash to the Beatles. All that Britpop became very boring." Eliot and Bull re-emerged in 1996 with Rialto, with Eliot later recording with a new band, the Embers.

== Discography ==
=== Albums ===
- Kinky Machine (1993), MCA/Oxygen
- Bent (1994), MCA/Oxygen

=== Singles and EPs ===
- "Going Out With God" (1992), Lemon
- "Swivelhead" (1992), Lemon
- "Supernatural Giver" (1993), Lemon - UK No. 70
- "Shockaholic" (1993), MCA/Oxygen - UK No. 70
- "Going Out With God" (1993), MCA/Oxygen - UK No. 74
- The Mark Goodier Sessions (1993), MCA/Oxygen
- "10 Second Bionic Man" (1994), MCA/Oxygen - UK No. 66
- "Cut It Down" (1994), MCA/Oxygen
- "London Crawling" (1995), East West
