= Tideford =

Coordinates: 50.4145°N 4.3266°W

Tideford: Cornish: Resteudhi
- Location within Cornwall
- Population: 325 (2001 UK census)
- OS grid reference: SX348597
- Civil parish: St Germans
- Shire county: Cornwall
- Region: South West
- Country: England
- Sovereign state: United Kingdom
- Post town: SALTASH
- Postcode district: PL12
- Dialling code: 01752
- Police: Devon and Cornwall
- Fire: Cornwall
- Ambulance: South Western
- UK Parliament: South East Cornwall

Tideford (/ˈtɪdɪfərd/; Cornish: Resteudhi) is a small village in east Cornwall, England, United Kingdom. It is twinned with Plouguerneau in Brittany, France.

Its name derives from its location on the River Tiddy, literally meaning "Ford on the River Tiddy". Tideford is not listed in the Domesday Book but the earliest settlement is thought to have been around 1100AD. The bridge over the River Tiddy at the bottom of Bridge Road dates from the 14th century and this is the earliest surviving structure.

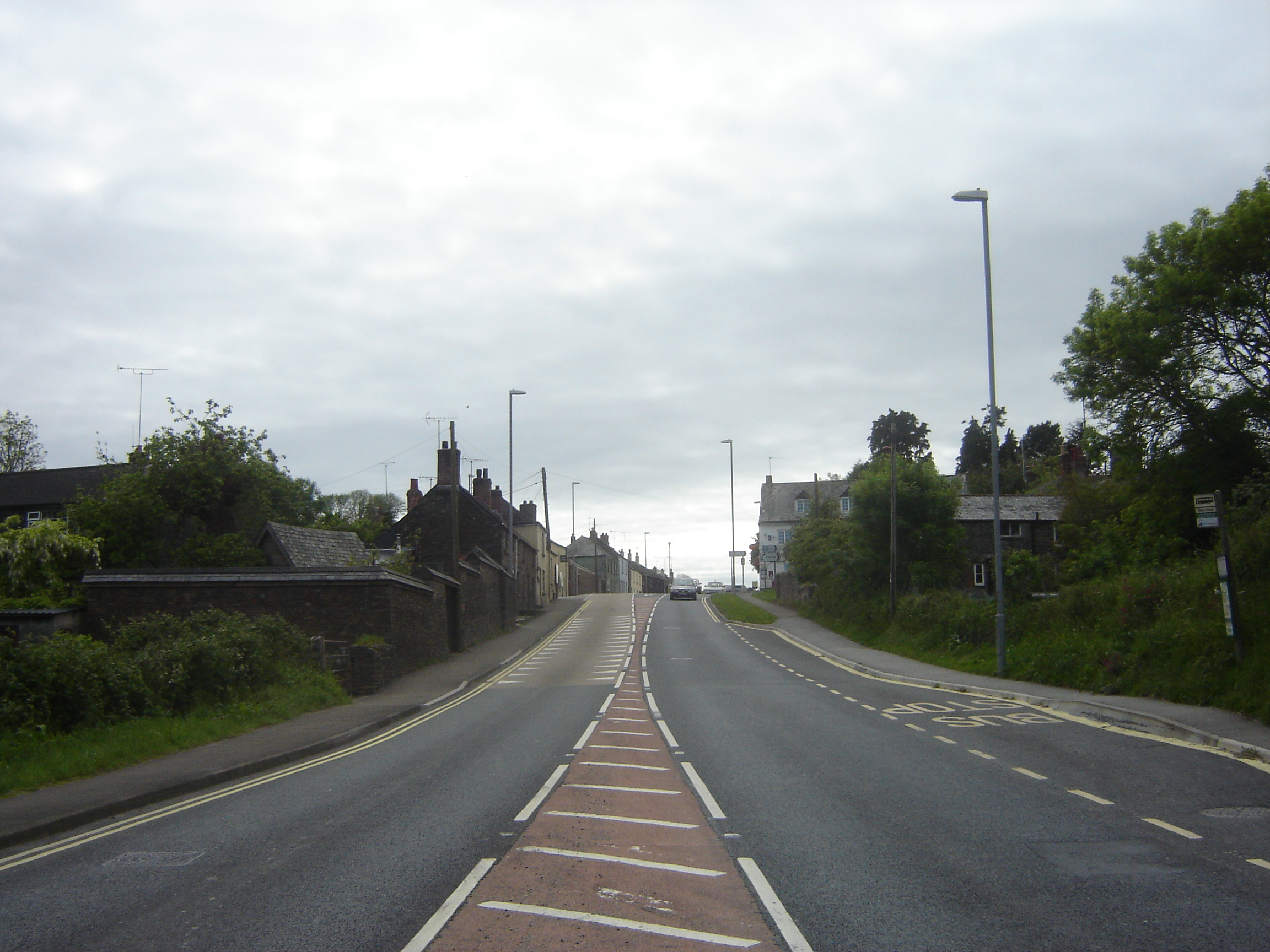
Westbound view of Tideford

Tideford grew in the eighteenth century as the nearby Port Eliot country estate built a number of houses in the village. Many of these have now been sold, but of note is 'Bridge House', located at the bottom of Bridge Road, which remains a gatehouse onto the estate.

The village is on the busy A38 between Saltash and Liskeard, one of two main road routes into Cornwall (the other being the A30 which runs into north Cornwall). Tideford does not have a railway station, the nearest being at St Germans, some two miles south.

The village has a butchers' shop, a branch of the Royal British Legion, a Montessori nursery and a small public house.

== Churches ==
The Victorian church of St Luke was designed by George Wightwick. It was built in 1845. The registers date from 1845. Tideford is now part of the united parishes of St Germans, Hessenford, Downderry and Tideford. The small Wesleyan Methodist chapel was built in 1838 and there was also a Reformed Methodist chapel. There was also once a Society of Friends' (Quakers') meeting house.

== Twinning ==
- Plougerne, Brittany, France

== Cricket ==
Although there is a cricket team called Tideford Cricket Club, the club has not played in the village for over 50 years and now plays on the outskirts of the neighbouring village of St Germans just 2 miles away along the B3249. In the late 19th Century the Earl of St Germans had a cricket ground purposely built about a mile West of St Germans along the B3249. The sloping land was excavated and tree trunks were laid as a base before being covered with top soil to give a flat playing surfaces thus making it one of the first purpose built, if not the first, cricket grounds in the County. St Germans Cricket Club played on the ground until folding in the early 1970s. From 1975 the ground has been the home ground of Tideford Cricket Club who re-located from a site they had been using near Trerulefoot. The club made the press in the late 70s when they were able to put out a full 11 players from the Snowdon Family. The views from the ground stretch out to the East as far as Maker Church (7 miles away) and several miles to the South across the valley to the Plymouth - Penzance railway line. To the North the ground is bordered by woods. Whilst the ground is very picturesque the facilities are basic with no mains electricity available (quoted £15K for installation in the 1990s). Tideford Cricket Club runs 2 adult teams (Cornwall Cricket League) and several junior age group teams (West Devon Youth League).

== See also ==
- Settlements on the A38
