= River Tiddy =

River in south-east Cornwall, England

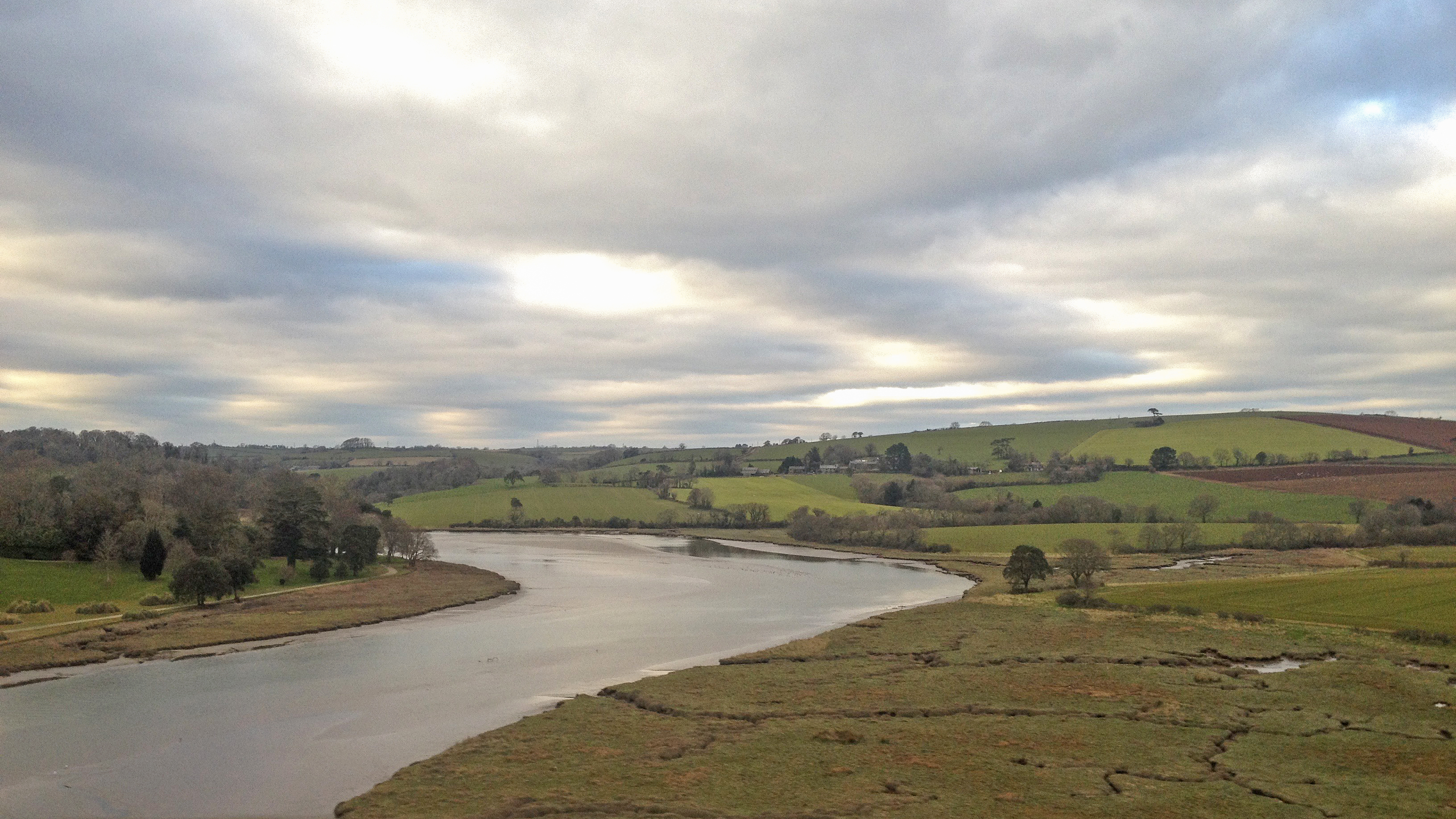

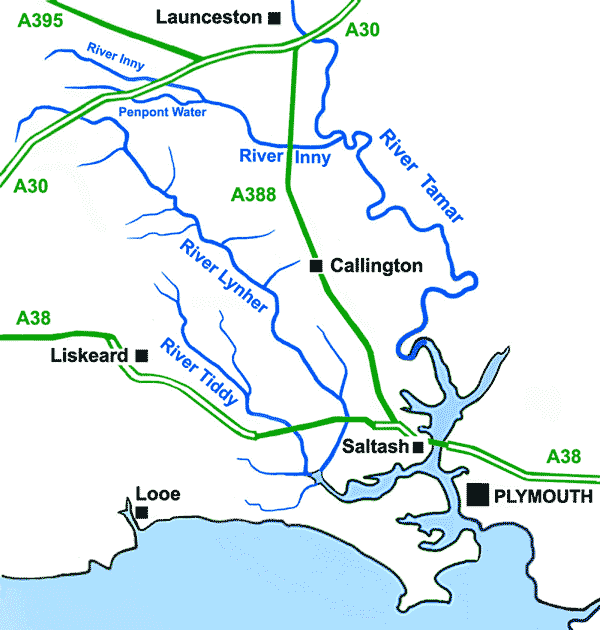
- A sketchmap of the River Tamar south of Launceston showing tributaries including the River Tiddy
- Native name: Teudhi (Cornish)

Location
- Country: England
- Region: Cornwall

Physical characteristics
- Source
  - location: Pensilva
  - coordinates: 50°30′04″N 4°25′24″W
  - elevation: 240 m (790 ft)
- Mouth
  - location: River Lynher
  - coordinates: 50°23′17″N 4°17′38″W

Basin features
- Tributaries
  - left: Polbathic Lake
  - right: Hay Lake

The River Tiddy (Cornish: Teudhi, meaning "to melt" or "to dissolve") is a small river in south-east Cornwall, England, United Kingdom. It is the main tributary of the River Lynher. The Tiddy rises near Pensilva and flows south east past the village of Tideford until it joins the Lynher just after passing St Germans. The name of Tideford derives from its location on the river, literally meaning "Ford on the River Tiddy".

St Germans is a historic fishing village situated on the Tiddy just upstream of its confluence with the Lynher. The Quay Sailing Club are based at St Germans Quay. The Tiddy and Lynher rivers are alternatively called St Germans River downstream of St Germans.
