= Granville Eliot, 7th Earl of St Germans =

English aristocrat

Granville John Eliot, 7th Earl of St Germans (22 September 1867 – 20 November 1942) was an English aristocrat.

== Early life ==
Granville Eliot was the son of Charles George Cornwallis Eliot (16 October 1839 – 22 May 1901) and his wife, Constance Rhiannon Guest (November 1844 - 1916). He was educated at Castleden Hall School, Farnborough, Hampshire and Charterhouse School and became a Bank Clerk, living in the Malverns.

== Title ==
On 21 March 1922, on the death of his first cousin John Granville Cornwallis Eliot, 6th Earl of St Germans, Granville became the 7th Earl of St Germans. He died unmarried on 20 November 1942 and his titles passed to his younger brother, Montague.

Peerage of the United Kingdom
Preceded by John Eliot	Earl of St Germans; 1922–1942	Succeeded by Montague Eliot
