= Montague Eliot, 8th Earl of St Germans =

British peer and courtier (1870–1960)

Montague Charles Eliot, 8th Earl of St Germans, KCVO, OBE (13 May 1870 – 19 September 1960) was a British peer and courtier.

Eliot was born in Pimlico, Middlesex to Charles George Cornwallis Eliot (16 October 1839 – 22 May 1901) and his wife Constance Rhiannon Guest (November 1844 – 1916). He was educated at Castleden Hall School, (Farnborough, Hampshire), Charterhouse and Exeter College, Oxford, taking a BA in 1893. By 1895, he was a Barrister-at-law at the Inner Temple.

From 1901 to 1906, he was appointed a Gentleman Usher to Edward VII, and from 1908 to 1910 a Groom-in-Waiting. From 1910 to 1936, he was a Gentleman Usher to George V. During the First World War, Montague was a Lieutenant-Commander with the RNVR. He was appointed Officer of the Order of the British Empire (OBE) in 1919, and became Groom of the Robes from 1920 to 1936.

In 1923, he was appointed Member of the Royal Victorian Order (MVO), and from 1924 to 1936 he became Extra Groom-in-Waiting to King George V. He was appointed Commander of the Royal Victorian Order (CVO) in the 1928 Birthday Honours; Knight Commander (KCVO) in 1934. In 1936 he became Extra Groom-in-Waiting to Edward VIII, and, from 1937 to 1952, Extra Groom-in-Waiting to George VI. From 1952 to 1960, he was Extra Groom-in-Waiting to Elizabeth II. He had been awarded the cross of Officer of the Order of Leopold (Belgium).

On 22 November 1942, Eliot succeeded his older brother Granville Eliot, 7th Earl of St Germans to become the 8th Earl of St Germans.

== Personal life ==
In 1907, under the name 'Ellova Gryn', Eliot published the parody Too Weak, a play on Elinor Glyn's Three Weeks. Under the same name, he was also the author of the books The Meanderings of Mary Ann, Reflections of Whiskerine, The Vicissitudes of Acetylene, The Nun and the Noodle, and Over the Mud that parodied other of Glyn's books such as The Vicissitudes of Evangeline.

In 1918, Eliot bought Ince Castle in Cornwall that had previously been owned by the Earl of Buckinghamshire.

He was married on 22 June 1910 to Helen Agnes Post (d. 1 September 1962), the daughter of Arthur Post of New York and his wife Elizabeth Wadsworth, a daughter of American General James S. Wadsworth who married, as her second husband, Lord Barrymore. They had a daughter and two sons:

- Lady Germaine Elizabeth Olive Eliot (11 April 1911 – 1991)
- Nicholas Richard Michael Eliot, 9th Earl of St Germans (1914–1988)
- (Montague) Robert Vere Eliot (29 October 1923 – 16 May 1994), contested Mansfield as a Conservative in the 1959 general election.

Eliot died on 19 September 1960 and his titles passed to his elder son, Nicholas Nicholas Richard Michael Eliot.

Peerage of the United Kingdom
Preceded by Granville Eliot	Earl of St Germans; 1942–1960	Succeeded by Nicholas Eliot
