= A Companion to the History of the Book =

A Companion to the History of the Book cover

A Companion to the History of the Book is a book first published by Wiley-Blackwell in 2007 in the Blackwell Companions series. It was issued in a second edition in two volumes in 2019. The editors are Simon Eliot, professor of the History of the Book at the University of London, and Jonathan Rose.
