= Anthony Christmas =

English drummer

- Born: Anthony Christmas
- Genres: Pop/Rock
- Years active: 2000s

Anthony Christmas is an English drummer who has played with Lionsheart, Kinky Machine, Rialto, and Ambershades.
