= Elephant Fayre =

- Genre: Rock music, media, experimental theatre and rock, punk, folk and reggae music
- Dates: 1980-1986
- Locations: Port Eliot, St Germans, England
- Website: History of the Elephant Fayre

The Elephant Fayre was held in the stately home of Port Eliot, St Germans, England. A "fayre" in every sense of the word, it featured a host of different types of performances, media, experimental theatre and rock, punk, folk and reggae music. The first Fayre was tiny, attracting only 1500 or so, but the attendance increased over the years as the organisers booked better known acts, such as Siouxsie and the Banshees, The Cure, and The Fall. The organisers decided to close down the festival after 1986 because of hard drug use and vandalism.

== History ==
In 1980 a small festival which had outgrown its site at Polgooth in mid-Cornwall approached the Port Eliot estate and asked if it could be held in the idyllic grounds. The estate office agreed a price, and there began the Elephant Fayre, one of the most eclectic festivals of the 1980s, which was named after the elephant in the Eliot family's crest. A prime attraction of the event was a giant wooden elephant which could be mounted via an internal ladder.

The festival ran from 1981 to 1986, beginning with some 1,500 visitors over four days, and featured a mix of music, theatre and visual arts. Over the years the festival grew, attracting crowds of up to 30,000 and bands such as The Cure, The Fall and Siouxsie and the Banshees. By 1986 the festival, like so many of the time, had become victim of its own success. The tolerance of the free festival culture of the 70s was over, as New Age Travellers became a focus for disorder across the country. Despite the tolerance of the then Lord Eliot and fellow festival benefactor Michael Eavis at Glastonbury (known affectionately in festival crew parlance as 'The Good Lord and The Worthy Farmer') the travellers put paid, it was said, to the Elephant Fayre and seriously compromised Glastonbury.

Whilst the festival at Port Eliot had built up a reputation as one of the best in the country, with extraordinary acts and the liberal attitude of the organisers, it was alleged the travellers had taken advantage and destroyed the festival. The burning down of the oldest tree in the park, looting of the village surgery and the robbing of stall-holders prompted Lord Eliot and fellow organisers to make the 1986 festival the last.

The Elephant Fayre has reinvented itself and is now the Port Eliot Festival. It describes itself as having "All the brains of a literary festival. All the soul of a music festival." It is held mid summer.

== See also ==
- List of historic rock festivals
- New Age travellers
