= Richard Eliot (MP for St. Germans) =

English Member of Parliament

Richard Eliot (c. 1546 – 1609), of Cuddenbeak and Port Eliot, St Germans, Cornwall, was an English Member of Parliament. He was a Member (MP) of the Parliament of England for St Germans in 1572.
