= Rialto (band) =

English rock band

- Origin: London, England
- Genres: Alternative rock, Britpop
- Years active: 1997–2002, 2023–present
- Labels: EastWest; China; Eagle; Koch (US)
- Members: Louis Eliot; Julian Taylor
- Past members: Pete Cuthbert; Jonny Bull; Toby Hounsham; Anthony Christmas

Rialto is an English rock band formed in London in 1997. They released their debut album, Rialto, in 1998, followed by their second album, Night on Earth, in 2001. Their single "Untouchable" reached the top 20 in the UK Singles Chart. In the summer of 1998, Rialto became the first ever UK chart band to release a single exclusively through the internet.

Despite finding favour with music critics, with Melody Maker anticipating "a fairytale future of Oasis-like proportions", the band were famously dropped by their label East West, a Warner Music Group imprint, a month before the release of their heavily promoted debut album, denting the group's chances of major commercial success. Neil McCormick noted that Rialto were "among the most critically acclaimed and highly touted new groups to emerge" of the late 1990s, making "carefully crafted, Beatlesque pop, with an epic, cinematic sound and slightly sinister lyrics". The group gained a following in East and Southeast Asia, particularly in South Korea where their debut reached the number one spot in their albums chart.

The band announced that they would release a new album, Neon & Ghost Signs, in 2025.

== Biography ==
Rialto formed from the remains of the band Kinky Machine, who featured frontman Louis Eliot, guitarist Jonny Bull and drummer Anthony Christmas. Kinky Machine released two albums: Kinky Machine in 1993 (Oxygen/MCA Records) and Bent in 1994. In 1995, the band signed to East West Records and released the single "London Crawling" which turned out to be the last release under that name. The lineup for this last single saw drummer Julian Fenton replaced by Anthony Christmas.

Still signed to East West Records, Eliot, Bull and Christmas continued working on new material through 1996 and added bassist Julian Taylor, second drummer Pete Cuthbert and keyboardist Toby Hounsham to the lineup. In 1997 released their first singles, "When We're Together" and "Untouchable." The latter was re-released in January 1998 and cracked the Top 20 in the UK Singles Chart. Despite the anticipated arrival of their debut album, East West Records dropped them from their label, with China Records releasing the album on 13 July 1998 instead.

A six-track EP, Girl On A Train, followed in 2000, receiving accolades from NME and Q magazines. By the time Rialto gathered to make a second album, Hounsham and Christmas had left the group, leaving them as a four-piece. The band released their second and final album, Night on Earth, in 2001.

Although plagued with bad luck in Britain, the band ultimately found an audience in East and Southeast Asia, notably South Korea, where they displaced Celine Dion from the number one spot with double Platinum album sales for Rialto. The group's strong Asian following would see Eliot play concerts in Hong Kong and Singapore when he went solo in 2004.

On 19 April 2023, it was announced that Rialto have reformed, and would be performing at the Shiiine On Weekender festival in November 2023.

In January 2025, the band announced a new album entitled Neon & Ghost Signs would be released on 25 April on Fierce Panda Records. The first track from it, "No One Leaves This Discotheque Alive", had its first airplay on the Steve Lamacq show on BBC Radio 6music on the 13 January 2025.

== Post-band activities ==
Following the band's original split, Eliot released his solo debut, the Everybody Loves You When You're Dead EP, in 2002, followed by his full-length debut, Long Way Round, on Iodine Records in 2004. In 2010, he released Kittows Moor under the name Louis Eliot and The Embers. Since 2011, Eliot has toured extensively as a full-time member of Grace Jones's band.

In 2014, Eliot and Lily Allen teamed up to cover the late Tarka Cordell's "Shelter You" for a compilation album commemorating his life. Eliot helped Cordell write the song originally and the chords echo Rialto's "Summer's Over".

Bull co-wrote the song "Friday Night" with Lily Allen at his studio in southwest Portugal. The song ended up on her debut album Alright, Still.

Toby Hounsham now plays keyboards for the Stranglers. He was presented with the Stranglers’ keyboardist Dave Greenfield’s original instrument which was later restored to full working order on an episode of The Repair Shop.

== Band members ==
- Louis Eliot – lead vocals, guitar, songwriter
- Jonny Bull – guitar, programming, backing vocals, producer
- Julian Taylor – bass, backing vocals and trumpet
- Pete Cuthbert – drums
- Toby Hounsham – keyboards (1997–2000)
- Anthony Christmas – drums (1997–2000)

== Discography ==
=== Albums ===
- Rialto (1998) – UK No. 21
- Night on Earth (2001)
- Neon & Ghost Signs (2025)

=== EP ===
- Girl on a Train (2000)

=== Singles ===
- "When We're Together" (1997)
- "Monday Morning 5.19" (1997) – UK No. 37
- "Untouchable" (1998) – UK No. 20
- "Dream Another Dream" (1998) – UK No. 39
- "Summer's Over" (1998) – UK No. 60
- "Anything Could Happen" (2001) - UK No. 85
- "London Crawling" (2001)
- "No One Leaves This Discotheque Alive" (2025)
- "Car That Never Comes" (2025)
- "Remembering Me Forget" (2025)
- "Neon & Ghost Signs" (2025)
