= Port Eliot Festival =

Festival in the UK

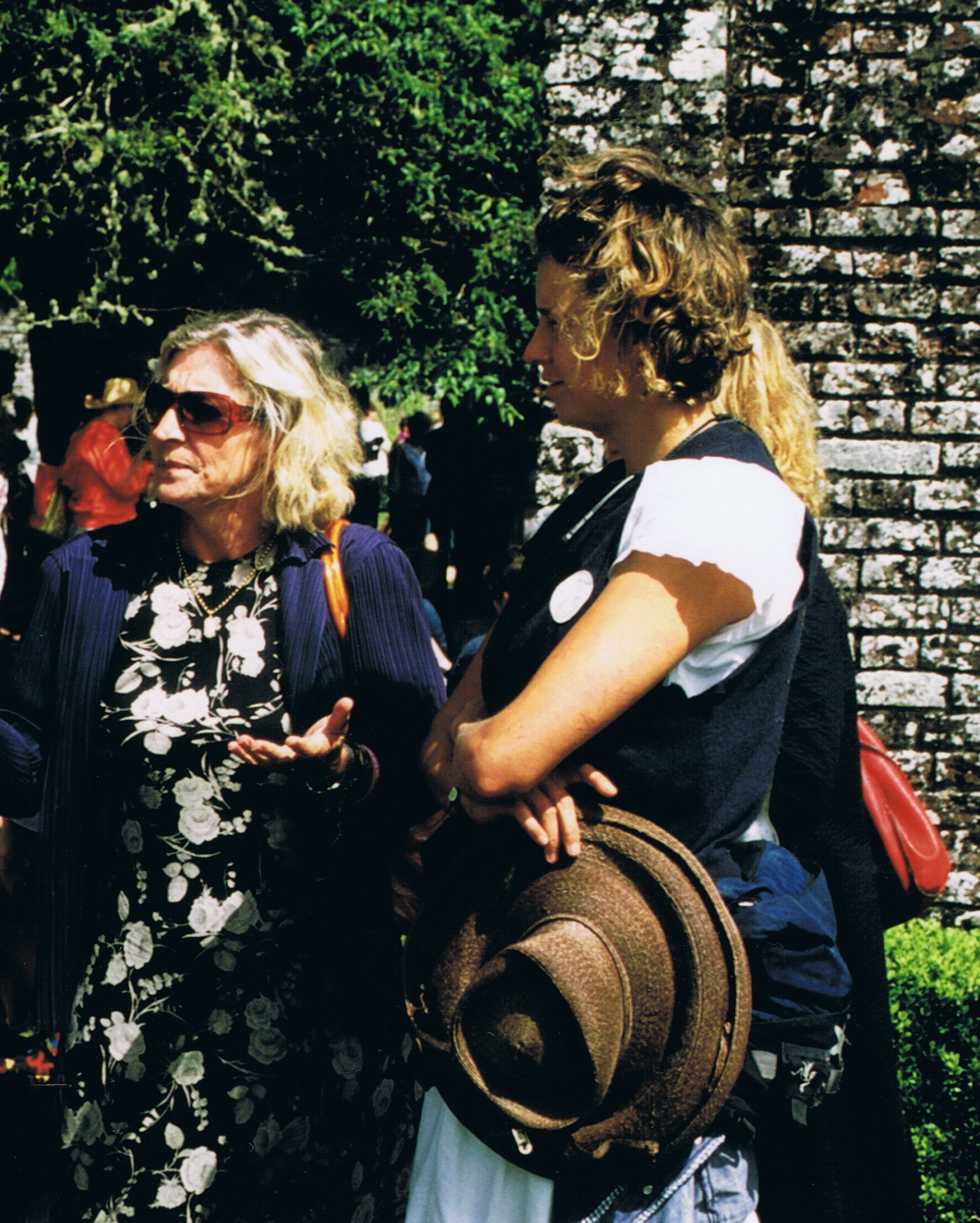
Rosie Boycott and Severine von Tscharner Fleming at the Port Eliot Festival, July 2007

The Port Eliot Lit Fest was an annual festival taking place at Port Eliot in Cornwall, in the United Kingdom. It was founded by the late Jago Eliot, and ran over three days in July each year at the Port Eliot estate. Guests who have attended the festival in past years are Hanif Kureishi, James Flint, Hari Kunzru and Louis de Bernières. The festival was founded in 1991, and ran until 2019.

== History ==
The festival was founded in 2001 by Jago Eliot, 10th Earl of St Germans, as a successor to the Elephant Fayre, which closed down in the mid-1980s. The festival runs over three days in July each year. Originally a "celebration of all things literary" by 2019 the festival had expanded to cover literature, food, wellbeing, comedy, fashion and music.

The 2010 festival included artists and performers such as Jakob Dylan, Talvin Singh, Barbara Hulanicki, Grayson Perry, Stephen Jones, Jarvis Cocker and Harper Simon. New acts included the vocal group Fisherman's Friends, the comic performer Wilfredo, and The Book Club Boutique Band. In 2016 there was a fashion camp including stylists Michael Alpern, Sarah Mower and Clare Waight Keller. In 2019 the speakers included Russell Brand and Bruce Parry, and Extinction Rebellion.

In 2019 it was announced that that year's event would be the last 'for the foreseeable future' due to rising costs. The organisers noted some of their favourite notable moments of past festivals, including Martin Scorsese choosing the films for the open air cinema, Kate Winslet reading children’s stories, Grayson Perry arriving on site on a customised pink motorbike and The Plez, Ross, Siobhan and Eseld being chauffeured to the Spicy bison tent by Lady St G herself.<ref name=":1" /
