= John Eliot, 6th Earl of St Germans =

British aristocrat

John Granville Cornwallis Eliot, 6th Earl of St Germans, MC (11 June 1890 – 22 March 1922) was a British aristocrat.

St Germans was born at 13 Grosvenor Gardens, London to Henry Cornwallis Eliot, 5th Earl of St Germans (11 February 1835 – 24 September 1911) and his wife Emily Harriett Labouchere (24 June 1844 – 18 October 1933).

He was educated at a college in St Peter Intra, Broadstairs, Kent and at the Royal Military College, Sandhurst. He subsequently became a captain in the 2nd Dragoons of the Scots Greys, and fought in the First World War. He was awarded the Military Cross for gallantry in supervising a working party for five hours in the open and under heavy fire.

== Family ==
He married Lady Blanche Linnie Somerset (15 April 1897 – 30 August 1968), the eldest daughter of the 9th Duke of Beaufort, on 11 June 1918 in London and they had two daughters:

1. Lady Rosemary Alexandra Eliot (26 February 1919 – 20 April 1963) who married three times; firstly 2 September 1939 Edward Christian Frederick Nutting (9 Sep 1917-k.a.Middle East Jan 1943), by whom she had one daughter Davina (1940–1976); m.2nd 24 Feb 1945 (annulled 1949) David Frederick Hew Dunn (b. 1917); m.3rd 22 Dec 1949 Ralph Alexander Rubens (died 1995) by whom she had one daughter Alexandra (b. 1950). Her elder daughter died in a car crash with her son, leaving issue one daughter Frederica Samantha Mary Cope, now Mrs David Arthur Thomas (born 1963). Her younger daughter is now Mrs Alexandra Peyronel. Both women, co-heiresses to one-half each of the barony of Botetourt have issue.
2. Lady Cathleen Blanche Lily Eliot (29 July 1921 - 1994); her elder son is David Seyfried Herbert, 19th Baron Herbert (born 1952). He has descendants.

St. Germans died in 1922 from the effects of an accident sustained during a point-to-point race at Wrangton near Totnes, Devon. As the youngest son with no sons to inherit, his title passed to his first cousin Granville John Eliot, 7th Earl of St Germans (22 September 1867 – 20 November 1942).

== Notes ==
Peerage of the United Kingdom
Preceded by Henry Cornwallis Eliot	Earl of St Germans; 1911–1922	Succeeded by Granville John Eliot
