= John Eliot (translator) =

English author and translator

John Eliot (fl. 1562 – 1593) was an English language teacher, translator and author of the Ortho-epia Gallica (1593), a manual for teaching French to Englishmen in the form of dramatic, entertaining dialogues, which has long been recognized as a source book for Shakespeare.

== Early life ==
Eliot was born in Warwickshire in 1562, attended Brasenose College, Oxford in 1580 but probably didn't take a degree, lived in France (three years in Paris at the College of Montaigu, a year as a schoolmaster in Orleans at the "College of Affricans," and another ten months in Lyons), travelled in Italy (as far as Naples, he says) and perhaps (he claims, but it seems doubtful) Spain.

He returned to England in 1588 or 1589. Once in London, he made a living teaching French and translating French books and pamphlets. He had the same publisher (John Wolfe) as Robert Greene and Gabriel Harvey, and was pretty certainly an acquaintance or friend of Shakespeare. Harvey was a literary enemy of Thomas Nashe. Eliot was either Harvey's ally or perhaps "a somewhat duplex figure in this quarrel: close to Nashe in spirit and to Harvey in fact."

Charles Nicholl conjectures that Eliot and Shakespeare were among the few people who were friends to both Nashe and Harvey, and could attempt to mediate in their quarrel. Eliot was probably a literary, philosophical and commercial enemy of John Florio, who was a protestant, a refugee, and a rival language teacher, and a champion and translator of Montaigne versus Eliot's hero, Rabelais.

== The Ortho-epia Gallica ==
Apart from a scholarly facsimile published in 1968, some excerpts printed in a small private press edition in 1928, and an Early English Books ("EEBO") version on Amazon, the Ortho-epia Gallica has been out of print since 1593, and only five copies of the original have survived.

Jack Lindsay says it is "a book the sprightly raciness of which none can deny ...the testament of an age when ... a sense of colour and character pervaded all, man-of-action and man-of-letters, so that every gallant is half a poet and every poet half a swasher. On this common ground of courageous merriment they all met; and there it is that Shakespeare and Eliot might have boused together and amused themselves with the chatter and febrile rages of Doll Tearsheet, and by their side some roaring Alsatian bravo..."

It was a book for teaching French to English students. It is mostly in a series of dialogues, French and English together either in matching columns or facing pages, many with a third column of phonetically-spelt French to help English students pronounce the French. Both the English and the French versions of the dialogues are lively and colloquial, easily accessible to a modern reader with no scholarly background.

The book takes material from many authors, including Rabelais, Boiastuau, Erasmus and Du Bartas, mostly unacknowledged, and is also a satire of several contemporary language teachers and authors, including Holyband and Florio. David Thomas says that Eliot deserves credit "for the brilliant way in which he manages to mould Goulart's rather staid commentary into a convincing, erudite, and even at times lively dialogue between the scholarly tutor (who represents Eliot himself) and his aspiring pupil. Only a reprinting of the two texts in parallel columns ... can show fully with what agility Eliot skips and prances in and out of the pages of his raw material, interpolating whole passages of his own invention, introducing a greater compactness or a more logical order into the often rather diffuse commentary offered by Goulart, retaining words and phrases which strike his imagination or which he thinks will be useful for his reader, discarding whole paragraphs which he (and we) would find boring, and generally creating a picture which is both illuminating and entertaining."

The Ortho-epia includes the first printed use of "thanks" (the Oxford English Dictionary's earliest reference is to Love's Labour's Lost, which it dates at 1598). Also for the first printed use of "till the Cow come home."

There are four pages in manuscript in the British Library (two leaves or sheets of paper written on front and back) of John Eliot’s Ortho-epia Gallica, folios 115 and 116 of a volume titled ‘An English Heraldic Manuscript’ (Harley MS 834).

== The Discourses, the Survay and other translations ==
Eliot made at least five translations for John Wolfe (The Sicke-Mans Comfort, against Death and the Devill, the Law and Sinne, the Wrath and Judgment of God, translated out of the Frenche into Englishe by I.E., SR April 11, 1589 (printed in 1590); B. De Loque, Discourses of Warre and single Combat, Translated out of French by I. Eliot, SR April 11, 1589 (printed in 1591); Advise, Given by a Catholike Gentleman, to the Nobilitie and Commons of France ... Translated out of the French by I. Eliote, SR May 22, 1589 (printed in 1589); News Sent to the Ladie Princesse of Orenge, translated out of French into English by I.E., SR June 9, 1589 (printed in 1589)).

== Eliot as a source for Shakespeare ==
Dame Frances Yates, in her A Study of Love's Labour's Lost, in 1936, argued that Eliot is a source for at least two speeches in other plays of Shakespeare. One is the traveller speech from Act 1 of King John (scene 1, 189-208), which Yates does not say is lifted or copied from Eliot, but rather follows a model and pattern scattered through the Ortho-epia. The other is from Act 1 of Twelfth Night, a conversation between Sir Andrew Aguecheek and Sir Toby Belch, (scene 3, lines 92-102), which brings together French words, the idea of tongues and languages, and concepts of "art" versus "nature," and again there's no copying or lifting, but the linking together of themes used by Eliot shows that Shakespeare had read and absorbed the book. With the fact that Shakespeare knew and used Eliot's book established to her satisfaction, Yates argues with confidence that many more minor or passing references in Love's Labour's Lost that resemble or echo passages in the Ortho-epia, particularly to schoolmasters and teaching and the form and style of dialogues, are not coincidence.

J.W. Lever, in his article on Eliot as a source for Shakespeare works through more textual echoes and connections between Eliot and Shakespeare, starting with the French, but quickly moving to the English as well.

For the French, it's the small oddities that are most convincing - when Pistol's boy, on the battlefield in Henry V, says Pistol is ready to cut the Frenchman's throat "tout asture" (Act 4, scene 4, lines 37-39), this obviously mean "a cette heure", right now, and it's lifted straight from Eliot, who says (Lever cites The Thief, p. 2-104, on the French side) "asteure". Lever thinks it's a mistake, but not Shakespeare's - he has taken the error from Eliot. I think Lever is right that Shakespeare took the word from Eliot, but wrong to think it's a slip of Eliot's pen. For a start Eliot uses "asteure" many other times and it's also in Cotgrave's 1611 Dictionarie: "Asteure, as, à cett heure; Presently, even now." It's not an error.

Then there's Pistol's challenge as a sentry, "Che vous la" (in the Folio), or "Ke va la" (in the Quartos), which picks up the same challenge in Eliot, "Kivala." In the Ortho-epia "Kivala" is given as the English version of the conventional "Qui va la?" on the French side of the page. Lever convincingly concludes it is Elizabethan thieves' slang.

Lever then traces echoes of Eliot's work in Shakespeare, in French and English, in Henry V, Romeo and Juliet, King John, A Winter's Tale, and the sonnets. He notes that John of Gaunt's "sceptred isle" speech in Richard II sounds a lot like (but is a definite improvement upon) Eliot's translation of a poem by Du Bartas about France.

In 1968 Alice Shalvi argued in her introduction to Eliot's translation of De Loque's Discourses of Warre and Single Combat, that while in Henry V "there are few verbal echoes or citations as obvious as those cited by Professor Lever ... a comparison of certain aspects and specific passages of the works reveals both the matter and the tone of the only one of Shakespeare's plays primarily concerned with the justifications for war and the manner of conducting it owe something to Eliot's translation of Loque." Eliot says "Our arme hath encountered, but the arme of the Lord hath vanquished." Henry says "And not to us, but to Thy arm alone, ascribe we all..."

Ambrose Murphy has shown that the author or authors of The Reign of King Edward III (Shakespeare and one or more collaborators), used John Eliot’s 1591 translation of Bertrand de Loque’s Discourses of Warre and single Combat for inspiration and guidance.

In 1986 Joseph A. Porter added more parallels from Eliot in Shakespeare.

The first echo is in Lear (Act 4, scene 6), "sa, sa, sa, sa" as a phrase from Eliot (which itself echoes Rabelais), linked to running away or shooing away, and then, later, to killing.

In Henry V it's Mistress Quickly's puzzling "a babbled of green fields", since Eliot has a pair of prattlers talking of green fields, with the French for prattlers given (across the page) as "babillards."

Timothy Billings in 2005 added more echoes. He focusses on Eliot's French texts, and cites dialogue in The Inne (actually it's in the next dialogue, "The Going to Bed," at pp. 2–120 to 2-123) and the dialogue between King Henry and Princess Katherine in Henry V. Eliot has the guest ask for a kiss from the maid in the English text, but in French has him say "Escouter Gaudinette, baisez moy une fois mamie...". As Billings says, the baiser kissing/fucking translation is an elementary trap for a learner of French. Billings says Eliot is being mischievous, setting the trap rather than pointing it out. Shakespeare uses the same joke in a bilingual scene, as the king says "I will kiss your lips, Kate," and Katherine replies that it is not the custom of ladies in France "etre baisées devant leur noces." The joke continues as their interpreter says she "cannot tell vat is baiser en Anglish," the king replying "to kiss," and Alice demurely saying "Your majesty entend bettre que moi."

There is no record of Eliot after 1593.
