= Edward Eliot, 3rd Earl of St Germans =

British politician and diplomat (1798–1877)

The Right Honourable The Earl of St Germans KP GCB PC DL
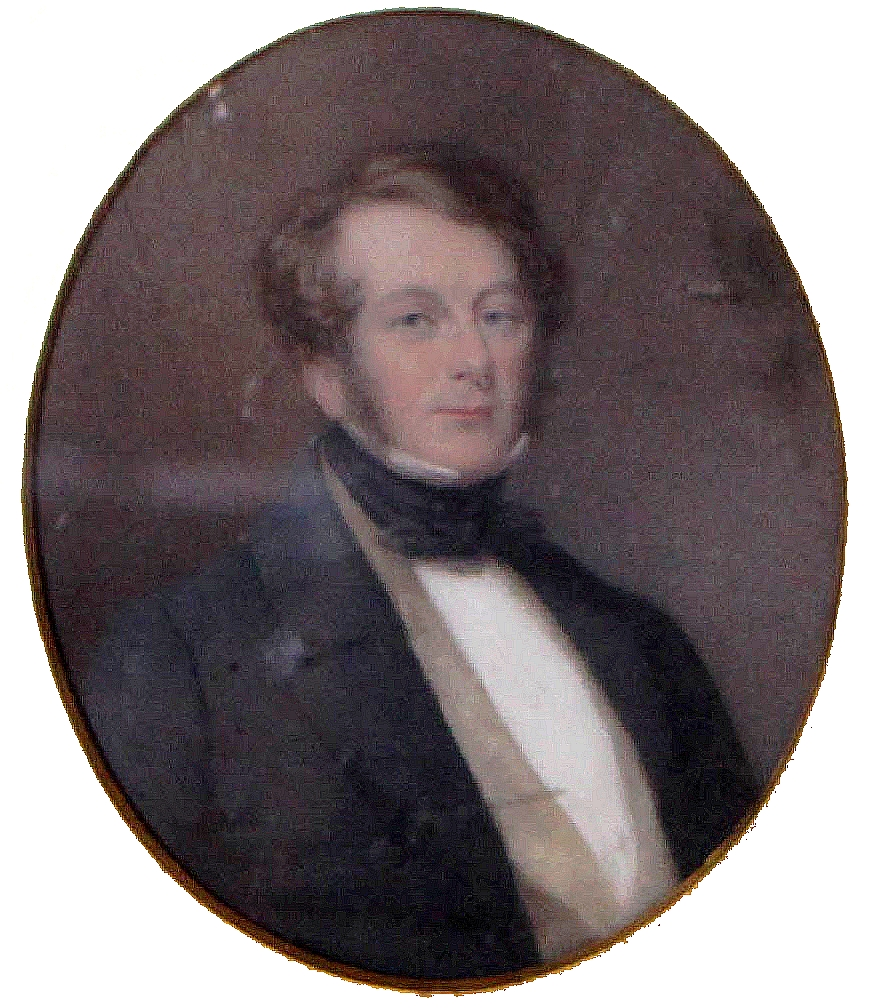

Lord Lieutenant of Ireland
- In office 5 January 1853 – 30 January 1855
- Monarch: Queen Victoria
- Prime Minister: The Earl of Aberdeen
- Preceded by: The Earl of Eglinton
- Succeeded by: The Earl of Carlisle

Personal details
- Born: 29 August 1798 Plymouth, Devon, England
- Died: 7 October 1877 (aged 79) St Germans, Cornwall, England
- Party: Tory (1824–34); Conservative (1834–46); Peelite (1846–59); Liberal (1859–77)
- Spouse: Lady Jemima Cornwallis (m. 1824; died 1856)
- Children: 8, including William and Henry
- Education: Christ Church, Oxford

Edward Granville Eliot, 3rd Earl of St Germans KP GCB PC DL (29 August 1798 – 7 October 1877), styled Lord Elliot from 1823–45, was a British politician, peer, and diplomat.

== Background and education ==
St Germans was born in Plymouth, Devon, the son of William Eliot, 2nd Earl of St Germans and his first wife, Lady Georgina (13 April 1769 – 4 March 1806), daughter of Granville Leveson-Gower, 1st Marquess of Stafford. He was educated at Westminster School from 1809 to 1811, and matriculated at Christ Church, Oxford on 13 December 1815.

== Political career ==
St Germans became the Secretary of Legation at Madrid on 21 November 1823. He became member of parliament for Liskeard the following year. Beginning his career as a Tory, he remained loyal to Robert Peel and served as a Junior Lord of the Treasury from 1827 until 1830. Out of parliament between 1832 and 1837, he served in Peel's second government first as Chief Secretary for Ireland and later as Postmaster General of the United Kingdom. He brokered the so-called Lord Eliot Convention in Spain, which aimed to end the indiscriminate executions by firing squad of prisoners on both sides of the First Carlist War.

When the debate over the Corn Laws broke the Conservative Party he followed Peel and served as Lord Lieutenant of Ireland in Lord Aberdeen's coalition government. In that role, he hosted the visit of Queen Victoria and the Prince Consort to the 1853 Great Exhibition held in Dublin. The Queen gave Lady St Germans a gift of jewellery to mark the occasion. He was twice Lord Steward under Lord Palmerston. In 1860, he accompanied the Prince of Wales on his tour of Canada and the USA.

== Marriage and issue ==
Lord St Germans married Lady Jemima Cornwallis (24 December 1803, Brome, Suffolk – 2 July 1856, Dover Street, London), the third daughter of Charles Cornwallis, 2nd Marquess Cornwallis, at St James Church, Westminster, on 2 September 1824. They had six sons and two daughters:

- Lady Louisa Susan Cornwallis Eliot (17 December 1825 – 15 January 1911), married Walter Ponsonby, 7th Earl of Bessborough and was the mother of Edward Ponsonby, 8th Earl of Bessborough.
- Edward John Cornwallis Eliot, Lord Eliot (2 April 1827 – 26 November 1864), born in London, educated at Eton from 1839 to 1843, matriculated at Christ Church, Oxford on 21 October 1844, commissioned a Cornet and Sub-lieutenant, 1st Regiment of Life Guards and subsequently Captain of that Regiment, 1852, died unmarried at Port Eliot.
- Captain Hon. Granville Charles Cornwallis Eliot (9 September 1828 – 5 November 1854), officer Coldstream Guards, killed at the Battle of Inkerman.
- William Gordon Cornwallis Eliot, 4th Earl of St Germans (14 December 1829 – 19 March 1881), diplomat; succeeded his father but died unmarried
- Hon. Ernest Cornwallis Eliot (28 April 1831 – 23 January 1832), died in infancy
- Hon. Elizabeth Harriet Cornwallis Eliot (24 August 1833 – 16 March 1835), died in infancy
- Henry Cornwallis Eliot, 5th Earl of St Germans (11 February 1835 – 24 September 1911), succeeded elder brother
- Colonel Hon. Charles George Cornwallis Eliot, CVO (16 October 1839 – 22 May 1901), courtier and soldier, equerry to THR Prince and Princess Christian 1869–96; Groom of the Bedchamber 1871–99, Gentleman Usher Daily Waiter to Queen Victoria 1899–1901; married on 26 October 1865 Constance Rhiannon Guest (daughter of Sir John Josiah Guest, Bt and Lady Charlotte Guest), Lady-in-Waiting to HRH Princess Frederica of Hanover

Lord St Germans died at Port Eliot in October 1877, aged 79. Through his youngest son, he was the great-grandfather of Margaret Eliot (1914–2011), the mother of Peter and Jane Asher.

Parliament of the United Kingdom
Preceded by William Eliot; Sir William Henry Pringle	Member of Parliament of Liskeard; 1824–1832; With: Sir William Henry Pringle	Succeeded by Charles Buller
Preceded by Sir Sir William Molesworth, Bt; Sir William Salusbury-Trelawny, Bt	Member of Parliament of East Cornwall; 1837–1845; With: Sir Hussey Vivian, Bt 1837–1841; William Rashleigh 1841–1845	Succeeded by William Rashleigh; William Pole-Carew
Political offices
Preceded by Viscount Morpeth	Chief Secretary for Ireland; 1841–1845	Succeeded by Sir Thomas Fremantle, Bt
Preceded by The Earl of Lonsdale	Postmaster General; 1845–1846	Succeeded by The Marquess of Clanricarde
Preceded by The Earl of Eglinton	Lord Lieutenant of Ireland; 1853–1855	Succeeded by The Earl of Carlisle
Preceded by The Earl Spencer	Lord Steward; 1857–1858	Succeeded by The Marquess of Exeter
Preceded by The Marquess of Exeter	Lord Steward; 1859–1866	Succeeded by The Earl of Bessborough
Peerage of the United Kingdom
Preceded by William Eliot	Earl of St Germans; 1845–1877	Succeeded by William Eliot
Peerage of Great Britain
Preceded by William Eliot	Baron Eliot (descended by acceleration); 1845–1870	Succeeded by William Eliot
