= Nicholas Eliot, 9th Earl of St Germans =

British peer (1914-1988)

The Right Honourable The Earl of St Germans
- Born: 26 January 1914; Marylebone, London, England
- Died: 11 March 1988 (aged 74); Tangier, Morocco
- Occupation: Landowner
- Title: 9th Earl of St Germans
- Spouses: Helen Mary Villers (m. 1939–1947); Margaret Eleanor R. Wyndham (m. 1948–1959); Mary Bridget Thomas (m. 1965–1988)
- Children: Peregrine Eliot, 10th Earl of St Germans and 1 other

Nicholas Richard Michael Eliot, 9th Earl of St Germans (26 January 1914 – 11 March 1988) was a British peer.

== Early life and education ==
Born at 2, Wyndham Place, Marylebone, London, Eliot was the son of Montague Eliot, 8th Earl of St Germans and Helen Agnes, daughter of Arthur Post, of New York. He was educated at Eton.

== Career ==
Eliot became a captain in the Duke of Cornwall's Light Infantry, attached to the Royal Armoured Corps. He was a Justice of the Peace and DL.

On 16 September 1960, he succeeded his father to become the 9th Earl of St Germans.

== Personal life ==
Lord St Germans married three times:

- On 25 April 1939 (divorced 1947) to Helen Mary (17 April 1915 – 6 December 1951), daughter of Lieutenant-Colonel Charles Walter Villiers, DSO, CBE, of the Royal Scots Fusiliers (a descendant of the politician and diplomat Thomas Villiers, 1st Earl of Clarendon – himself son of the 2nd Earl of Jersey – and of the politician John Parker, 1st Baron Boringdon), and Lady Kathleen Mary, daughter of Lowry Cole, 4th Earl of Enniskillen. Their children were:
  - Peregrine Nicholas Eliot (b. 2 January 1941, d. 15 July 2016)
  - Lady Frances Helen Mary Eliot (6 March 1943 – 6 January 2004) who was married 9 October 1965 (div 1987) to Charles Petty-Fitzmaurice, 9th Marquess of Lansdowne.
- On 27 May 1948 (divorced 1959) to Margaret Eleanor, daughter of Lieutenant-Colonel William Francis George Wyndham, of Heathfield Lodge (great-grandson of George Wyndham, 3rd Earl of Egremont and a descendant also of the Lords Polwarth) and Maud Eleanor, daughter of William Sydney Hylton Jolliffe, of Heath House, Petersfield, Hampshire (son of the politician William Jolliffe, 1st Baron Hylton); they had no issue
- In 1965, to Mary Bridget Thomas, daughter of colonial Governor Sir Shenton Thomas, with no issue.

Lord St Germans died on 11 March 1988 in Tangiers, Morocco, and his titles passed to his son, Peregrine Nicholas Eliot.

Peerage of the United Kingdom
Preceded by Montague Eliot	Earl of St Germans; 1960–1988	Succeeded by Peregrine Eliot
