= Peregrine Eliot, 10th Earl of St Germans =

British peer (1941-2016)

The Right Honourable The Earl of St Germans
- Born: Peregrine Nicholas Eliot; 2 January 1941
- Died: 15 July 2016 (aged 75)
- Occupation: Landowner
- Title: 10th Earl of St Germans
- Spouses: Jacquetta Jean Frederika Lampson (with issue) (m. 1964–1989); Elizabeth Dorothy Williams (m. 1992–1996); Catherine Wilson (m. 2005)
- Children: Jago Nicholas Aldo Eliot (known as Lord Eliot) (1966–2006); Louis Robert Eliot (1968–); Francis Michael Eliot (1971–)

Peregrine Nicholas Eliot, 10th Earl of St Germans (2 January 1941 – 15 July 2016), was a British peer and founder of the Elephant Fayre and Port Eliot Lit Fest.

== Biography ==
Peregrine Nicholas Eliot was the son of Nicholas Eliot, 9th Earl of St Germans and his wife Helen Mary (17 April 1915 – 6 December 1951), daughter of Lieutenant-Colonel Charles Walter Villiers, DSO, CBE, of the Royal Scots Fusiliers, and Lady Kathleen Mary, daughter of Lowry Cole, 4th Earl of Enniskillen. Charles Villiers was a descendant of the politician and diplomat Thomas Villiers, 1st Earl of Clarendon- himself a son of the 2nd Earl of Jersey- and of the politician John Parker, 1st Baron Boringdon.

Eliot was educated at Eton.

In 1963, he became a partner in Seltaeb, the company established to oversee the distribution of Beatles merchandise.

In 1988, on the death of his father, he succeeded as the 10th Earl of St Germans.

== Festivals ==
=== Elephant Fayre ===
Port Eliot, St Germans, the Eliot family seat

In 1980 a small festival which had outgrown its site at Polgooth in mid-Cornwall approached the Port Eliot estate and asked if it could be held in the idyllic grounds. The estate office agreed a price, and there began the Elephant Fayre, one of the most eclectic festivals of the 1980s. The festival ran from 1981 to 1986, beginning with some 1,500 visitors over four days, and featured a mix of music, theatre and visual arts. Over the years the festival grew, attracting crowds of up to 30,000 and bands such as The Cure, The Fall and Siouxsie and the Banshees. The burning down of the oldest tree in the park, looting of the village surgery and the robbing of stall-holders in 1985 prompted Lord Eliot and fellow organisers to make the 1986 festival the last.

=== Port Eliot Festival ===
In 2003 Lord St Germans began the Port Eliot Lit Fest.

== Marriages and children ==
He was married three times:

On 9 October 1964 he married Jacquetta Jean Frederika Lampson (born 1943), a daughter of Miles Lampson, 1st Baron Killearn. They had three sons:

- Jago Nicholas Aldo Eliot, Lord Eliot (24 March 1966 – 15 April 2006), father of Albert Clarence Eliot, 11th Earl of St Germans (born 4 November 2004)
- Louis Robert Eliot (born 11 April 1968)
- Francis Michael Eliot (born 16 November 1971)

They were divorced in 1990.

On 20 April 1992 he married Elizabeth Dorothy Williams (born 1961), with no issue. They were divorced in 1996.

In September 2005 he married Catherine Wilson, with no issue.

== Death ==
Peregrine Eliot, 10th Earl St. Germans died after a short illness (following surgery for cancer) on 15 July 2016.

Peerage of the United Kingdom
Preceded by Nicholas Eliot	Earl of St Germans; 1988–2016	Succeeded by Albert Eliot
