= Louis Eliot =

English musician (born 1968)

- Born: Louis Robert Eliot; 11 April 1968 (age 58)
- Member of: Rialto
- Formerly of: Kinky Machine; Louis Eliot and The Embers

Hon. Louis Robert Eliot (born 11 April 1968) is an English singer, songwriter and guitarist, formerly of Kinky Machine and currently Rialto. He is the second son of Peregrine Eliot (1941–2016) and Hon. Jacquetta Jean Frederika Lampson, third daughter of the Scottish diplomat Miles Lampson, 1st Baron Killearn. In the early 1980s, his father held Elephant Fayre at their home Port Eliot. In 1988, his father succeeded as the 10th Earl of St Germans. His parents divorced in 1989.

He had an elder brother, Jago, Lord Eliot (1966–2006), and has a younger brother, Hon. Francis Michael (born 1971). He was educated at Eton.

As a child, Eliot was taught guitar by Hawkwind guitarist Huw Lloyd-Langton. He attended Chelsea School of Art.

His first cousins, through his mother's younger sister, are Oscar-winning composer Atticus Ross (also of band Nine Inch Nails), producer Leopold Ross, and model Liberty Ross.

== Discography ==
- Everybody Loves You When You're Dead (2002)
- The Long Way Round (2004)
- Kittow's Moor (2010) (as Louis Eliot and The Embers) (Fullfill)
