= Simon Eliot =

British historian of the book

Simon Jonathan Eliot, BA, MA, PhD, FRHistS (born 2 January 1947) is a British scholar specialising in the history of the book. He is Professor Emeritus of the History of the Book and a Senior Research Fellow at the Institute of English Studies, School of Advanced Study, University of London.

== Education and career ==
Born in North London to Hugh and Marian Eliot, he attended Finchley County Grammar School (1958-65), and went on to study English and History at the University of Sussex (BA 1968, MA 1969). Somewhat later he moved to University College London where he undertook research supervised by John Sutherland at UCL and Michael Turner at Oxford (PhD awarded for ‘ “His Generation Read his Stories”: The Publishing History of Sir Walter Besant’ in 1990, external examiner Lord Asa Briggs).

He was appointed as Lecturer and Staff Tutor in English at the Open University in 1976; and as Senior Lecturer in 1994. While at the University he wrote OU-published (and therefore in the public domain) undergraduate and postgraduate teaching material on subjects ranging from the 16^{th} to the 20^{th} centuries. His work for OU broadcasting on BBC2 television included programmes on nineteenth-century science fiction (1979) and ‘Shakespeare and War’ (1997). He devised and then chaired the University's MA in Literature in the 1980s; a programme to introduce first-year undergraduates to computing for the humanities; and the Arts Faculty's Information Technology committee, the latter two in the 1990s. While at the OU he co-founded with Jonathan Rose the Society for the History of Authorship, Reading and Publishing in 1991 (first conference: New York, 1993), and was its second president (1998-2001). In the mid-1990s Eliot devised and, with colleagues, set up the Reading Experience Database (RED) which aims to accumulate material evidence of reading in Britain from the 1450s to 1914.

In May 2000 Eliot was appointed to a personal chair in publishing and printing history in the departments of English and Typography & Graphic Communication at the University of Reading. Here he directed two funded postdoctoral fellowships: one from the AHRB for a four-year project on ‘Spreading and selling the word: transporting, wholesaling and retailing texts in Britain 1830-1919’ (postdoctoral fellow Dr Stephen Colclough); and one from the Leverhulme Trust for a three-year project on ‘In the crucible of war: the transformation of English publishing 1938-1949’ (postdoctoral fellow Dr Valerie Holman). This resulted in: Valerie Holman, Print for Victory (London: British Library, 2008) ISBN 978-0-7123-5001-3

From 1997 Eliot had chaired the Institute of English Studies's MA in Book History. In December 2005 he was appointed to a personal chair in the history of the book in the IES, which is part of the School of Advanced Study in the University of London. In 2007 he set up the London Rare Books School with support from those running the original RBS in the University of Virginia at Charlottesville. The London version offered many of the MA courses, but also developed new options, many of which would later be incorporated in the MA. Both programmes draw not only on the publishing industry in and around London, but also on its antiquarian book trade, and on its many libraries and archival collections, to offer practical experience as part of the degree.

While at IES, Eliot was jointly responsible (with Professor Wariwck Gould, then Director of the Institute) for acquiring a history of writing collection from Mr Alan Cole, and for developing a 'Virtual Museum of Writing' derived from it. This is currently being further developed by Senate House Library. During his professorship, Eliot gained funding for postdoctoral fellowships from AHRC (for work on RED) 2006-08, from Oxford University Press (for work on the history of OUP) from 2006, and from AHRC again (for work on the communication history of the Ministry of Information) 2013-17.

== Scholarship ==
Eliot has worked on various aspects of the history of the book, mostly in the long nineteenth century (roughly 1770-1914), including: quantitative book history, the economics of the book trade, history of reading, history of circulating and public libraries, the Stationers' Company and legal deposit, and the history of individual publishers. This has resulted in over fifty articles or chapters in scholarly publications. In the last decade his research has broadened to include means of communicating other than print, and this has resulted in a communication history of the Ministry of Information 1939-46 (Information at War, 2026).

== Selected Publications ==
=== Books ===
The Publishers' Circular and the English Catalogue 1837-1900: a Comprehensive Microfiche Edition with a Bibliographical and Historical Introduction, edited by Simon Eliot and John Sutherland (Cambridge: Chadwyck-Healey, 1988). 83,660 pp. plus 40 pp. Introduction. ISBN 978-0-85964-216-3

Simon Eliot, Some Patterns and Trends in British Publishing, 1800-1919 (London: Bibliographical Society, 1994), 177 pp. ISSN 0267-5242

Simon Eliot and W.R. Owens (eds.), A Handbook of Literary Research (London: Routledge, 1999). ISBN 0 415 189593

Re-constructing the Book edited by Maureen Bell, Simon Eliot, Lynette Hunter and James West (Burlington, VT: Ashgate, 2001). ISBN 978-0-7546-0360-3

Literary Cultures and the Material Book, edited by Simon Eliot, Andrew Nash and Ian Willison (London: British Library Publications, 2007). ISBN 978-0-7123-0684-3

The Blackwell Companion to the History of the Book, edited by Simon Eliot and Jonathan Rose (Oxford: Blackwell, 2007). ISBN 978-1-4051-2765-3 [Paperback edition 2009.] .

The History of Oxford University Press, General Editor Simon Eliot, Volume I (edited by Ian Gadd) Beginnings to 1780; Volume II (edited by Simon Eliot) 1780-1896; Volume III (edited by Wm. Roger Louis) 1896-1970 (Oxford: Oxford University Press, 2013). ISBN 978-0-19-955731-8, 978-0-19-954315-1 and 978-0-19-56840-6

The History of Oxford University Press, General Editor Simon Eliot, Volume IV (edited by Keith Robbins) 1970-2004 (Oxford: Oxford University Press, 2017). ISBN 978-0-19-957479-7

Companion to the History of the Book, second edition, edited by Simon Eliot and Jonathan Rose, 2 volumes (Oxford: Wiley-Blackwell, 2019). ISBN 978-1-119-01817-9

Allied Communication to the Public during the Second World War, edited by Simon Eliot and Marc Wiggam (London: Bloomsbury Academic, 2020). ISBN 978-1-350-10512-6

Information at War, edited by Simon Eliot and Henry Irving (Oxford: Oxford University Press, 2026). ISBN 978-0-19-284473-6

=== Articles and chapters ===
Simon Eliot, `Numbers, Season, Subject and Price: Some Trends in British Publishing 1800-1919' in Literature in the Marketplace: Nineteenth-Century Publishing and the Circulation of Books edited by John Jordan and Robert Patten (Cambridge: Cambridge University Press, 1995), pp. 19-43. ISBN 978-0-521-45247-2

Simon Eliot, ‘ “Mr. Greenhill, whom you cannot get rid of ”: Copyright, Legal Deposit and the Stationers’ Company in the 19th Century’, a chapter in Libraries and the Book Trade edited by Robin Myers, Michael Harris and Giles Mandelbrote (Winchester: St Pauls Bibliographies, 2000), pp. 51-84. ISBN 978-1-873040-60-7

Simon Eliot, ‘The Business of Victorian Publishing’ in The Cambridge Companion to the Victorian Novel, edited by Deirdre A. David (Cambridge: Cambridge University Press, 2000), pp. 37-60. ISBN 978-0-521-64150-0, 978-0-521-64619-2

Simon Eliot, ‘ “Hotten, Rotten, Forgotten”?: An Apologia for a General Publisher’ in Book History (Pennsylvania: Penn State Press, 2000), pp. 61-93. ISBN 978-0-271-02050-1

Simon Eliot, ‘ “To you in your vast business”: Some Features of the Quantitative History of Macmillan 1843-1891’ in Macmillan: A Publishing Tradition, edited by Elizabeth James (Basingstoke: Palgrave, 2002), pp. 11-51. ISBN 978-0-333-73517-6

Simon Eliot, ‘Circulating Libraries in the Victorian Age and After’ in A History of Libraries in Britain & Ireland, Volume 3 Libraries and Information in the Modern World edited by Alistair Black and Peter Hoare (Cambridge: Cambridge University Press, 2006). ISBN 978-0-521-78097-1

Simon Eliot, ‘Some Material Factors in Literary Culture 2500 BCE-1900 CE’ in Literary Cultures and the Material Book, edited by Simon Eliot, Andrew Nash and Ian Willison (London: British Library Publications, 2007). ISBN 978-0-7123-0684-3

Simon Eliot, ‘1825-6: Years of Crisis?’ in The History of the Book in Scotland, Volume 3 1800-1880 edited by Bill Bell (Edinburgh: Edinburgh University Press, 2007). ISBN 978-0-7486-2881-0

Simon Eliot, ‘Reading by Artificial Light in the Victorian Age’ in Matthew Bradley and Juliet John (eds.), Reading and the Victorians (Farnham: Ashgate, 2015), pp. 15-30. ISBN 978-1-4094-4080-2

Simon Eliot, ‘The Ministry of Information: Readers and their Reading in the early 1940s’ in M. Hammond and J. Rose (eds.), The Edinburgh History of Reading (Edinburgh: Edinburgh University Press, 2018). ISBN 978-1-4744-4611-2

Simon Eliot, ‘Recasting Book History’ in Cynthia Johnston (ed.) The Concept of the Book (London: Institute of English Studies, 2019), pp. 7-33. ISBN 978-0-9927257-4-7
