= Port Eliot =

Country house in St Germans, Cornwall, England

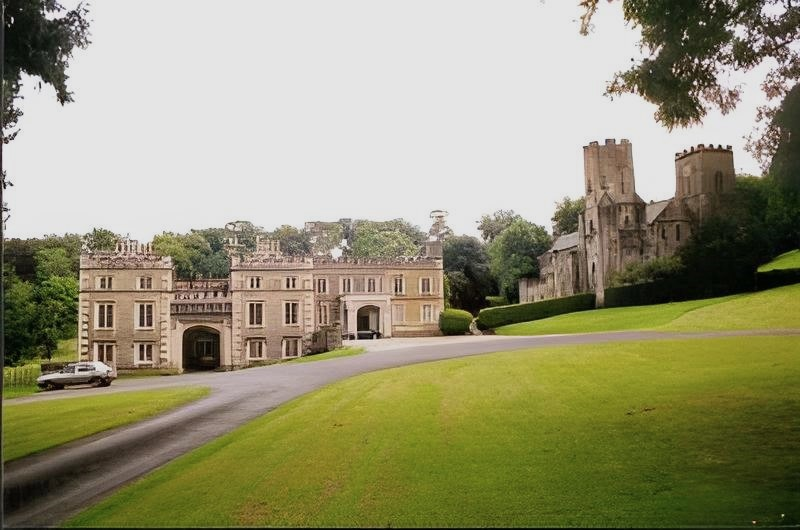
- Port Eliot and St Germans Church

- Location within Cornwall
- 50.39706°N 4.30931°W
- Location: St Germans, Cornwall, England

Listed Building – Grade I
- Official name: Port Eliot House
- Designated: 21 July 1951
- Reference no.: 1140516

Listed Building – Grade II*
- Official name: Town Lodge
- Designated: 23 January 1968
- Reference no.: 1311300

National Register of Historic Parks and Gardens
- Official name: Port Eliot
- Designated: 11 June 1987
- Reference no.: 1000426

Port Eliot in the parish of St Germans, Cornwall, England, United Kingdom, is the ancestral seat of the Eliot family, whose present head is Albert Eliot, 11th Earl of St Germans.

Port Eliot comprises a stately home with its own church, which serves as the parish church of St Germans. An earlier church building was Cornwall's principal cathedral. The house is within an estate of 6,000-acre (2,400 ha) which extends into the neighbouring villages of Tideford, Trerulefoot and Polbathic. Both house and garden are Grade I listed.

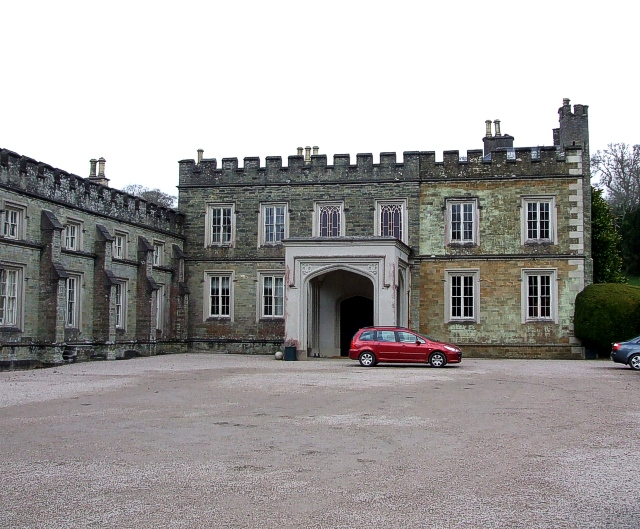
The main entrance to Port Eliot

== History ==
Originally built as a priory with adjoining St Germans Priory Church, parts of the house date back to the 12th century. It was substantially altered and remodelled in the 17th and 18th centuries by noted architects, including Sir John Soane.

In the 18th and 19th centuries, the Eliot family invested substantially in the estate, building numerous farmhouses, fishermen's cottages and other dwellings across the land. Many of these remain part of the estate to this day, and they are rented out to local residents and friends of the family. Some properties, mainly lying remote from the estate, have been sold in recent years. In 2014, 1,800-acres (700-hectares) of the estate was purchased by the Duchy of Cornwall.

== Festivals ==
=== Elephant Fayre ===
In 1980 a small festival which had outgrown its site at Polgooth in mid-Cornwall approached the Port Eliot estate and asked if it could be held in the idyllic grounds. The estate office agreed a price, and there began the Elephant Fayre, one of the most eclectic festivals of the 1980s. The festival ran from 1981 to 1986, beginning with some 1,500 visitors over four days, and featured a mix of music, theatre and visual arts.

Over the years the festival grew, attracting crowds of up to 30,000 and bands such as The Cure, The Fall and Siouxsie and the Banshees. The burning down of the oldest tree in the park, looting of the village surgery and the robbing of stall-holders in 1985 prompted Lord Eliot and fellow organisers to make the 1986 festival the last.

=== Port Eliot Festival ===
In 2003 Peregrine Eliot, 10th Earl of St Germans began the Port Eliot Lit Fest in Cornwall. Which carried on as Port Eliot Festival until 2019.

== Public access ==
In March 2008 the house and grounds opened to the public for the first time, for 100 days, and attracted 12,000 visitors. There is a shop and cafe with gardens open all year round. Guided tours of the house are available.

== Gallery ==
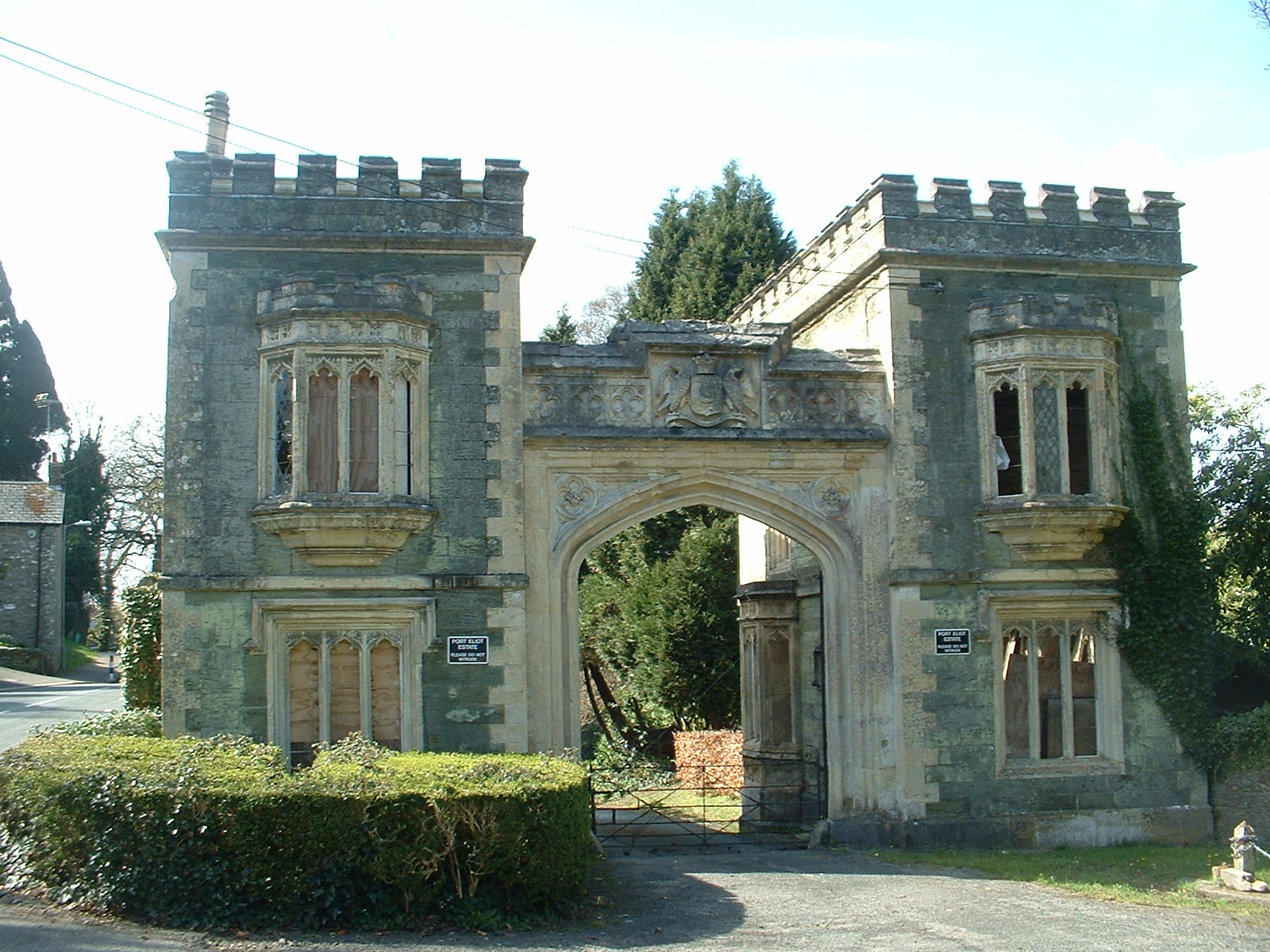

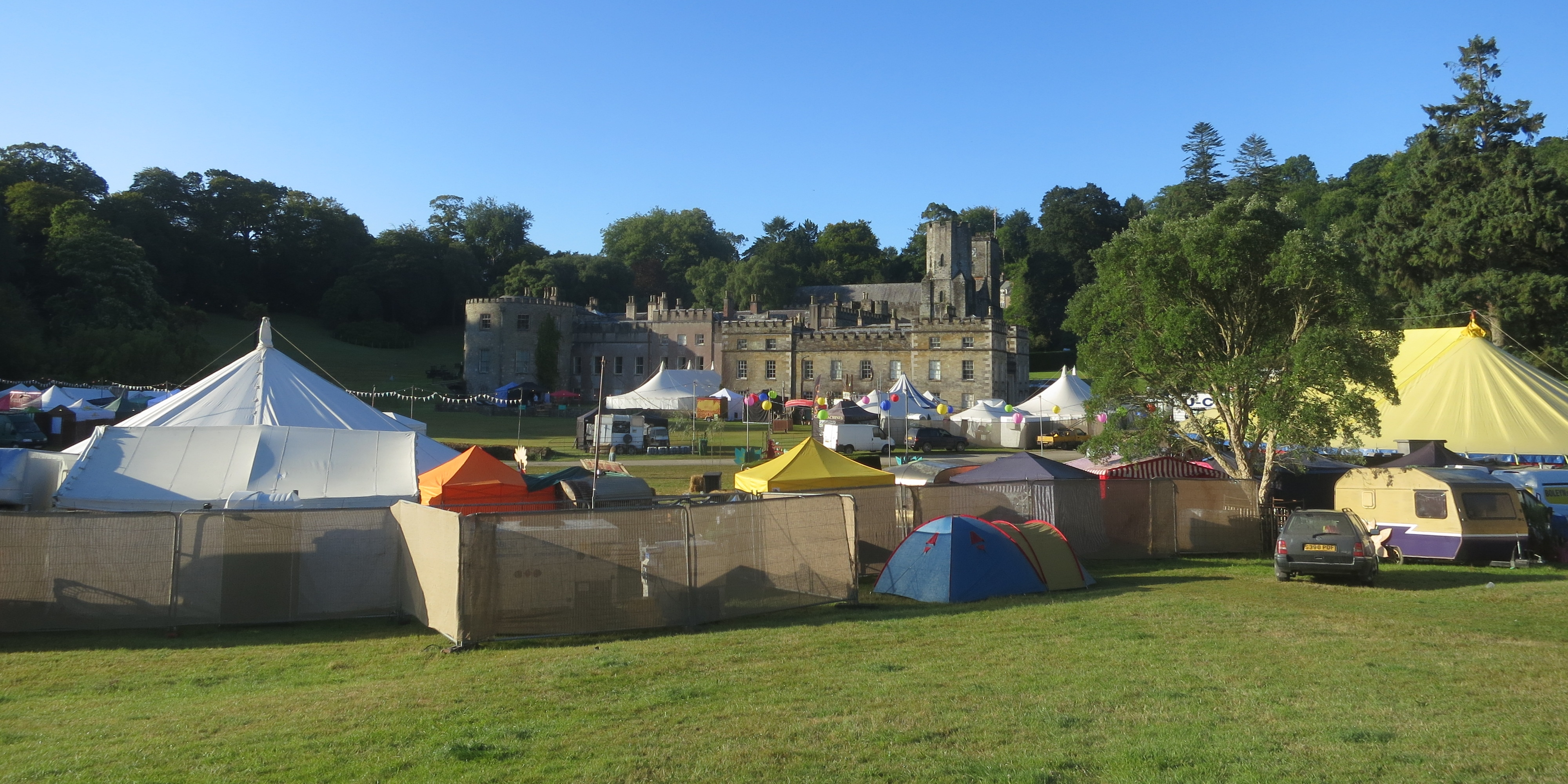

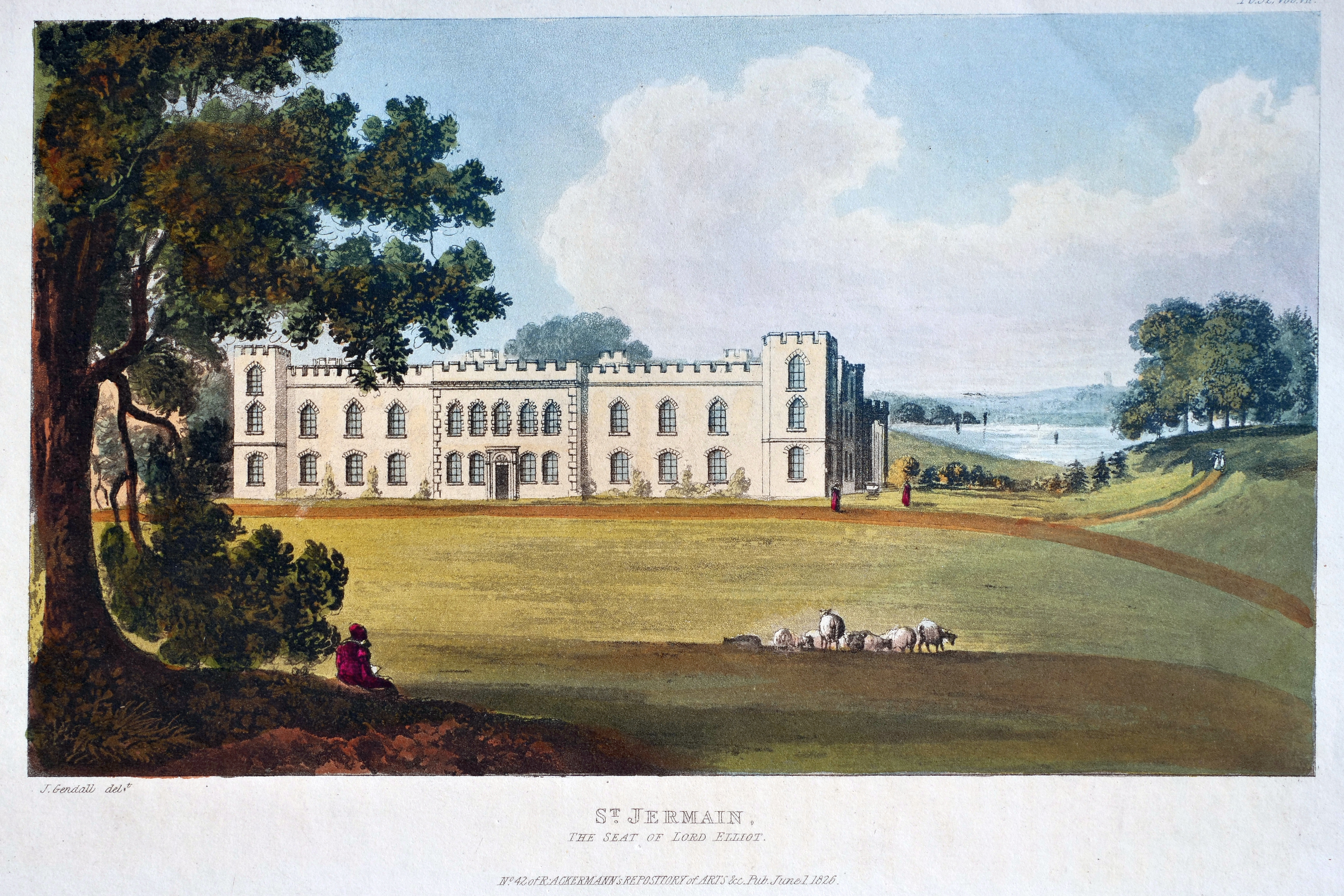

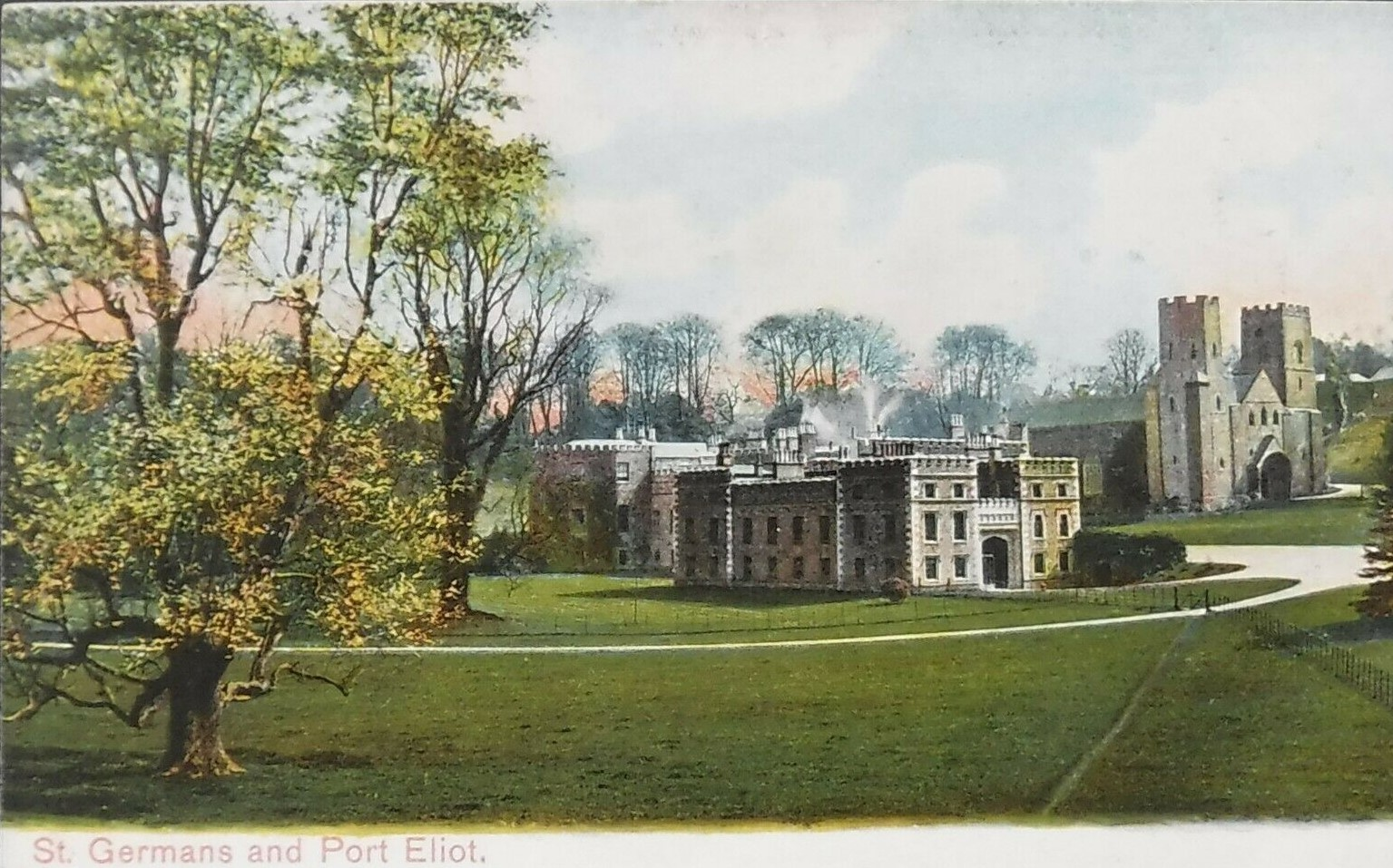

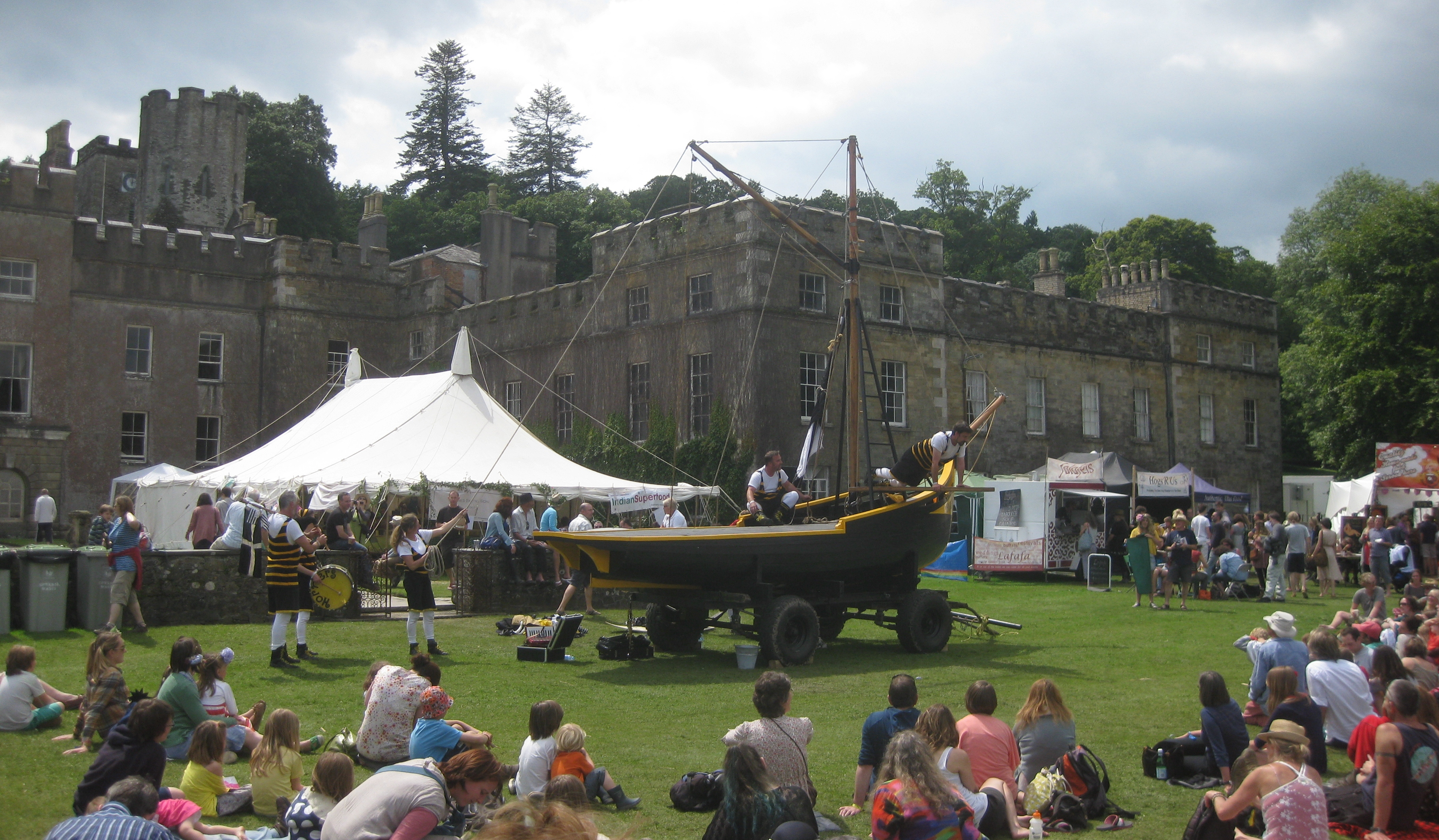
