= Eliot family (United States) =

American family prominent in arts and academia

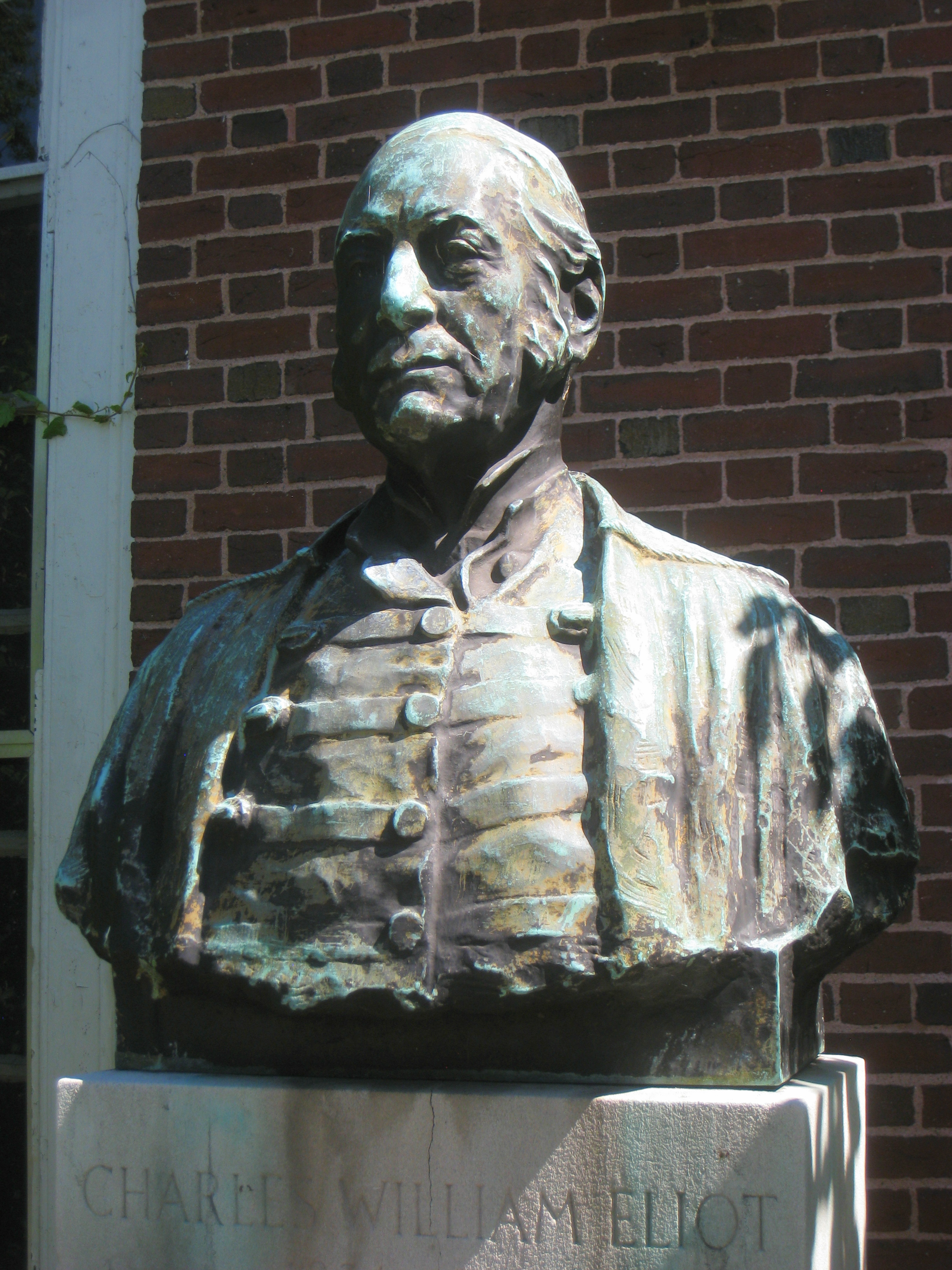
Bust of Charles William Eliot, President of Harvard University, at Eliot House on the campus

The Eliot family is a formerly prominent American family hailing from Massachusetts. Long associated with Boston and Harvard University, the family are members of the Boston Brahmin class that historically formed the economic and political elite of New England until the mid-20th century.

The family's membership has included several influential college presidents, writers, professors, bankers, and leaders of American professional associations. The writer T. S. Eliot, considered one of the 20th century's greatest poets, was a member of the family, as was Charles W. Eliot, the Harvard president credited with transforming the institution from a provincial college to a renowned research university.

== Family history ==
=== Origins ===
The family's paternal ancestors emigrated from East Coker, Somerset, England. All family members descend from two men, both named Andrew Eliot, father and son, who emigrated from England to Beverly, Massachusetts between 1668 and 1670. The elder Andrew (1627 – March 1, 1704) served the town and colony in a number of positions and in 1692 was chosen as a juror in the Salem witch trials. His son Andrew (1651 – September 12, 1688) married Mercy Shattuck in 1680 in Beverly and died by drowning after falling off a ship.

The poet T. S. Eliot, who spent much of his life in England, titled the poem East Coker after the village of the family's origin. Upon his death, his ashes were interred in St Michael and All Angels' Church in East Coker, the birthplace of his Eliot ancestors.

=== Rise to prominence ===
Members of the Eliot family achieved success in myriad fields, including banking, politics, academia, and the arts. Samuel Eliot, born to modest circumstances, built one of the largest fortunes in Boston. His granddaughter, Mary Elizabeth Bray, married Johann Heinrich Gossler III, whose family owned Berenberg Bank; their descendants would be barons, senators, and consuls in Europe.

Charles W. Eliot's tenure as president of Harvard University was monumental, leading Theodore Roosevelt to refer to him as "the only man in the world I envy". Branches of the family migrated westward, and were instrumental in the founding of Washington University in St. Louis and Reed College.

Thomas Stearns Eliot, better known as T. S. Eliot, was awarded the 1948 Nobel Prize in Literature.

Throughout the 20th century, Martha May Eliot, Abigail Adams Eliot, and Clara Eliot achieved prominence in the fields of public health, early childhood education, and economics, respectively.

=== Other families with the surname Eliot ===
A number of Americans who share the last name Eliot descend from Reverend John Eliot of Roxbury, Massachusetts, a Puritan missionary known as the "Apostle to the Indians". These include the Reverend John Eliot's son John Eliot, Jr., who served as the first pastor of the First Church of Christ in Newton, Massachusetts; Joseph Eliot, a pastor in Guilford, Connecticut; and Joseph's son Jared Eliot, a pastor and agricultural writer. As Henry James noted in his biography of Charles W. Eliot, no connection has been traced between the two families.

== Notable members ==
=== Arts, architecture, and literature ===
- Charles Eliot (1859–1897), landscape architect
- Charles Eliot Norton, scholar and man of letters
- Samuel Atkins Eliot Jr., novelist, son of Samuel Atkins Eliot II
- Theodore Lyman Eliot I, president of San Francisco Art Institute and brother-in-law of Navy commander Albert Bigelow, the peace activist
- Thomas Stearns Eliot (better known as T. S. Eliot), Nobel laureate, poet, playwright, literary critic and publisher

=== Business and banking ===
- Henry Ware Eliot, businessman and president of the Academy of Science, St. Louis
- Samuel Eliot, Boston banker and merchant, president of Massachusetts Bank, one of the richest men in Boston

=== Education and academia ===
- Charles William Eliot, president of Harvard University
- Clara Eliot, economist at Barnard College
- Charles Eliot Pierce, Jr., director of Morgan Library & Museum
- Ida M. Eliot, writer, educator, philosopher, and entomologist
- John Eliot, co-founder of the Massachusetts Historical Society with Jeremy Belknap, the first such historical society of its kind
- Samuel Eliot, historian, educator, trustee of Massachusetts General Hospital, Museum of Fine Arts (Boston), the American Academy of Arts and Sciences and the Massachusetts Historical Society
- Samuel Eliot Morison, historian, rear admiral, United States Naval Reserve
- Rev. Thomas Lamb Eliot, seminal in the founding of Reed College where he served as regent and trustee
- William Greenleaf Eliot, co-founder and third chancellor of Washington University in St. Louis

=== Politics and diplomacy ===
- Andrew Eliot Rice, key force behind the creation of the Peace Corps and founder of the Society for International Development
- Samuel Atkins Eliot, senator, mayor of Boston, treasurer of Harvard University, served in the United States House of Representatives, Massachusetts House of Representatives, and Massachusetts Senate
- Thomas Dawes Eliot, U.S. Congressman from Massachusetts, brother of William Greenleaf Eliot
- Thomas H. Eliot, chancellor of Washington University in St. Louis (1962–1971), U.S. Congressman (1941–1943)
- Theodore Lyman Eliot II, diplomat, United States Ambassador to Afghanistan (1973–1978), Executive Secretary of the United States Department of State (1969–1973)

=== Religion ===
- Andrew Eliot, prominent Boston Congregational minister during the Siege of Boston
- Christopher Rhodes Eliot, Unitarian minister and author
- Frederick May Eliot, president of the American Unitarian Association (1937–1958)
- Samuel Atkins Eliot II, president of the American Unitarian Association (1900–1927)

=== Science and medicine ===
- Edward Samuel Ritchie, inventor and physicist, great-grandson of Andrew Eliot, the Boston minister
- Joan R. Rosenblatt (née Joan Eliot Raup), statistician at the National Institute of Standards and Technology, daughter of Clara Eliot
- Martha May Eliot, a pediatrician and expert in public health; she served as director of the Children’s Bureau’s Division of Child and Maternal Health in the 1920s and 1930s, and is credited with drafting language on women and children in the Social Security Act. Martha May Eliot lived a quiet but public life as a lesbian with her lifelong domestic partner, Ethel Collins Dunham

=== Other notable figures ===
- Edward Cranch Eliot, president of the American Bar Association

== Family tree ==
Descendants of Andrew Eliot (1627–1704) and his son Andrew Eliot (1651–1688) include:

- Andrew Eliot (c. 1683 – 1749)
  - Samuel Eliot (1713–1745) m. Elizabeth Marshall (1714–1767)
    - Samuel Eliot (1739–1820)
      - Francis Eliot (1776–1820) m. Joseph Bray
        - Mary Elizabeth Bray (1810–1886) m. Johann Heinrich Gossler III (1805–1879)
          - Baron Johann von Berenberg-Gossler (1839–1913) m. Juliane Amalie Donner (1843–1916)
            - John von Berenberg-Gossler (1866–1943)
            - Frances von Berenberg-Gossler (1868–1951) m. Baron Hans von Berlepsch
            - Baron Cornelius von Berenberg-Gossler (1874–1953) m. Nadia Clara von Oesterreich
              - Clara Nadia von Berenberg-Gossler (born 1899; death date unknown) m. Emmo von Specht
              - Cornelius Johann Constantin von Berenberg-Gossler (1901–1942)
              - Cornelia Nadia Julie von Berenberg-Gossler (born 1905; death date unknown)
              - Baron Heinrich von Berenberg-Gossler (1907–1997)
                - Baron Cornelius von Berenberg-Gossler
                - Heinrich von Berenberg-Gossler
              - Cornelius Johann Heinrich Hellmuth von Berenberg-Gossler (born 1909; death date unknown) m. Irmgard Else Meyer
                - Cornelius Johann Heinrich Gerhard von Berenberg-Gossler
                - Clarita Irmela Nadia von Berenberg-Gossler m. Count Hartwig (Rabe) Joachim Cornelius Alexander von Bernstorff
              - Cornelius Paul Hellmuth von Berenberg-Gossler (born 1911; death date unknown) m. Maria Luise Francke
                - Johann David Rudolf Cornelius von Berenberg-Gossler
                - Alexander John von Berenberg-Gossler
              - Nadia von Berenberg-Gossler
            - Andreas von Berenberg-Gossler (1880–1938) m. Agnes Victorina von Francois
              - Maria Nadia von Berenberg-Gossler (born 1908; death date unknown)
            - Herbert von Berenberg-Gossler (1883–1918) m. Anna Jutta Sara Elisabeth von Mallinckrodt
      - Catherine Eliot (1793–1879) m. Andrews Norton (1786–1853)
        - Charles Eliot Norton (1827–1908)
      - William Havard Eliot (1796–1831)
        - Samuel Eliot (Historian) (1821–1898)
          - Emily Marshall (Eliot) Morison (1857–1925) m. John Holmes Morison (1856–1911)
            - Samuel Eliot Morison (1887–1976) m. Elizabeth S. Greene
              - Emily Morison Beck (1915–2004) m. Brooks Beck
      - Samuel Atkins Eliot (1798–1862)
        - Charles William Eliot (1834–1926) m. Ellen Derby Peabody (1836–1869)
          - Charles Eliot (1859–1897)
          - Samuel A. Eliot II (1862–1950) m. Frances Stone Hopkinson
            - Samuel Atkins Eliot Jr. (1893–1984)
            - Rosamond (Eliot) Rice (1895–1970) m. William Gorham Rice, Jr. (1891–1964)
              - Andrew Eliot Rice (1922–2010)
            - Theodore Lyman Eliot I (1903–1996) m. Martha Bigelow
              - Theodore Lyman Eliot Jr. (1928–2019)
            - Thomas Hopkinson Eliot (1907–1991) m. Lois Jameson
  - Andrew Eliot (1718–1778)
    - Samuel Eliot (1748–1784) m. Elizabeth Greenleaf (1750–1841)
      - Elizabeth Eliot (1774–1847) m. John Ritchie (1768–1838)
        - Edward Samuel Ritchie (1814–1895)
      - William Greenleaf Eliot (1781–1853) m. Margaret Greenleaf (Dawes) (1789 – c. 1875)
        - Thomas Dawes Eliot (1808–1870)
          - Ida M. Eliot (1839–1923)
        - William Greenleaf Eliot (1811–1887) m. Abigail Adams (Cranch) Eliot (1817–1908)
          - Mary Rhodes Eliot (1838–1855) namesake of Mary Institute
          - Thomas Lamb Eliot (1841–1936)
            - William Greenleaf Eliot Jr (1866–1956)
              - Clara Eliot (1896–1976) m. Robert Bruce Raup (1888–1976)
                - Joan Raup Rosenblatt (1926–2018)
          - Henry Ware Eliot (1843–1919) m. Charlotte Champe Stearns (1843–1929)
            - Thomas Stearns Eliot (1888–1965), better known as T. S. Eliot
          - Christopher Rhodes Eliot (1856–1945) m. Mary Jackson May
            - Frederick May Eliot (1889–1958)
            - Dr. Martha May Eliot (1891–1978) domestic partner Ethel Collins Dunham (1883–1969)
            - Abigail Adams Eliot
          - Edward Cranch Eliot (1858–1928)
