= Samuel Atkins Eliot =

Samuel Atkins Eliot may refer to:

- Samuel A. Eliot (minister) (1862–1950), American Unitarian minister
- Samuel Atkins Eliot (politician) (1798–1862), U.S. Representative from Massachusetts
- Samuel Atkins Eliot Jr. (1893–1984), American author

== See also ==
- Eliot family (America)
- Samuel Eliot (disambiguation)
