= Samuel Eliot =

Samuel Eliot may refer to:

- Samuel Eliot (historian) (1821–1898). American historian and educator
- Samuel A. Eliot (minister) (1862–1950), American Unitarian clergyman
- Samuel Atkins Eliot (politician) (1798–1862), U.S. Representative from Massachusetts
- Samuel Atkins Eliot Jr. (1893–1984), American author
- Samuel Eliot (banker) (1739–1820), American merchant and banker
- Samuel Elliott, Australian pastoralist and politician
- Samuel Mackenzie Elliott (1811–1875), Scottish-American doctor
- Sam Elliott (cricketer) (born 2000), Australian cricketer
- Sam Elliott (born 1944), American actor

== See also ==
- Samuel Eliot Morison (1887–1976), American historian, author and naval officer
- Samuel Elliott Hoskins (1799–1888), physician
