= Kappa Pi Kappa =

Local fraternity at Dartmouth College, U.S.

- ΚΠΚ
- Founded: July 13, 1842; 184 years ago Dartmouth College
- Type: Social
- Affiliation: Independent
- Status: Active
- Scope: Local
- Motto: Tui Filii Dartmuthensi Tuoque Honori Fidelis
- Colors: Dartmouth Green
- Chapters: 1
- Nickname: Pi Kap
- Headquarters: 1 Webster Avenue; Hanover, New Hampshire 03755; United States; 43.70628°N 72.29004°W
- Website: kappapikappa.org

Kappa Pi Kappa (ΚΠΚ), also known as Pi Kap and formerly known as Kappa Kappa Kappa (colloquially as Tri-Kap) and briefly as Kappa Chi Kappa, is a local men's fraternity at Dartmouth College in Hanover, New Hampshire. The fraternity was founded in 1842 and is the second-oldest fraternity at Dartmouth College.

== History ==
Kappa Pi Kappa was founded on July 13, 1842, by Harrison Carroll Hobart and two of his closest companions, Stephen Gordon Nash, and John Dudley Philbrick, all Class of 1842. The society was based on the principles of democracy, loyalty to Dartmouth, and equality of opportunity. Originally a literary and debate society, Pi Kap officially became a social society in 1905 and has remained so ever since, making it the oldest extant local fraternity in the country.

Due to the similarity of the society's Greek initials with the Latin/English initials of the unaffiliated Ku Klux Klan, Kappa Kappa Kappa changed its name to Kappa Chi Kappa (ΚΧΚ) for a period from April 1992 to October 1995, at which point the name changed back to Kappa Kappa Kappa.

Following a period of consensus-building among the brotherhood's alumni, on May 18, 2022, the fraternity again changed its name, this time to Kappa Pi Kappa (ΚΠΚ).

== Symbols ==
Kappa Pi Kappa's motto is Tui Filii Dartmuthensi Tuoque Honori Fidelis. Its color is Dartmouth Green. Its nickname is Pi Kap.

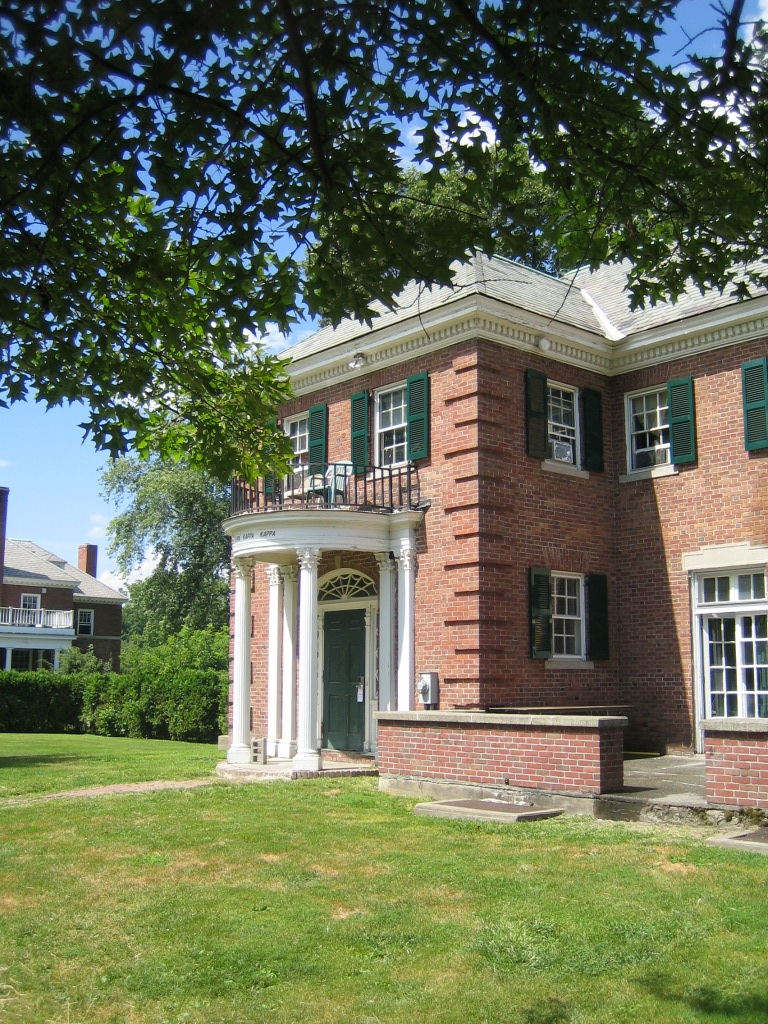
Chapter house, 1 Webster Avenue

== Chapter house ==
The fraternity was the first student society at Dartmouth with its own meeting place, a building called The Hall, which was originally where the Hopkins Center for the Arts is today. Opened on July 28, 1860, the Hall served as Pi-Kap's home until the society moved into the Parker House in 1894. Parker House was where the modern-day Silsby Hall is. In 1923, the society moved into 1 Webster Avenue in Hanover, where it resides to this day.

== Notable members ==
Graduating class in parentheses

- Walter Sydney Adams, (1898) American astronomer, director Mount Wilson Observatory
- Alex M. Azar (1988), Secretary of U.S. Department of Health and Human Services
- Henry Moore Baker (1863), member of the New Hampshire House, New Hampshire Senate, and the United States House of Representatives
- John Barrett (1889), diplomat and first director general of the Bureau of American Republics (predecessor to Organization of American States)
- Charles Henry Bell (1844), U.S. Senator and Governor of New Hampshire
- Lewis Boss (1870), astronomer and director of Dudley Observatory
- Nelson P. Brown (1899), judge Massachusetts Superior Court
- Henry Eben Burnham (1865), U.S. Senator from New Hampshire
- Sherman Everett Burroughs (1894), U.S. Congressman from New Hampshire
- Walter Tenney Carleton (1891), founding director of NEC Corporation
- Charles Carroll Colby (1847), President of the King's Privy Council for Canada (1889–1891)
- Channing H. Cox (1901), Governor of Massachusetts
- Louis Cox (1896), justice of the Massachusetts Supreme Judicial Court
- John Franklin Crowell (1883), president of (1887–1894) Trinity College (predecessor Duke University)
- Irving Webster Drew (1870), U.S. Senator from New Hampshire
- Edwin G. Eastman (1874), first Attorney General of New Hampshire
- Samuel D. Felker (1882), Governor of New Hampshire
- Michael Fisch (1983), Chair of Board of Trustees Princeton Theological Seminary and founder of American Securities
- John M. Gile (1887), member Executive Council of New Hampshire 1911-1913
- Daniel Wheelwright Gooch (1843) U.S. Congressman from Massachusetts
- Winfield Scott Hammond (1884), Governor of Minnesota
- Frank A. Haskell (1854), Colonel 36th Wisconsin Volunteers, author of famous first-hand account of the Battle of Gettysburg
- Harrison Carroll Hobart (1842), Democratic politician, Union Army officer during the American Civil War, founder Kappa Kappa Kappa
- Homer Hulbert (1884), missionary, journalist, linguist, and Korean independence activist.
- Nick Lowery (1978), National Football League player and three-time Pro Bowl kicker
- Andrew Marshall, football player and Assistant Attorney General of Massachusetts
- Samuel Walker McCall (1874), Governor of Massachusetts
- Stephen Gordon Nash, namesake and funder of Gordon-Nash Library, founder Kappa Kappa Kappa
- James E. Odlin (1881), member Massachusetts House of Representatives
- Paul Donnelly Paganucci (1953), professor at the Tuck School
- John Henry Patterson (1867), industrialist and founder of National Cash Register, now NCR Corporation
- John Dudley Philbrick (1842), superintendent of Boston Public Schools, founder Kappa Kappa Kappa
- Nitya Pibulsonggram (1962), Foreign Minister of Thailand and former Thai ambassador to the United States
- Ambrose A. Ranney (1844), U.S. Congressman from Massachusetts
- Peter Robinson (1979), White House speechwriter for President Ronald Reagan
- David Rosenbaum (1963), New York Times journalist
- Bob Smith (1902), co-founder of Alcoholics Anonymous
- Douglas Walgren (1963), U.S. Congressman from Pennsylvania
- Myron E. Witham (1904), football player, coach of football and baseball, and mathematics professor
- Thomas W. D. Worthen (1872), Dartmouth professor and member New Hampshire Public Service Commission

=== Honorary alumni ===
- Hugh M. Alcorn State's attorney in Hartford County, Connecticut
- Joseph M. Bell New Hampshire and Massachusetts lawyer, abolitionist, and politician
- Lewis Cass, Governor of Michigan, U.S. Senator, and presidential nominee
- Robert N. Chamberlain, Speaker of the New Hampshire House of Representatives, and as an Associate Justice and later as the second Chief Justice of the New Hampshire Superior Court
- Rufus Choate (1819), U.S. Senator from Massachusetts
- Daniel Clark (1834), U.S. Senator from New Hampshire
- Sidney Fay American historian specializing in World War I.
- Benjamin Franklin Flanders (1842), Governor of Louisiana
- Charles Brickett Haddock, New Hampshire educator, author, politician and civil servant. Founding advisor Kappa Kappa Kappa
- George Perkins Marsh, American diplomat and philologist
- Ira Perley, Chief justice of the New Hampshire Superior Court of Judicature 1855–1859 and 1864–1869
- Daniel Webster (1801), U.S. Senator from Massachusetts, U.S. Congressman, U.S.Ambassador to France, and U.S. Secretary of State
- Levi Woodbury (1809), Governor of New Hampshire, U.S. Senator, U.S. Secretary of the Treasury, and U.S. Supreme Court justice

== See also ==
- Campus of Dartmouth College
- Dartmouth College fraternities and sororities
- List of social fraternities
