= Ida M. Eliot =

American philosopher (1839–1923)

- Born: Ida Mitchel Eliot; October 9, 1836; Boston, Massachusetts, US
- Died: 1923 (aged 86–87); New Bedford, Massachusetts, US
- Occupations: Educator, feminist
- Parent: Thomas D. Eliot

Ida M. Eliot (October 9, 1839 – 1923) was an American writer, educator, philosopher, and entomologist who published one of the first books on caterpillars, Caterpillars and Their Moths (1902), with Caroline Soule.

== Early life and career ==
Eliot was born in October 9, 1839 in New Bedford, Massachusetts to Congressman Thomas D. Eliot and Frances Brock Eliot. Eliot graduated from the Salem Normal School (now Salem State University) in Salem, Massachusetts. Eliot then moved to St. Louis, Missouri where her uncle, William Greenleaf Eliot, was a prominent minister and philanthropist. She earned a Missouri Teacher's Certificate in 1864, and after the Civil War, Eliot founded a school for freed African American students in a church basement in St. Louis. She served as assistant principal of the St. Louis Normal School (now Harris-Stowe State College) under her close friend, Anna Brackett. Eliot and Brackett associated with the St. Louis Hegelians, and both women later published philosophical works. In 1872, when Anna Brackett resigned as principal, Eliot moved with Brackett to New York City. With Brackett, Eliot adopted a three-year-old daughter, Hope Davison, in 1873 and a second daughter, Bertha Lincoln, in 1875. In 1872, while in New York, Brackett and Eliot started The Brackett School for Girls, located at 9 West 39th Street, and they hired female teachers such as Mary Mitchell Birchall, the first woman to receive a bachelor's degree from a New England college. Eliot's adopted daughter, Hope, went on to graduate from college. By 1900, Ida had moved back to New Bedford with her daughter, Ida, and sister, Edith. In 1923, Eliot fractured her spine, leading to her death at St. Luke's Hospital on July 2, 1923. She is buried at Oak Grove Cemetery in New Bedford, Massachusetts.

== Notable works ==
- Poetry for Home and School (1876)
- Caterpillars and Their Moths (1902)

== Bibliography ==
- Rogers, Dorothy G. (2005). America's First Women Philosophers: Transplanting Hegel, 1860–1925. Continuum. ISBN 978-1-84714-300-6.
