= Jeremy Belknap =

American historian

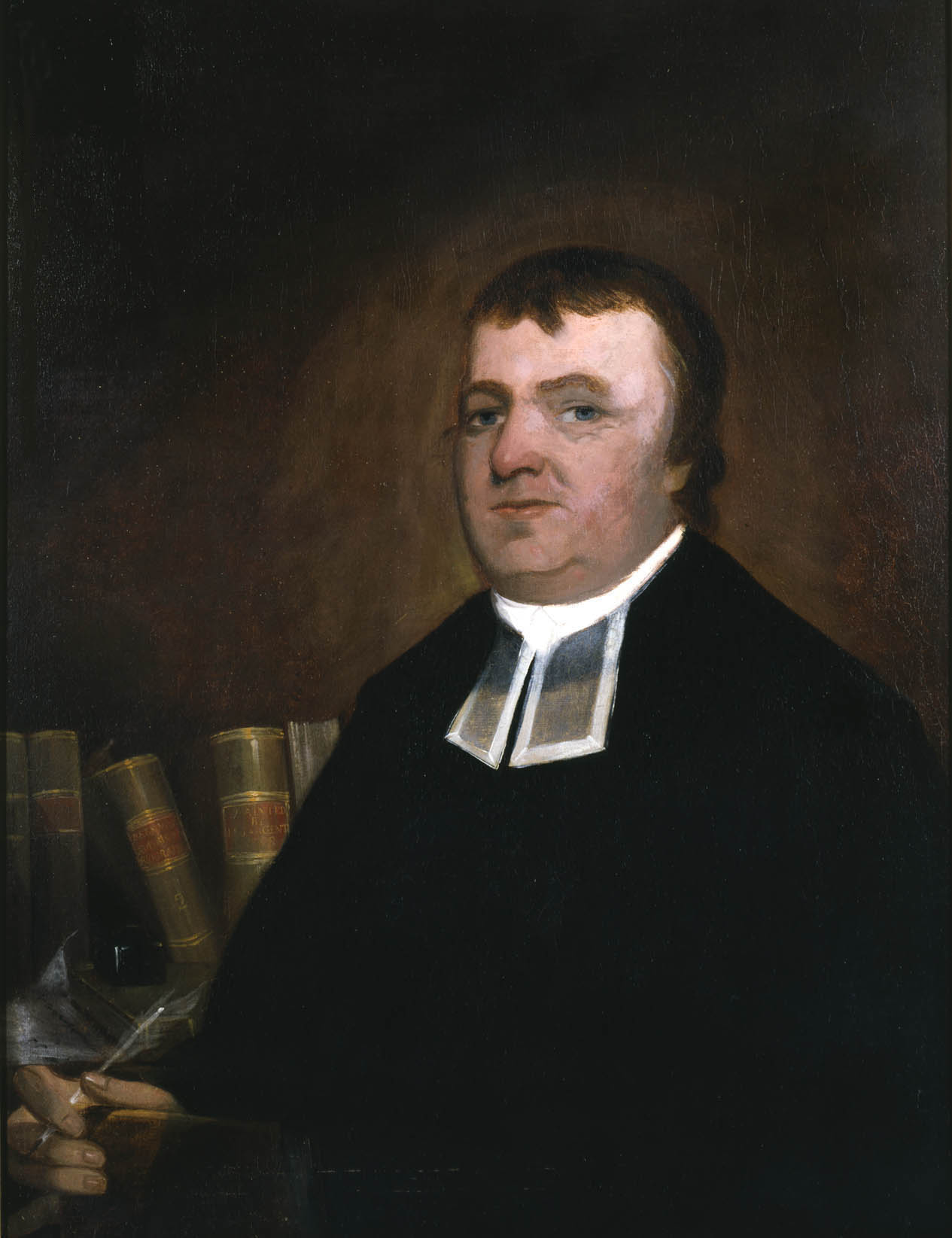
- Portrait by Henry Sargent, 1798
- Born: June 4, 1744; Boston, Province of Massachusetts Bay
- Died: June 20, 1798 (aged 54); Boston, Massachusetts
- Resting place: Mount Auburn Cemetery
- Occupations: clergyman and historian
- Known for: study of the History of New Hampshire, helping to found the Massachusetts Historical Society

Jeremy Belknap (June 4, 1744 – June 20, 1798) was an American clergyman and historian. His great achievement was the History of New Hampshire, published in three volumes between 1784 and 1792. This work is the first modern history written by an American, embodying a new rigor in research, annotation, and reporting.

== Early life ==
Belknap was born in Boston, Province of Massachusetts Bay, the son of a tanner. His uncle was Mather Byles, one of New England's intellectual leaders. Belknap was baptized by the historian Thomas Prince, another leading figure of 18th-century New England. He was educated at the Boston Latin School and Harvard College, where he graduated in 1762. In 1764 he moved to Portsmouth, New Hampshire, where he "kept the school" and studied theology with Samuel Haven (Harvard College class of 1749). In 1767 he began his ministry in Dover, New Hampshire, where he would spend twenty years at the Congregational Church. He also married that year and acquired a house in Dover.

After the Battle of Lexington in 1775 some units of the Dover militia were called out to support the Siege of Boston. Belknap accompanied them and remained through the next winter as chaplain to the New Hampshire troops involved with the siege.

== History of New Hampshire ==
Besides attending to his growing congregation, Belknap served as a secretary to the convention of New Hampshire ministers from 1769 until 1787. This position required travel throughout the state, and he used it as a chance to begin accumulating notes on the history of New Hampshire. In 1772 he began to write his history. In 1784 he published the first volume of the History of New Hampshire, but it would take until 1792 to complete the work. The work was not successful at first, and sales were disappointing, and did better around Boston than in New Hampshire. Its reputation grew over the years, however, and after his death, Alexis de Tocqueville named him as America's best native historian.

The History represented a new approach in its field. Besides just narrating events, he added two innovations. He tried to clearly separate facts from analysis and opinion, and he provided many annotations to show the source and location of records that he had inspected.

== Recognition ==
Besides his History, Belknap began work on an American biographical dictionary in 1779. This effort caused him to begin corresponding with many of the leading men of letters, politics, and religion throughout the colonies. He would eventually publish his American Biographies in two volumes in 1794 and 1798. In the meantime, his efforts brought him to the attention of intellectual leaders across the country.

Belknap was elected to the American Philosophical Society in 1784. In 1785 he was elected a Fellow of the American Academy of Arts and Sciences. This latter association also resulted in an offer to return to Boston.

== Massachusetts career ==
Belknap accepted a new position in 1787, when he moved back to Boston to become pastor of the Federal Street Church. He would serve there until his death. He remained active in research, writing, and promoting American history as a field.

He continued his quest into history, seeking ways to report and preserve historic sources. On January 24, 1791, he invited nine friends with similar interests to meet at his home. They agreed to help build a repository for these records. The meeting resulted in the Massachusetts Historical Society, which was the first historical society and served as a prototype for many later ones. They also pledged to contribute family papers. John Eliot, a fourth-generation descendant of the 17th-century "Apostle to the Indians" and himself a minister, added Governor Thomas Hutchinson's manuscript for the History of Massachusetts Bay, which his father Andrew Eliot had saved during the Revolution when a mob looted the governor's home.

In 1792 Belknap published his An Historical Account of those persons who have been distinguished in America, which was the first of a distinguished line of dictionaries of American biography. That same year, he became one of the overseers of Harvard University.

== Death and legacy ==
Belknap died in Boston and was buried at the Granary Burying Ground. His remains were later re-interred in Mount Auburn Cemetery in Cambridge, Massachusetts. Belknap County, New Hampshire, is named in his honor. He is featured on a New Hampshire historical marker (number 51) along the Spaulding Turnpike in Dover.
