= Anna Brackett =

American philosopher

Anna Callender Brackett
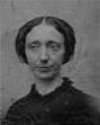
- c. 1900
- Born: May 21, 1836; Boston, Massachusetts, United States
- Died: March 18, 1911 (aged 85); Summit, New Jersey, United States
- Occupations: Educator, translator, feminism activist
- Partner: Ida M. Eliot
- Children: 2

Anna Callender Brackett (May 21, 1836 – March 18, 1911) was an American philosopher, translator, feminist, and educator. She translated Karl Rosenkranz's Pedagogics as a System and wrote The Education of American Girls, a response to arguments against the coeducation of males and females.

== Life ==
Born to Samuel and Caroline Brackett, she was the oldest of five children. Her father was a dry goods merchant on Milk Street in Boston, Massachusetts, and the family lived in Somerville. Brackett attended private and public schools in Boston and Somerville and Abbot Academy. In 1856 she graduated from the state teaching school in Framingham, Massachusetts, now known as Framingham State University. Brackett served as a teacher in East Brookfield, Massachusetts, and then as an assistant principal in the teaching school in Framingham. In 1861, she became vice principal in Charleston, South Carolina. At the start of the Civil War, she was forced to leave for New Orleans and then St. Louis where she met with the St. Louis Hegelians and later published the first English translation of several philosophical works. After briefly returning to Cambridge, Massachusetts, and teaching at the high school there, she then went back to St. Louis.

In 1863 she was appointed principal of the St. Louis Normal School (Harris-Stowe State College), the first female principal of secondary school in the United States. During her tenure, Brackett worked to ensure female students had access to higher education and liberal studies as preparation for professional teaching. She made two proposals to the Board of Education that were eventually adopted. The first proposal was an age requirement for entrance to the school. Second, there should be an entrance exam for admission to the St. Louis Normal School. In 1872, Brackett resigned as principal after there were changes in the curriculum that went against her beliefs. She moved to New York City with her domestic partner, Ida M. Eliot, the daughter of Congressman Thomas D. Eliot. The pair adopted their first daughter, Hope, in 1873 and their second daughter, Bertha, in 1875. In New York, Brackett started the Brackett School for Girls, located at 9 West 39th Street, and she hired female teachers such as Mary Mitchell Birchall, the first woman to receive a bachelor's degree from a New England college. Among Brackett's pupils was Ruth Sawyer, in whose Newbery Award-winning semi-autobiographical children's novel, Roller Skates.

Brackett retired from teaching in 1894 and died in 1911. A biography of Brackett was published upon her death, entitled: Anna C. Brackett, in Memoriam, MDCCCXXXVI-MDCCCCXI: An Appreciation (1915).

== Works ==
In 1874, Brackett published The Education of American Girls, an essay that applied Rosenkranz's theory of education to girls. In this essay, Brackett observes that a young woman must be guided through two steps of the learning process, the "perceptive stage" and "conceptual stage." In her opinion, no girl could excel in life without attaining both of these steps. Her thoughts were that an education which merely stops at the conceptual stage is not adequate. If undereducated and untrained in abstract thinking, women were at risk to becoming arbitrary if they were to become active in public affairs. Brackett made the point that if women are confined only to the family circle and taking care of the home, they will not be able to fully develop morally and intellectually. This would cause girls to lose their chance at asserting their independence or compete with others and gain the confidence needed to be successful in the public realm. Men, however, automatically entered into the public realm where they become independent persons, separate from the family. Brackett made the argument that without being able to grow outside their homes, women faced two dangers. The first danger is they grow to be ineffective in the public realm and perpetuate the stereotype of the "incompetent woman." The second danger is to a woman's well-being, risking becoming vulnerable to exploitation by men. This essay was the foundation to Brackett's belief that coeducation is important and necessary in the American education system.

Brackett wrote regarding education and philosophy and published writings in Harper's Magazine and other publications. She also published The Education of American Girls and served as an editor of New England Journal of Education.

== Bibliography ==
- Rogers, Dorothy G. (2005). America's First Women Philosophers: Transplanting Hegel, 1860-1925. Continuum. ISBN 978-1-84714-300-6.
