= Clara Eliot =

Economist

- Born: January 2, 1896; San Francisco, California, U.S.
- Died: January 17, 1976 (aged 80); Palo Alto, California, U.S.
- Known for: Work in consumer economics; The Farmer's Campaign for Credit
- Spouse: Robert Bruce Raup (m. 1924)
- Children: 2
- Relatives: Thomas Lamb Eliot (grandfather)

Academic background
- Education: Reed College; Columbia University (PhD 1926)

Academic work
- Discipline: Consumer economics
- Institutions: Mills College; Barnard College

Clara Raup (née Eliot; January 1, 1896 – January 17, 1976) was an American economist known for her work in consumer economics. She taught economics at Barnard College.

== Biography ==
Eliot was born in 1896, the granddaughter of Thomas Lamb Eliot and part of a prominent Unitarian branch of the Eliot family. She did her undergraduate studies at Reed College, which her grandfather had founded, graduating in 1917. She taught at Mills College from 1917 to 1918, and then worked as an assistant to Yale economist Irving Fisher from 1918 to 1920. She also worked as an elementary school teacher; one of her students from this time, Margaret E. Martin, grew up to become a noted economist.

As a graduate student in economics at Columbia University, Eliot met educational psychologist Robert Bruce Raup; they married in 1924, but Eliot continued to use her maiden name for professional purposes. She completed her doctorate in 1926, and became a faculty member at Barnard College. When her daughter Joan was born in 1926, she became the first woman at Barnard to obtain a maternity leave. Joan later became a statistician. Another daughter, Charlotte, married Columbia University historian Lawrence A. Cremin.

Eliot is the author of the book The Farmer's Campaign for Credit (1927),^{[A]} "a study of basic issues in credit theory as they were involved in United States agricultural policies early in this century". In the 1950s she tackled feminist issues with publications about the economic situation of widows (increasingly common after reductions in the rate of pregnancy-related deaths)^{[B]} and about the economics of marriage.^{[C]}

== Selected publications ==
| A. | Eliot, Clara (1927), The Farmer's Campaign for Credit, New York: D. Appleton and Company. |

| B. | Eliot, Clara (March 1958), "Widows in the American Economy", Challenge, 6 (6): 72–76, doi:10.1080/05775132.1958.11468663. |

| C. | Eliot, Clara (March 1959), "The Economics of Marriage", Challenge, 7 (6): 24–28, doi:10.1080/05775132.1959.11468864. |
