= Charlotte Champe Eliot =

American poet

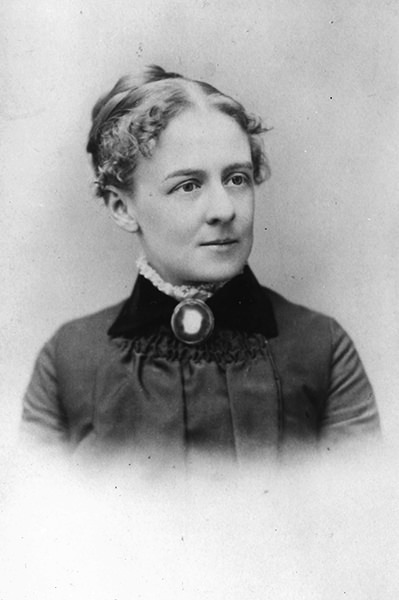
- Born: Charlotte Champe Stearns; October 22, 1843; Baltimore, Maryland, U.S.
- Died: September 10, 1929 (aged 85); Cambridge, Massachusetts, U.S.
- Occupations: Teacher; biographer; social worker
- Notable work: Savonarola; William Greenleaf Eliot: Minister, Educator, Philanthropist
- Spouse: Henry Ware Eliot (m. 1868; died 1919)
- Children: 7, including T. S. Eliot

Charlotte Champe Eliot (née Stearns; October 22, 1843 – September 10, 1929) was an American school teacher, poet, biographer, and social worker. She was the mother of T. S. Eliot, a famous poet, editor and literary critic, wife of Henry Ware Eliot, who ran the Hydraulic Press Brick Company in St. Louis, Missouri, and daughter-in-law of William Greenleaf Eliot, a leading minister in St. Louis and a founder of Washington University in St. Louis.

== Early life and education ==
Charlotte Champe Stearns was born in Baltimore, Maryland, the second daughter of nine children from her parents Charlotte Stearns (née Blood) and Thomas Stearns Jr. Her father, Thomas, was a merchant who lived in several cities, before he settled down as a partner in the trading firm of Stearns & Bailey in Boston, Massachusetts. Charlotte attended private school and graduated from the State Normal School of Framingham, Massachusetts in 1862. She was employed as a teacher at a private school in West Chester, Pennsylvania. Her teaching career led her to Pennsylvania and Milwaukee at Antioch College, back to Framingham and then to the St. Louis Normal School (now Harris–Stowe State University) in St. Louis, Missouri.

== Married life ==
Stearns married Henry Ware Eliot (1843 – 1919) on October 27, 1868, in Lexington, Massachusetts. They returned to Eliot's home city of St. Louis where they worked and reared their family. They had five daughters and two sons: Ada (Eliot) Sheffield, born in 1869; Margaret Dawes Eliot, born in 1871; Charlotte (Eliot) Smith, born in 1874; Marian Cushing Eliot, born in 1877; Henry Ware Eliot, Jr., born in 1879; Theodora Sterling Eliot, born in 1885 but died in infancy; and Thomas Stearns Eliot, born in 1888.

In the 1870s when her husband went bankrupt, Charlotte taught school at the nearby Mary Institute. Charlotte's youngest child, Thomas Stearns Eliot, would become well known as the poet T. S. Eliot.

== Life with T. S. Eliot ==
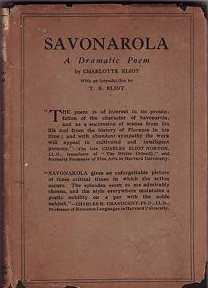
The cover of Stearns's 1926 dramatic poem, Savonarola

T. S. Eliot was born in St. Louis, Missouri in 1888, while the family resided at 2635 Locust Street. T. S. attended Smith Academy and then furthered his education at Harvard University in Cambridge, Massachusetts. When T. S. was at Harvard, Charlotte sent him a letter that stated:

"I hope in your literary work you will receive early the recognition I strove for and failed. I should so have loved a college course, but was obliged to teach before I was nineteen. I graduated with high rank, 'a young lady of unusual brilliancy as a scholar' my old yellow testimonial says, but when I was set to teaching young children, my Trigonometry and Astronomy counted for nought, and I made a dead failure."

== Career ==
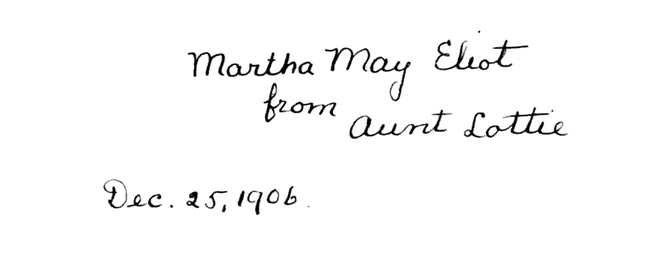
Likely Charlotte Stearns's handwriting, or her niece's, on the flyleaf of Stearns' biography of her father-in-law

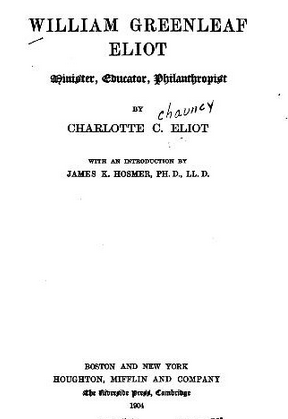
Title page of William Greenleaf Eliot: Minister, Educator, Philanthropist, written by Eliot, 1904

Eliot was a teacher for several years before she was a scholar and a writer of poems. Many of her poems appeared in religious periodicals. A collection of her poems, Easter Songs, was published in 1899. Her dramatic poem, Savonarola, was published in 1926 with the help of her son, T. S. Eliot. She was interested in the dramatization of events from medieval and Renaissance history that reflected the struggles of men who died for their faith.

After her years as a teacher, she participated in social reforms including providing a house of detention for juveniles.

Eliot wrote a biography of her father-in-law, William Greenleaf Eliot, a Unitarian minister and leading citizen of St. Louis titled, William Greenleaf Eliot: Minister, Educator, Philanthropist. It was published in 1904.

== Death ==
Eliot left St. Louis and moved to Cambridge, Massachusetts after the death of her husband in 1919. She died there in 1929 at eighty-six of a cerebral thrombosis. Her ashes were buried next to her husband's plot in Bellefontaine Cemetery in St. Louis. After her death, Henry Ware Eliot Jr. placed her poems and literary work in the Eliot collection at Harvard Library.
