= Cornelius von Berenberg-Gossler =

German banker

Baron Cornelius von Berenberg-Gossler (2 March 1874 – 29 September 1953) was a German banker, a member of the illustrious Berenberg-Gossler banking dynasty, and owner and head of Berenberg Bank from 1913. He withdrew from active management of the bank in 1932.

Born as Cornelius Gossler, he was the son of Johann Berenberg Gossler (who was later ennobled as Baron von Berenberg-Gossler) and the brother of Senator and Ambassador John von Berenberg-Gossler. Through his American-born grandmother he was a descendant of Samuel Eliot. Although he was the younger brother, the leadership of Berenberg Bank as well as the Baronial title passed to him, as his older brother John chose to become a politician against the wish of their father. He was married to Nadia von Oesterreich (1887–1962), a daughter of Constantin von Oesterreich, a member of a merchant and banking family in Hamburg originally from St. Petersburg in Russia. They were the parents of Baron Heinrich von Berenberg-Gossler.

Cornelius von Berenberg-Gossler was an avowed opponent of the Nazi regime and determinedly sought to help Jewish friends and associates keeping their assets under the pressure of Aryanization, petitioned for their release when arrested and eventually helped them to leave the country. In 1939, he secured the release of Fritz Warburg.

He was a member of the board of directors of Deutsche Warentreuhand, that had been founded in 1920 by Max Warburg and Paul von Mendelssohn-Bartholdy of Mendelssohn & Co. He was also Chairman of the Board of Directors of the Universitäts-Gesellschaft Hamburg.

== Literature ==
- Genealogisches Handbuch des Adels, Band 16, Freiherrliche Häuser B II, C. A. Starke Verlag, Limburg (Lahn) 1957

German nobility
Preceded by Johann von Berenberg-Gossler	Baron of Berenberg-Gossler; 1913–1953	Succeeded by Heinrich von Berenberg-Gossler
Business positions
Preceded by Johann von Berenberg-Gossler	Head of Berenberg Bank; 1913–1932	Succeeded by Heinrich von Berenberg-Gossler
