= First Unitarian Church of Portland =

Historic church in Portland, Oregon, U.S.

- U.S. National Register of Historic Places
- Portland Historic Landmark
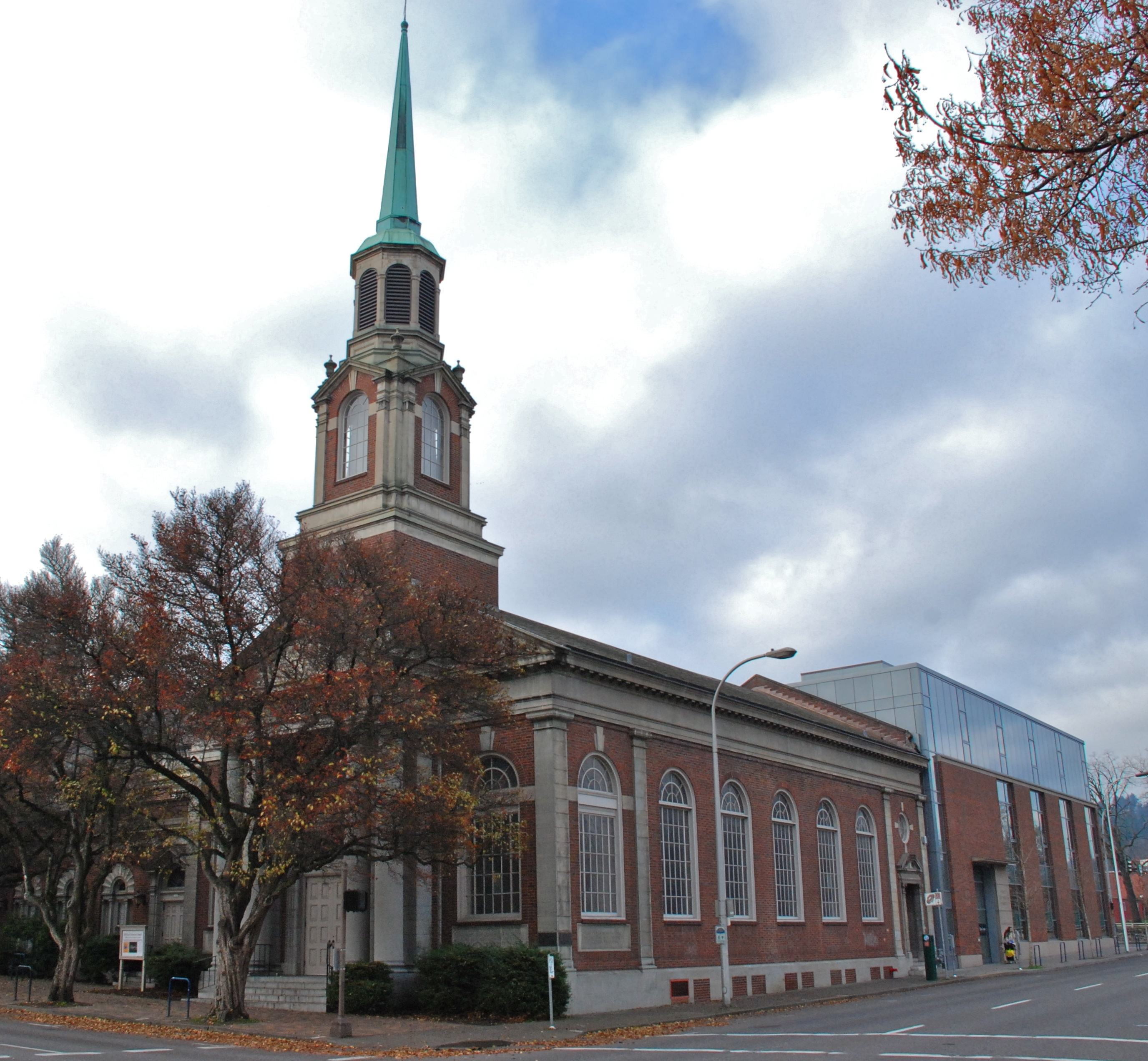
- The church's exterior in 2011

- Location within Portland, Oregon Location within Oregon Location within the United States
- Location: 1011 SW 12th Avenue; Portland, Oregon
- Coordinates: 45°31′07″N 122°41′08″W
- Built: 1924
- Architect: Jamieson K. Parker
- Architectural style: Colonial Revival, Georgian Revival
- NRHP reference No.: 78002315
- Added to NRHP: November 22, 1978

The First Unitarian Church of Portland is a church located in downtown Portland, Oregon, United States, listed on the National Register of Historic Places. It was constructed and opened in 1924.

== History ==
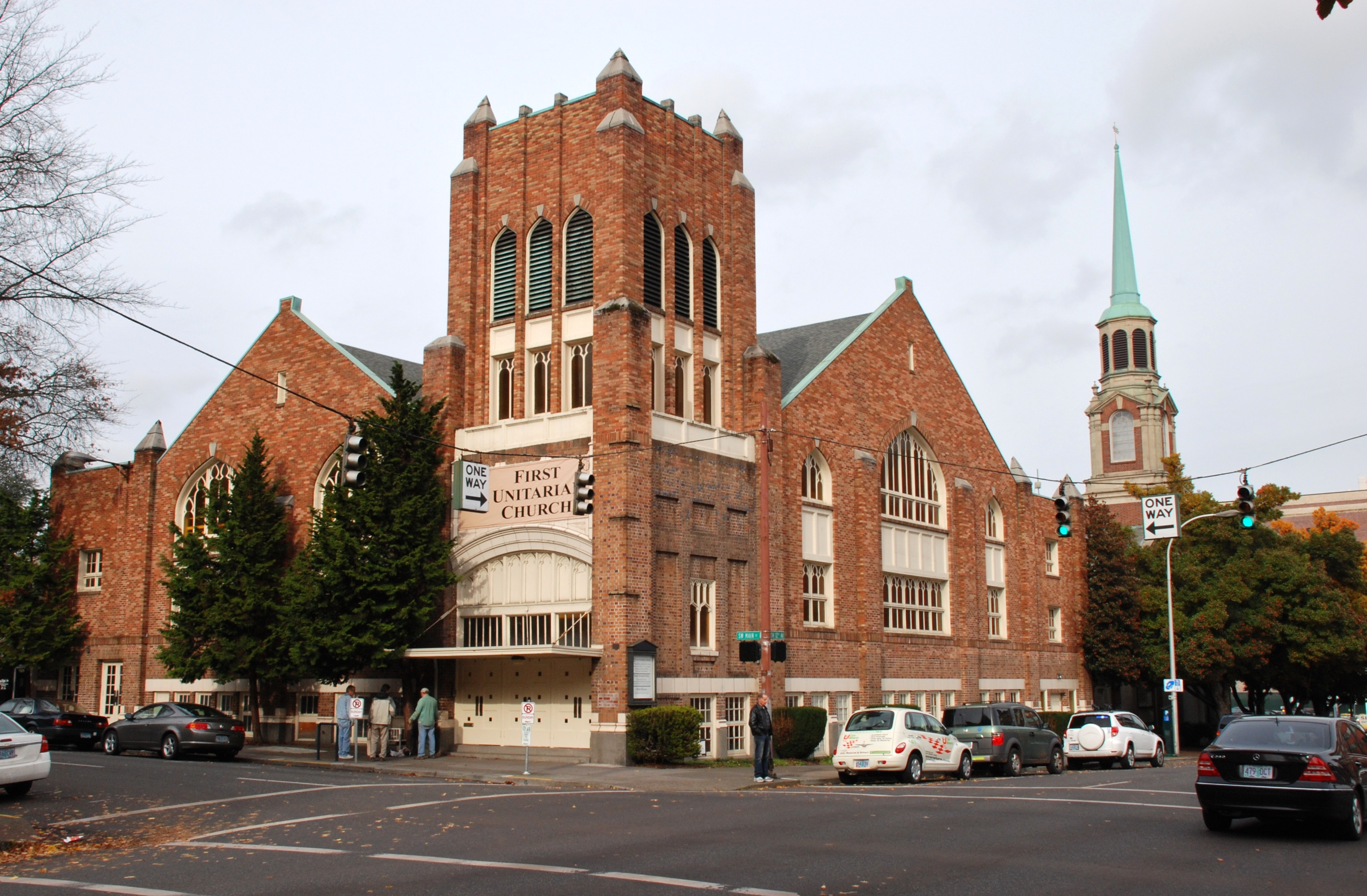
Not listed on the NRHP is the building now serving as the First Unitarian Church's main sanctuary, built in 1921 as the First Church of the Nazarene.

In 1979, the Unitarian church purchased a larger church located directly adjacent, the original First Church of the Nazarene of Portland, which had been built in 1921. The Nazarene church congregation was preparing for construction of a new, larger building in the Sylvan neighborhood, so decided to sell their original building.

The former Nazarene building (at 1211 S.W. Main Street), which adjoins the First Unitarian Church but with its entrance oriented to the corner of 12th and Main, has been regularly used for Sunday services by the Unitarian church since 1993 and is currently the church's primary sanctuary, but the 1921 building is not listed on the National Register of Historic Places. The NRHP-listed 1924 building is still owned and used by the First Unitarian Church of Portland, and church members refer to it as the Eliot Chapel after the first minister, Thomas Lamb Eliot. Eliot Chapel was designed by Jamieson K. Parker, while the former Nazarene building was designed by Raymond W. Hatch.

== See also ==
- Culture of Portland, Oregon
- National Register of Historic Places listings in Southwest Portland, Oregon
- Religion in Portland, Oregon
