= Robert Bernard Hall =

American politician

Robert B. Hall
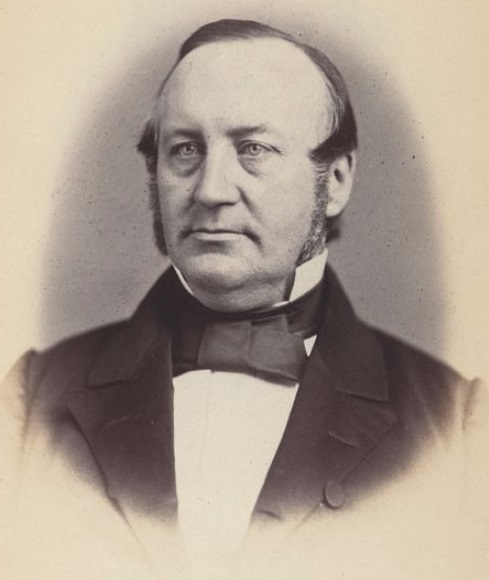

Member of the U.S. House of Representatives from Massachusetts's 1st district
- In office March 4, 1855 – March 3, 1859
- Preceded by: Thomas D. Eliot
- Succeeded by: Thomas D. Eliot

Member of the Massachusetts Senate
- In office 1855

Personal details
- Born: January 28, 1812 Boston, Massachusetts
- Died: April 15, 1868 (aged 56) Plymouth, Massachusetts
- Resting place: Oak Grove Cemetery
- Party: Republican/Whig

Robert Bernard Hall (January 28, 1812 – April 15, 1868) was a member of the United States House of Representatives from Massachusetts. He was born in Boston on January 28, 1812. He entered the Boston Latin School, studied theology at Yale Divinity School in New Haven, Connecticut where he graduated in 1835, and was ordained to the ministry, first as a Congregationalist and then as an Episcopalian. Hall was one of the twelve original members of Garrison’s Anti-Slavery Society.

He moved to Plymouth, Massachusetts and served in the Massachusetts State Senate. He was elected as the candidate of the American Party to the Thirty-fourth Congress and reelected as a Republican to the Thirty-fifth Congress (March 4, 1855 – March 3, 1859). Hall was a delegate to the National Union Convention in Philadelphia, and died in Plymouth on April 15, 1868. Interment was in Oak Grove Cemetery.

U.S. House of Representatives
Preceded by Thomas D. Eliot	Member of the U.S. House of Representatives from Massachusetts's 1st congressional district March 4, 1855 – March 3, 1859	Succeeded by Thomas D. Eliot
