= Andrew Eliot =

American minister

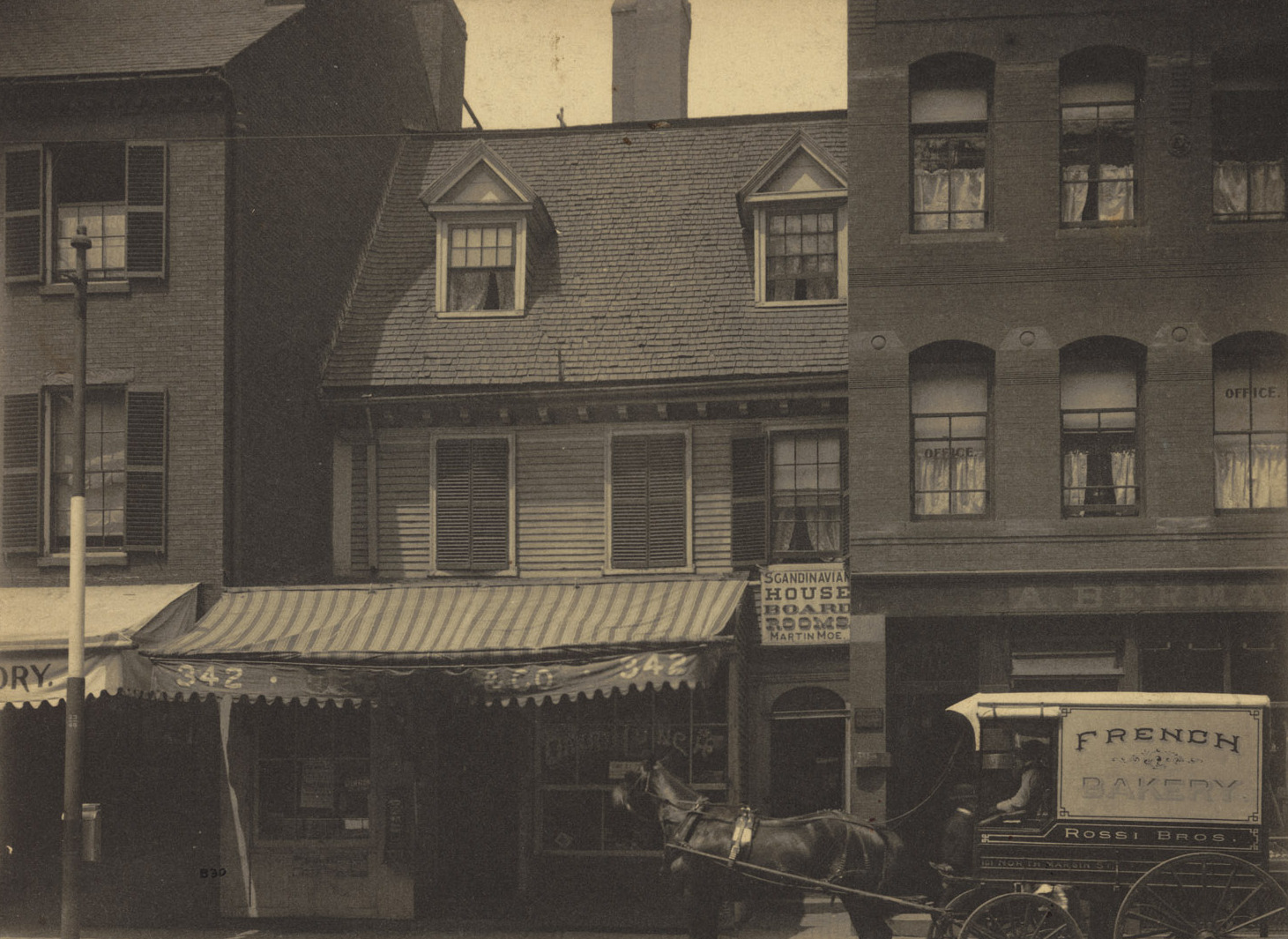
Built a year after the North Square was destroyed by fire in 1676, the Mather-Eliot House was the home of Rev Increase Mather, pastor of the Second Church in North Square, until his death in 1723. It was then occupied by the Reverend Andrew Eliot, then by his son John Eliot, ministers successively of the New North Church. Increase Mather was also the seventh President of Harvard College (1685-1701).

Andrew Eliot (1718 – 1778) was an American Congregational minister of the New North Church (now St. Stephen's in Boston's North End). He graduated from Harvard University in 1737 and received his masters in 1740. During the Siege of Boston in the American Revolutionary War, he was one of the few ministers to remain in Boston. In 1768, Eliot was elected to the American Philosophical Society.

Eliot's father, grandfather and great-grandfather were all named Andrew. He had five sons: Reverend Andrew Eliot was a minister in Fairfield, Connecticut, Josiah Eliot was said to have gone to Georgia, Samuel Eliot was a merchant and the grandfather of Reverend William Greenleaf Eliot, Reverend John Eliot succeeded his father as pastor of New North Church and was one of the co-founders of the Massachusetts Historical Society and Dr. Ephraim Eliot studied medicine at Harvard University but became an apothecary and the first president of the Massachusetts College of Pharmacy. Eliot had an extensive collection of New England silver coins.

== See also ==
- Eliot family (United States)

== Relevant literature ==
- Oakes, John S. 2025. Reluctant Revolutionary: The Life and Legacy of Pastor Andrew Eliot (1718–1778) of Boston. Wipf & Stock.
