= Margaret E. Martin =

American economist and statistician (1912-2012)

Margaret E. Martin (May 6, 1912 – May 16, 2012) was an economist and statistician at the U.S. Bureau of the Budget from 1942 to 1973. She was influential in the development of U.S. economic statistics and became president of the American Statistical Association.

== Early life ==
Margaret Elizabeth Martin was the first child born to Harry Martin, a teacher, and Frances Martin in New York in 1912. Her younger siblings were Jane, Eleanor and Robert. As an elementary student, her teachers included noted economist Clara Eliot.

== Education ==
In 1933, Martin received a bachelor's degree in economics from Barnard College, and went on to earn an MA and PhD in economics from Columbia University.

== Career ==
Martin worked for the Division of Statistical Standards of the Bureau of the Budget beginning in 1942. The Current Population Survey, which has been the primary source of labor statistics within the country, was developed by Martin and others. The survey is produced by the United States Census Bureau and the U.S. Bureau of Labor Statistics now.

From 1973 to 1978 Martin was the first executive director of the Committee on National Statistics (CNSTAT) created by the United States National Research Council.

== Recognition ==
She was elected a Fellow of the American Statistical Association in 1961 and became president in 1980. In 1989 the Association awarded her the Founders Award.

She was elected to the International Statistical Institute in 1973.

== Death ==
Martin died May 16, 2012, of pneumonia and congestive heart failure at Suburban Hospital in Bethesda, Maryland. One of her sisters was alive at the time of her death.

== Bibliography ==
- Miron L. Straf; Margaret E. Martin (1992). Principles and Practices for a Federal Statistical Agency. National Academies. ISBN 978-0-309-09599-0.
