= Hugh M. Raup =

Hugh Miller Raup (February 4, 1901 – August 10, 1995) was an American botanist, ecologist and geographer working on natural history and natural resource management in diverse regions—from tropical and temperate to arctic.

== Biography ==
He was born in Springfield, Ohio to Gustavas Philip and Fanny Mitchell Raup on February 4, 1901. The American philosopher, Dr. Robert Bruce Raup, (b. 1888) was his older brother.

He attended Wittenberg College, receiving an A.B. in 1923. Immediately following his graduation, Raup was appointed as an instructor in biology. He received his Ph.D. from the University of Pittsburgh in 1928, and was promoted to assistant professor at Wittenberg. Raup left Wittenberg College in 1932 to serve as a research assistant and associate at Harvard's Arnold Arboretum, a position he held from 1932 to 1938, then in the department of botany, where he was professor of botany and Bullard professor in forestry.

He served as director of the Harvard Forest from 1946 to 1967. After his retirement from Harvard in 1967, he spent three years as visiting professor of geography at Johns Hopkins University.

Raup spent several summers in the late 1960s in Mestersvig in North-East Greenland investigating the relationship between vegetation and environment in an arctic landscape.

He died on August 10, 1995, in Sister Bay, Wisconsin.

== Publications ==
- 1934: Phytogeographic Studies in the Peace and Upper Liard River Regions, Canada
- 1957: Vegetational adjustment to the instability of the site. Proc. and Papers of the Tech. Meeting, 6th Internat. Union for the Conserv. of Natural
- 1982: The Lake Athabasca Sand Dunes of Northern Saskatchewan and Alberta, Canada, with G. W. Argus

== See also ==
- Arthur Tansley
