= Henry Ware Eliot =

American industrialist and philanthropist

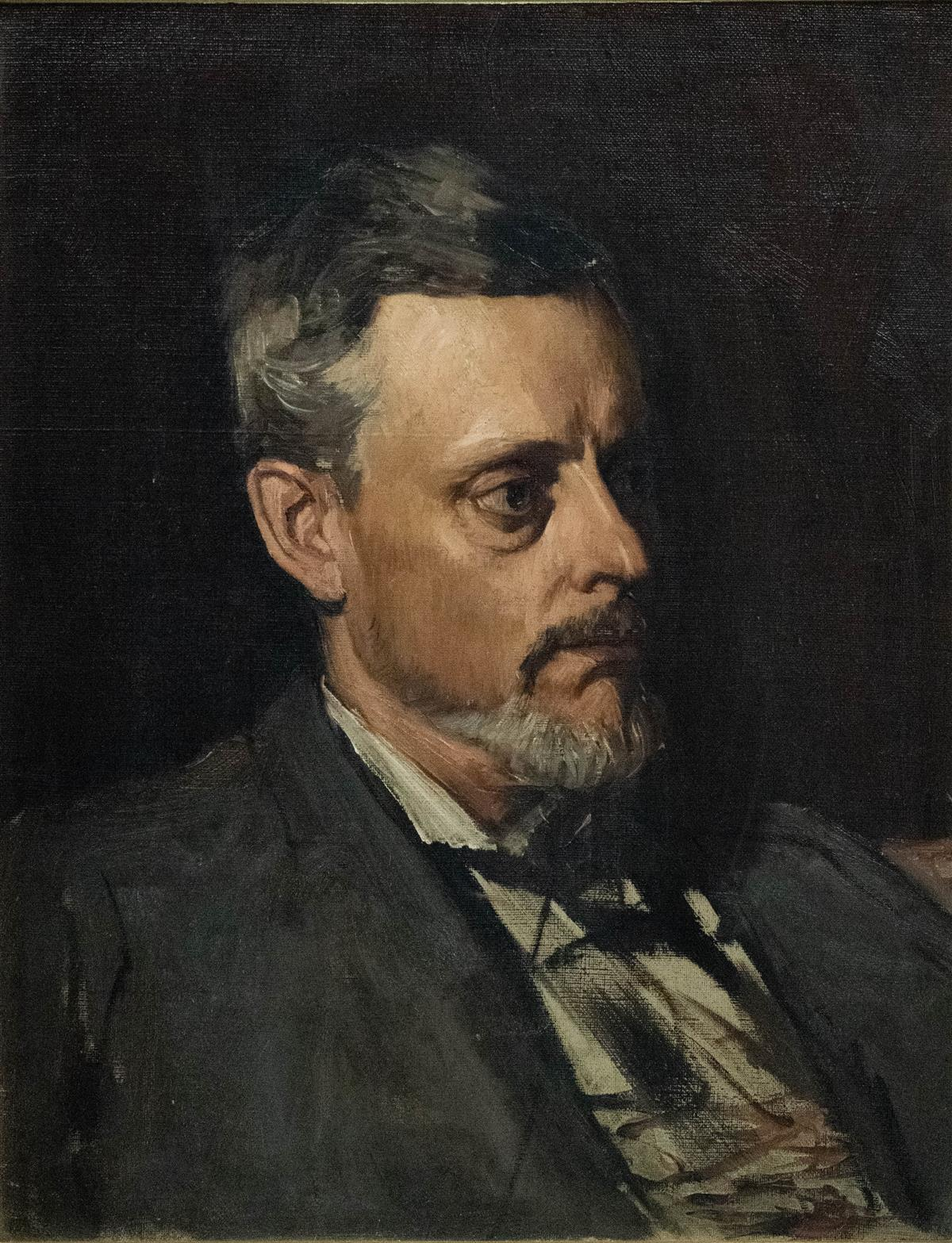
- Portrait of Henry Ware Eliot by Abbott Handerson Thayer
- Born: 25 November 1843
- Died: 7 January 1919 (aged 75)
- Occupations: industrialist, philanthropist
- Spouses: Charlotte Champe Stearns (m. 1868)
- Parents: William Greenleaf Eliot; Abigail Adams Cranch
- Relatives: Eliot family

Henry Ware Eliot (November 25, 1843 – January 7, 1919) was an American industrialist and philanthropist who lived in St. Louis, Missouri. He was the father of poet T. S. Eliot.

== Early life and education ==
He was the son of Abigail Adams (Cranch) and William Greenleaf Eliot, a prominent St. Louis Unitarian minister who was a co-founder of Washington University in St. Louis. Eliot graduated from Washington University, A.B. 1863. Henry Eliot remained a Unitarian all his life. Henry was named in honor of Henry Ware Jr., a prominent leader of Harvard Divinity School and mentor of Henry Eliot's father in seminary.

== Career ==
Eliot first worked at Reed and Green in the wholesale grocery business. Next, he became a partner in the firm of Eliot and Larkin as manufacturing chemists.

In 1874 Eliot became Secretary of the Hydraulic-Press Brick Company in St. Louis, later serving in all offices including President, until his retirement at age 70. He continued to aid the company with his judgment and experience.

== Public life ==
He served on the Board of Directors of Washington University, 1877–1919; as President of the Academy of Science, St. Louis, 1902; and Trustee of the Missouri Botanical Garden, 1902-1903.

In later life he compiled a record of the descendants of his ancestor William Greenleaf (1724–1803).

== Marriage and family life ==
On October 27, 1868, at Lexington, Massachusetts Eliot married Charlotte Champe Stearns. They were the parents of two sons and five daughters: Ada (Eliot) Sheffield; Margaret Dawes Eliot; Charlotte (Eliot) Smith; Marian Cushing Eliot; Henry Ware Eliot Jr.; Theodora Sterling Eliot and the poet Thomas Stearns Eliot.

Eliot died in St. Louis in 1919 and was buried at Bellefontaine Cemetery. A tombstone provides information about both him and his wife.
