= John Dudley Philbrick =

American educator (1818–1886)

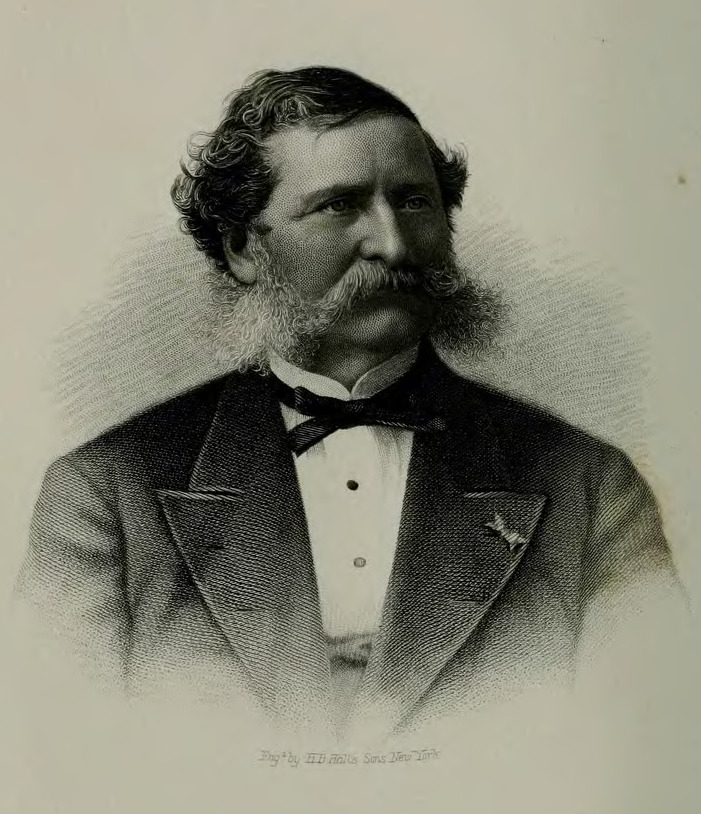
- Born: 27 May 1818
- Died: 2 February 1886
- Education: Dartmouth College

John Dudley Philbrick (May 28, 1818 – February 2, 1886) was an American educator. He graduated in 1842 from Dartmouth College, where he was one of the founders of the Kappa Kappa Kappa fraternity along with two of his closest companions, Brigadier General Harrison Carroll Hobart and Judge Stephen Gordon Nash. He was a schoolteacher for 11 years in Boston schools, including the Boston English High School, the Quincy School and Roxbury Latin. At the suggestion of Henry Barnard he was recruited in 1853 to become Barnard's successor as principal of the Connecticut State Normal School. This was followed by a term as Connecticut superintendent of common schools from 1855 to late 1856. In December 1856 he was elected superintendent of public schools in Boston, serving with one short interruption until March 1878.

The Quincy School in Boston, which he co-founded, was the first school in the United States with grades, as opposed to one room with all students. He was a frequent writer on educational topics and contributor to educational journals. He served as president of the National Educational Association and both the Connecticut and Massachusetts Teachers Associations, and was for ten years a member of the Massachusetts State Board of Education. His publications include City School Systems in the United States (Washington: Govt. Printing Office, 1885). A public elementary school in Boston's Roslindale neighborhood is named in his honor.

Educational offices
| Preceded by Henry Barnard | Connecticut Superintendent of Common Schools; 1855–1856 | Succeeded by David N. Camp |
| Preceded by Nathan Bishop | Superintendent of Boston Public Schools; 1856–1878 | Succeeded by Samuel Eliot |
