= Abigail Adams Eliot =

American educator

- Born: October 9, 1892; Dorchester, Boston, U.S.
- Died: October 29, 1992 (aged 100); Concord, Massachusetts, U.S.
- Education: Radcliffe College; Harvard Graduate School of Education
- Known for: Early childhood education
- Partner: Anna E. Holman

Abigail Adams Eliot (October 9, 1892 – October 29, 1992) was an American educator and a leading authority on early childhood education. She was a founding member of the National Association for the Education of Young Children, supervised the Federal Emergency Relief Administration's nursery school program in New England in the 1930s, and co-founded the Eliot Community Mental Health Center in Concord, Massachusetts. The Eliot-Pearson Department of Child Study at Tufts University is named for Eliot and her colleague, Elizabeth W. Pearson.

== Early life ==
Abigail Adams "Abby" Eliot was born in the Dorchester neighborhood of Boston on October 9, 1892, the youngest child of Reverend Christopher Rhodes Eliot and Mary Jackson (May) Eliot. The Eliots were a prominent Boston Brahmin family. Abby's father was a Unitarian minister and her grandfather, William G. Eliot, was the first chancellor of Washington University in St. Louis. Her sister, Martha May Eliot, became a nationally known public health specialist, and her brother, Frederick May Eliot, headed the Unitarian Association of America for many years. The poet, playwright, critic, and Nobel laureate T.S. Eliot was her first cousin.

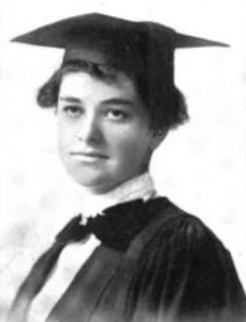
At Radcliffe in 1914

After serving at the First Parish Church of Dorchester on Meeting House Hill for 13 years, Reverend Eliot became the minister and social worker at the Bulfinch Place Church in the West End, and the family moved to 2 West Cedar Street on Beacon Hill. Eliot graduated from the Winsor School, a private preparatory school on Beacon Hill, in 1910. After receiving her A.B. degree from Radcliffe College in 1914, she spent five years doing social work for Associated Charities and the Children's Mission to Children. From 1919 to 1920 she studied at Oxford University, and briefly worked for the Massachusetts Minimum Wage Committee. The Woman's Education Association of Boston sent her to England for six months in 1921 to study the nursery school movement at the Rachel McMillan Nursery School and Training Centre in London, and to prepare herself to start a similar school in Boston.

== Career ==
In January 1922, with the sponsorship the Woman's Education Association, Eliot co-founded the Ruggles Street Nursery School in Roxbury with Boston philanthropist Elizabeth W. Pearson. In addition to teaching children, the school trained teachers in early childhood education. Eliot served as Director until 1952. She also continued her education, earning her Ed.M. from the Harvard Graduate School of Education in 1926 and her Ed.D. in 1930. Eliot became a leading proponent of early childhood education, teaching at the Ruggles School and at Wellesley College and giving frequent talks to parent and church groups. In 1923 she helped found the Cambridge Nursery School. She helped organize the National Association for Nursery Education, which became the National Association for the Education of Young Children, and served for a time as its secretary-treasurer.

During the Depression, the Roosevelt Administration's Federal Emergency Relief Administration organized "emergency nursery schools" for needy children. Eliot became a member of the National Advisory Committee for the program, and supervised its New England operations.

The Ruggles Street Nursery School eventually became the Nursery Training School of Boston and moved to 355 Marlboro Street. In 1951 it became the Eliot-Pearson Department of Child Study at Tufts University and moved to Medford, Massachusetts. The Eliot-Pearson Award, given biennially to honor outstanding contributions in the field of children's media, is known as the "Abby".

== Later years ==
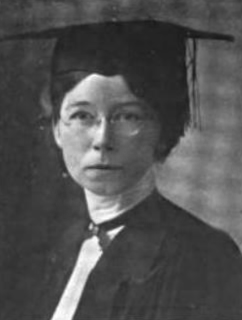
Anna E. Holman

After retiring in 1952, Eliot taught for two years at Pacific Oaks College in Pasadena, California. In 1954 she returned to Massachusetts and taught for several years at the Brooks School and Garland Junior College. She served on many boards and committees for child guidance and mental health and on the Radcliffe College Board of Trustees. She also continued to give lectures, and helped found the Walden Clinic, which became the Eliot Community Mental Health Center in Concord, Massachusetts.

Eliot's partner for more than 50 years was poet and teacher Anna E. Holman, who had been her classmate at Radcliffe. They shared the Grindall Reynolds House in Concord from 1954 until Holman's death in 1969. She died of a heart attack on October 29, 1992, aged 100, at the New England Deaconess Home in Concord.

== See also ==
- Lucy Miller Mitchell
