= Paul Donnelly Paganucci =

American businessman

- Born: April 18, 1931; Waterville, Maine, US
- Died: February 26, 2001 (aged 69); Hanover, New Hampshire, US
- Education: Dartmouth College, Tuck School of Business, Harvard Law School
- Occupations: Investment banker, educator, college financial administrator
- Board member of: W. R. Grace and Company, Colby College, Filene's Basement Corp., Ambase Corporation, State Mutual Securities, Inc., Sherman Fairchild Foundation, Ledyard National Bank, Urstadt Biddle Properties Inc., Grace Foundation, Inc.
- Spouse: Marilyn McLean
- Children: 2
- Honors: Tuck Overseers Medal (1992); Paul D. Paganucci Chair of Italian Language and Literature at Dartmouth (1994); Tuck Distinguished Alumni Award (1999)

Paul Donnelly Paganucci (April 18, 1931 – February 26, 2001) was a prominent American investment banker, university educator, college financial administrator and businessman.

== Early life and education ==
Paganucci was born in Waterville, Maine to Romeo J. and Martha (Donnelly) Paganucci. After completing Waterville High School in 1949, he went on to graduate summa cum laude from Dartmouth College (A.B., 1953), where he was elected to Phi Beta Kappa; he also received degrees from Dartmouth's Amos Tuck School of Business Administration (M.B.A., 1954), and Harvard Law School (J.D., 1957). At the college, Paganucci joined the fraternity Kappa Kappa Kappa where he served as president.

== Career ==
After service in the United States Army, Paganucci worked briefly for W. R. Grace and Company, where his close association with CEO J. Peter Grace would remain an important fixture for the balance of his career. In 1961, he founded an investment banking firm with classmates from Dartmouth; the firm was ultimately called Lombard, Vitalis, Paganucci and Nelson, Inc. (members, New York Stock Exchange), of which Paganucci was president, treasurer and a director.

In 1972, Paganucci left Wall Street to become associate dean and professor of business administration at the Tuck School of Business. He became chief financial officer and vice president and treasurer of Dartmouth in 1975, while continuing to teach at Dartmouth's Tuck School; he remained an officer of Dartmouth until 1986. During his tenure as CFO, Dartmouth's endowment tripled.

He returned to W. R. Grace and Company in 1986 and served as executive vice president, vice chairman and ultimately, chairman of the executive committee and director. Initially, three executives — Paganucci, J.P. Bolduc and Terrence D. Daniels — had been appointed vice chairmen by then 77-year-old CEO J. Peter Grace in a leadership competition. Bolduc ultimately won out and was designated as Grace's successor, Paganucci having already relinquished the race; Paganucci became chair of the executive committee. (Bolduc was later terminated after allegations that he had engaged in misconduct with five female employees.) Paganucci remained an officer of Grace until 1991.

In 1991, Paganucci helped found Ledyard National Bank (Hanover, New Hampshire), and from inception chaired its board of directors.

In 1992, Paganucci received the Tuck Overseers' Medal for service, and he was awarded Tuck's Distinguished Alumni Award in 1999. In 1993, Dartmouth established the Paul D. Paganucci Chair of Italian Language and Literature in his honor.

Paganucci participated in a management institute at Colby College in his hometown of Waterville, Maine in 1975 and was then asked to join its board of trustees; he remained on the board for 26 years, the last 20 as chairman of the board's investment committee. He is credited with helping to grow the school's endowment twelvefold during his term. In 1988, he established Colby's Paul and Marilyn Paganucci Scholarship Fund to help graduates of high schools in central Maine attend the school. He and his wife also endowed Colby's Paul D. and Marilyn Paganucci Chair in Italian Language and Literature in 2000, which brought about the return of Italian studies to Colby's curriculum.

Paganucci served as a director of numerous corporations, including Ambase Corporation, State Mutual Securities, Inc., Filene's Basement Corp., Urstadt Biddle Properties Inc., Grace Foundation, Inc. and Sherman Fairchild Foundation.
