= Edwin P. Seaver =

American educator (1838–1917)

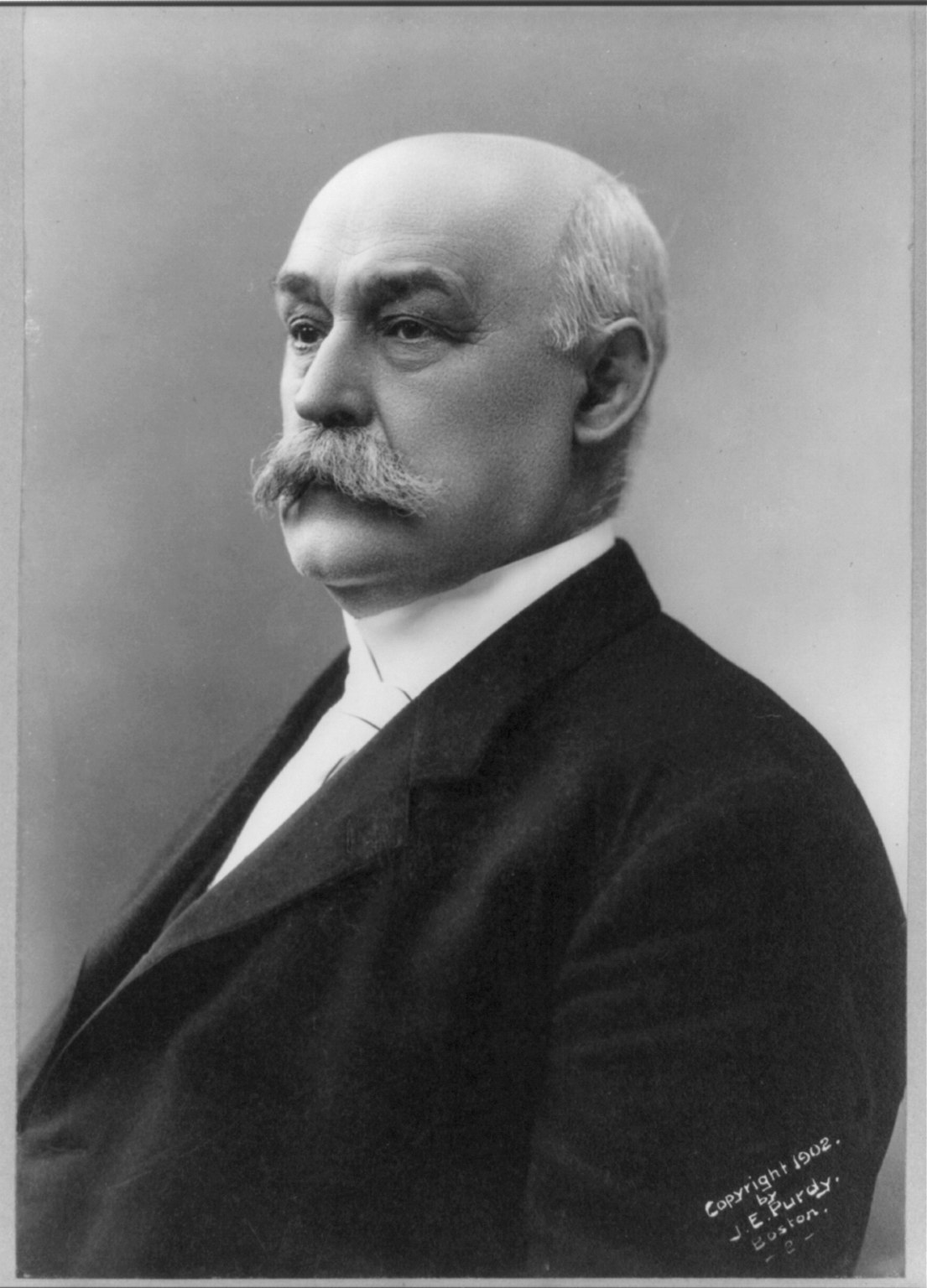
- Born: Edwin Pliny Seaver; February 24, 1838; Northborough, Massachusetts, U.S.
- Died: December 8, 1917 (aged 79); New Bedford, Massachusetts, U.S.
- Education: Bridgewater State Normal School
- Occupation: Educator
- Spouse: Margaret Wiley Cushing (m. 1872)

Edwin Pliny Seaver (February 24, 1838 – December 8, 1917) was an American educator who served as superintendent of Boston Public Schools from 1880 to 1904.

== Early life ==
Seaver was born on February 24, 1838, in Northborough, Massachusetts. After graduating from Bridgewater State Normal School he taught one semester in East Stoughton before accepting a position at the Friends Academy. From 1860 to 1861 he attended Phillips Exeter Academy to prepare for Harvard College.

== Career ==
After graduating in 1864, Seaver returned to the Friends Academy, but left after only a year to become a tutor in mathematics at Harvard. In 1869 he was promoted to assistant professor. While teaching at Harvard, Seaver was also a law student and graduated from Harvard Law School in 1868. From 1874 to 1880 he was the headmaster of The English High School. From 1879 to 1891 he was a member of the Harvard Board of Overseers.

On September 1, 1880, Samuel Eliot resigned as superintendent of Boston Public Schools. A nomination committee was formed and chose Seaver and Larkin Dutton as suitable candidates for the job. On November 9, 1880, the Boston School Committee voted 14 to 6 in favor of Seaver. While serving as superintendent, Seaver also chaired the committee on industrial education and, along with George Walton, wrote a series of arithmetic texts for use in public schools. Seaver was reelected superintendent with little opposition every two years until June 26, 1900, when he was unable to receive enough votes for reappointment. His opponents, however, were unable to elect a successor and he was reelected on August 15. In 1904, supervisor George H. Conley was elected over Seaver 13 to 10.

== Personal life ==
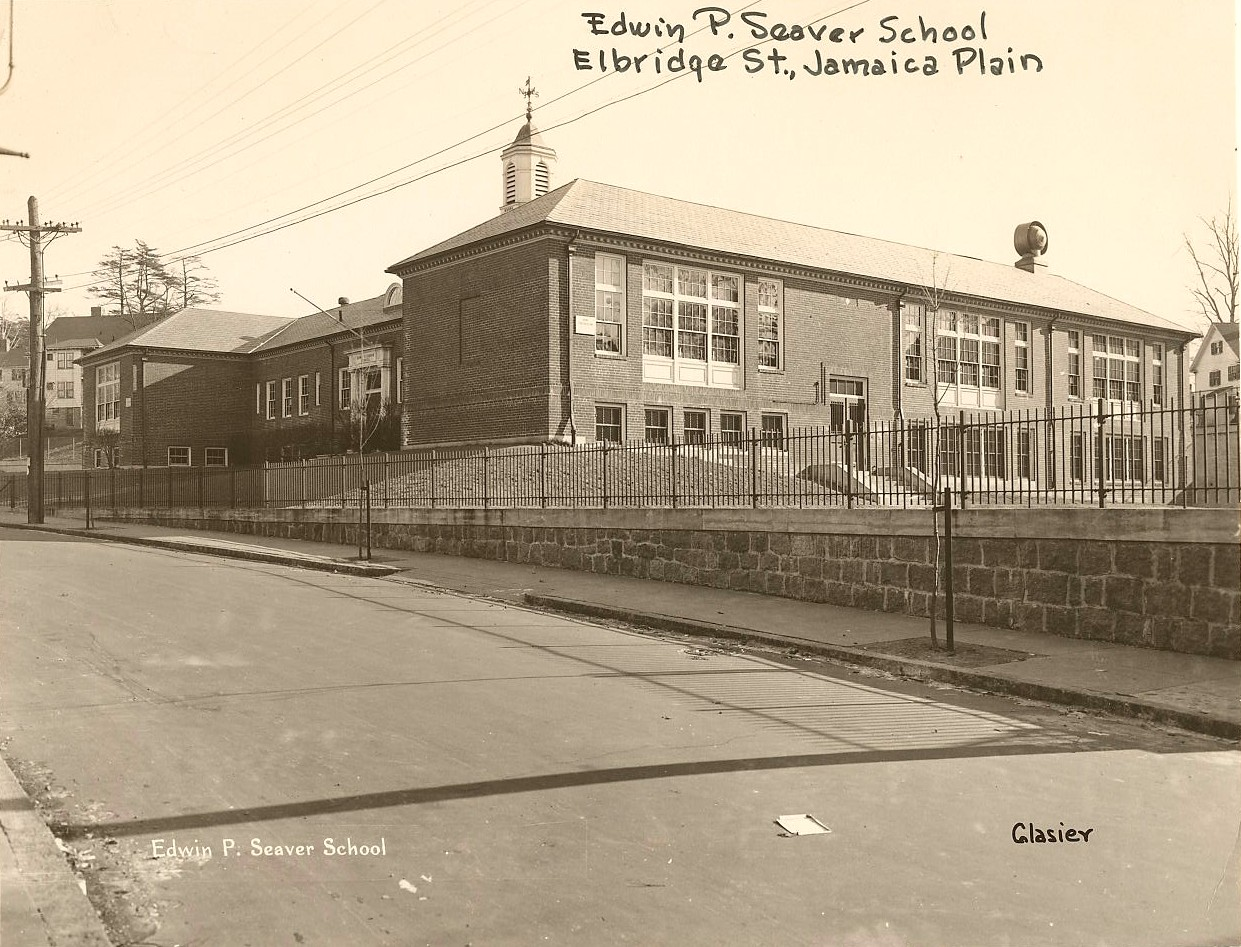
Edwin P. Seaver School

On September 10, 1872, he married Margaret Wiley Cushing of Cambridge, Massachusetts. They had seven children, one of whom, Edwin Jr., was a noted otorhinolaryngologist. In 1876 the Seavers moved from Cambridge to Roxbury. Two years later they moved to Waban, Massachusetts.

Due to his frugality and successful investments, Seaver was able to retire after leaving Boston Public Schools. He spent his later years in New Bedford, Massachusetts, where he died on December 8, 1917. In 1923, a school in Forest Hills was named after Seaver.

Educational offices
Preceded by Samuel Eliot	Superintendent of Boston Public Schools; 1880–1904	Succeeded by George H. Conley
