= Baron of Berenberg-Gossler =

Title in the German nobility

- Peerage: Germany
- First holder: Johann von Berenberg-Gossler
- Present holder: Cornelius von Berenberg-Gossler
- Seat: Gut Niendorf

Baron of Berenberg-Gossler (German: Freiherr von Berenberg-Gossler) is a title in the German nobility, specifically the nobility of the Kingdom of Prussia, created in 1910 for banker Johann von Berenberg-Gossler of the Hamburg Hanseatic Berenberg-Gossler family. The title is held by one person at a time and is tied to an entailed estate (Fideikommiss), Gut Niendorf. For this reason, it is not always inherited by the eldest son. The title is currently (since 1997) held by humanitarian Cornelius von Berenberg-Gossler. The first three title holders were all heads of Berenberg Bank.

== Barons of Berenberg-Gossler ==
- Johann von Berenberg-Gossler 1910–1913
- Cornelius von Berenberg-Gossler 1913–1953
- Heinrich von Berenberg-Gossler 1953–1997
- Cornelius von Berenberg-Gossler 1997–
