= William Havard Eliot =

American architect

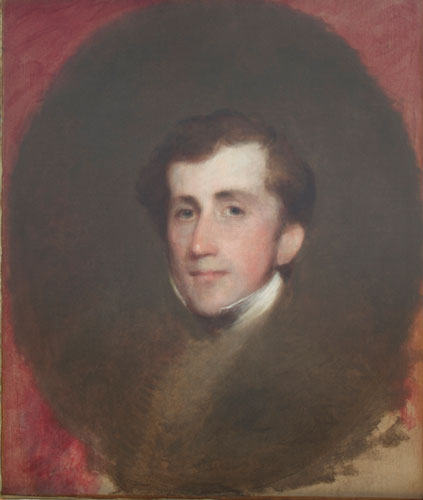
- portrait by Gilbert Stuart
- Born: 1796
- Died: 1831 (aged 34–35)

William Havard Eliot (1796–1831) was an architect and builder of the Tremont House in Boston, Massachusetts. He participated in the musical life of Boston. Eliot's father was banker Samuel Eliot.

== Personal life and death ==
He was married to Margaret Boies Eliot (née Bradford), a daughter of Alden Bradford. Their son was Samuel Eliot. Variants of Eliot's names include Hayward, Harvard, Havard, Howard, and Elliott.

In 1831, while campaigning for mayor of Boston, Eliot unexpectedly died. He was buried at Mount Auburn Cemetery.
