= Heinrich von Berenberg-Gossler =

German banker

Heinrich Freiherr von Berenberg-Gossler (1907–1997) was a German banker, a member of the illustrious Berenberg-Gossler banking dynasty, and owner and head of Berenberg Bank.

He was the son of Baron Cornelius von Berenberg-Gossler and Nadia, née Oesterreich (1887–1962), and the nephew of Senator and Ambassador John von Berenberg-Gossler.

In the 1930s, he worked for the Bank of London and South America in Buenos Aires. He became a partner of Berenberg Bank in 1935 and later Chairman. He was also consul general of Monaco.

== Literature ==
- Genealogisches Handbuch des Adels, Band 16, Freiherrliche Häuser B II, C. A. Starke Verlag, Limburg (Lahn) 1957

German nobility
Preceded by Cornelius von Berenberg-Gossler	Baron of Berenberg-Gossler; 1953–1997	Succeeded by Cornelius von Berenberg-Gossler
Business positions
Preceded by	Head of Berenberg Bank	Succeeded by
