= Michael Fisch =

American private equity investor

- Born: Montreal, Quebec, Canada
- Education: Dartmouth College (BA), Stanford University Graduate School of Business (MBA)
- Occupation: Investor
- Title: Founder and CEO, American Securities
- Website: michaelgfisch.com

Michael Fisch is an American businessman. He is the founder and CEO of American Securities, a New York-based private equity firm.

== Education ==
Fisch earned a bachelor’s degree from Dartmouth College in economics and policy studies. He then earned a master’s degree in business administration from Stanford Graduate School of Business. Since 2006, Fisch has also been a guest lecturer at Stanford.

== Career ==
In 1993, Fisch became a financial advisor for the family office of William Rosenwald, son of Sears, Roebuck and Company president Julius Rosenwald. He partnered with Charles Klein and founded American Securities in 1994. Today, the firm manages a mutlibillion-dollar private equity fund.

Fisch previously worked at Goldman Sachs in mergers and acquisitions and as a consultant at the Paris office of Bain & Company. He was also a partner in two private equity funds.

== Board memberships ==
Fisch is the director of the 1162 Foundation and serves on the board of directors at the Atlantic Council, where he is also a member of the executive committee. He is the chairman of the Atlantic Council's Freedom and Prosperity Center Advisory Council and has held several leadership roles with Human Rights Watch. Previously, he has held board advisory roles at the Icahn School of Medicine at Mount Sinai and Baylor College of Medicine. He is also a member of the board of trustees at Northwell Health and a trustee and past chair of the board of trustees at Princeton Theological Seminary. Fisch is also a member of the President’s Leadership Council at Dartmouth College.
