= Mary Mitchell Birchall =

First woman in New England to earn a bachelor's degree (1840-1898)

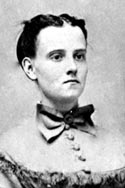
- Mitchell, ca. 1869
- Born: Mary Wheelwright Mitchell; 1840; Dover, Maine, U.S.
- Died: 1898 (aged 57–58)
- Resting place: McAllister Cemetery
- Occupation: Academic
- Spouse: Frank Birchall
- Children: 2

Mary Mitchell Birchall (1840-1898), born Mary Wheelwright Mitchell, was the first woman in New England to earn a bachelor's degree when she graduated from Bates College in 1869. She later was a professor at Vassar College and founded a girls' school in Boston.

Mitchell was born in 1840 in Dover, Maine, to John and Charlotte (Littlefield) Mitchell. She graduated from Bates College in 1869 while working in a local textile mill to support herself, and she reportedly turned down a scholarship. After graduation, Mitchell taught high school in Worcester, Massachusetts, and Miss Anna Brackett's School in New York, before becoming a professor at Vassar College in 1876. In 1891 she founded a girls' school in West Chester Park in Boston, which she ran until 1897. Mitchell also taught school in Laconia, New Hampshire.

She married Frank Birchall and had two children. She died in 1898 in the town of her birth and was buried in the McAllister Cemetery.
