= Joan R. Rosenblatt =

American statistician (1926-2018)

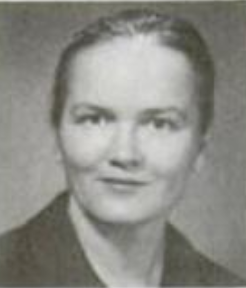
- Joan R. Rosenblatt, from a 1971 issue of Civil Service Journal
- Born: Joan Eliot Raup; April 15, 1926
- Died: December 5, 2018 (aged 92)
- Occupations: Mathematician; statistician

Joan Raup Rosenblatt (April 15, 1926 – December 5, 2018) was an American statistician who became Director of the Computing and Applied Mathematics Laboratory of the National Institute of Standards and Technology. She was president of the Caucus for Women in Statistics in 1976.

== Early life and education ==
Joan Eliot Raup was born in 1926, the daughter of two professors: Robert Bruce Raup, an educational psychologist at Teachers College, Columbia University, and Clara Eliot, an economist at Barnard College. At her birth, her mother became the first woman at Barnard to obtain a maternity leave. Raup chose statistics over mathematics, another possibility for her, because of its greater real-world applicability. She lived at home while attending Barnard College, and graduated in 1946.

She began graduate study in mathematical statistics at the University of North Carolina in 1948. In 1950 she married another mathematical statistician and federal employee, David Rosenblatt; they had no children. She completed her Ph.D. in 1956; her dissertation, supervised by Wassily Hoeffding, was On a Class of Non-Parametric Tests.

== Career ==
Raup worked as an intern at the National Institute of Public Affairs from 1946 to 1947, and as a statistical analyst at the Bureau of the Budget from 1947 to 1948.

On completing her Ph.D. in 1956, Rosenblatt was hired by Churchill Eisenhart, director of statistics at the National Bureau of Standards (the predecessor institution to the National Institute of Standards and Technology). She became assistant chief of statistical engineering there in 1963, chief in 1969, deputy director of applied mathematics in 1978, deputy director of computing and applied mathematics in 1988, and director in 1993. She retired in 1995.

== Recognition ==
In 1967, the year after her husband, Rosenblatt was elected as a Fellow of the American Statistical Association. She is also a Fellow of the Institute of Mathematical Statistics and, since 1987, of the American Association for the Advancement of Science.

She won the Federal Women's Award, an honor limited to five women per year, in 1971. In 1976 she won the Department of Commerce Gold Medal. She was given the Presidential Meritorious Executive Rank Award in 1982. In 1991 Rosenblatt was awarded the American Statistical Association's Founders Award.
