= Samuel A. Eliot (minister) =

American Unitarian minister (1862–1950)

Samuel Atkins Eliot
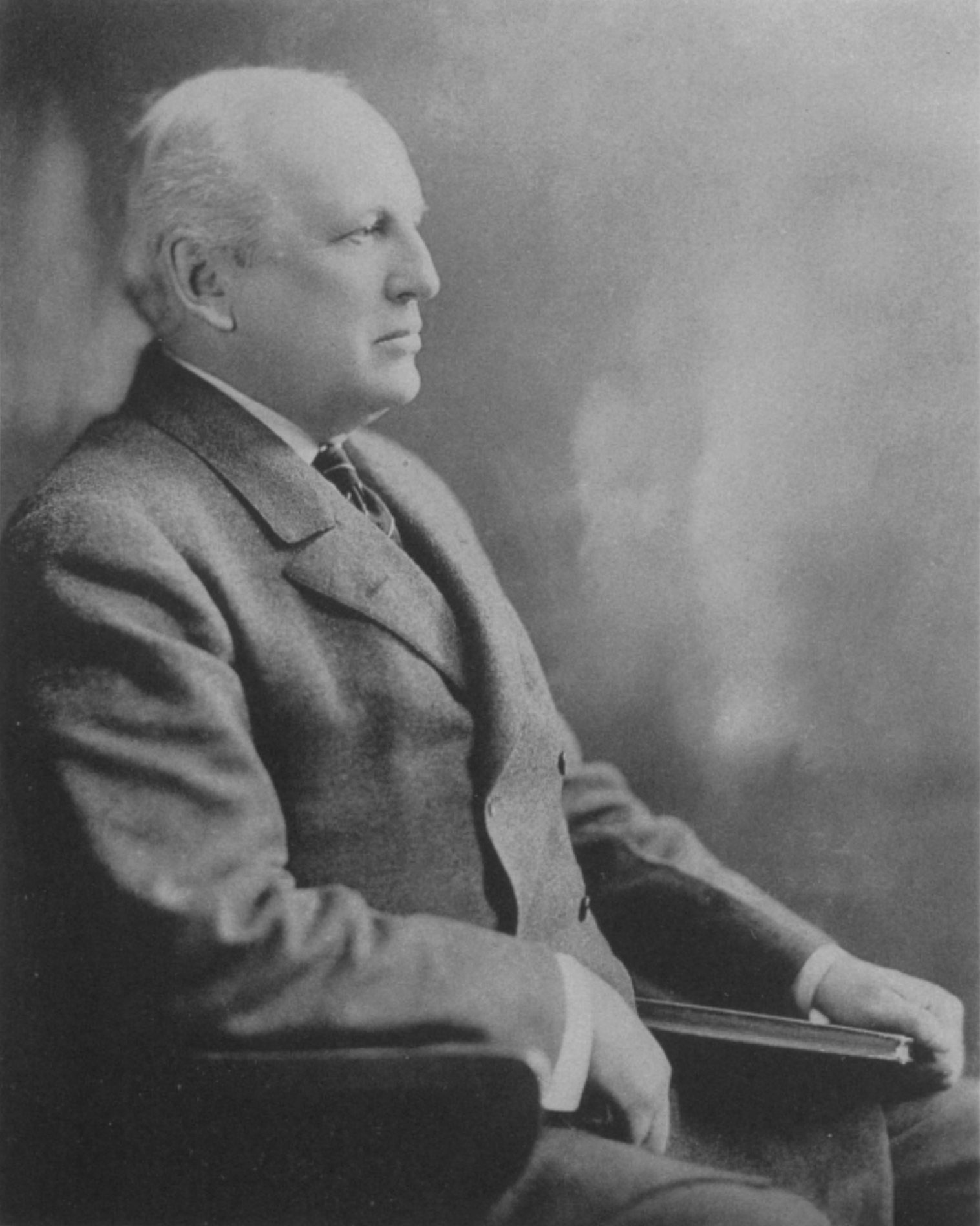
- Born: August 24, 1862; Cambridge, Massachusetts, US
- Died: October 15, 1950 (aged 88)
- Burial place: Mount Auburn Cemetery
- Education: Harvard University
- Spouse: Frances Hopkinson
- Children: Samuel Atkins Eliot Jr.; Charles William Eliot II
- Family: Eliot family

Samuel Atkins Eliot II (August 24, 1862 – October 15, 1950) was an American Unitarian minister. In 1898 the American Unitarian Association elected him secretary (a position effectively the chief executive officer) but in 1900 the position was redesignated as president and Eliot served in that office from inception to 1927, significantly expanding the association's activities and consolidating denominational power in its administration.

A member of the wealthy Eliot family, he was the son of Harvard President Charles W. Eliot and grandson of Boston politician Samuel Atkins Eliot. His fourth cousin, Frederick May Eliot, also served as President of the American Unitarian Association (1937–1958).

== Biography ==
=== Early life and education ===
Samuel Atkins Eliot was born in Cambridge, Massachusetts in 1862. His father, Charles W. Eliot, a chemist, became President of Harvard University when his son was four. His mother, Ellen Derby Peabody, daughter of Unitarian minister Ephraim Peabody, died the same year. Samuel graduated from Harvard College in 1884. He enrolled at Harvard Divinity School the following year, and after briefly serving as a missionary in Seattle, Washington, graduated in 1889. He held pastorates at Unity Church in Denver, Colorado (1889–92) and the Church of the Saviour in Brooklyn, New York (1892–98).

=== AUA Presidency ===
Eliot left congregational ministry to serve as Secretary of the American Unitarian Association (AUA) in 1898. At Eliot's urging, his position was re-titled President in 1900, a title which he retained until 1927 and transformed from a presiding to an executive office. Eliot's efforts to consolidate the National Council of Unitarian Churches under the American Unitarian Association established the denomination's modern associational governance. Where the pre-Eliot AUA had been an organization for individual membership, the merger created a structure of congregational membership and governance, an early incarnation of the Unitarian Universalist Association's General Assembly. Eliot also attracted wealth Unitarians to serve on the AUA's board, who presided over a major expansion of the AUA's operations into public advocacy, Sunday School curriculum, and ministerial credentialing.

Eliot was sympathetic to mid-20th century social reforms and established the first Department of Social Justice with the AUA. Responding to declining wealth in American central cities in the early twentieth century, Eliot encouraged the growth of suburban Unitarian churches. He was also active in shaping the political commitments and demographics of Unitarian clergy by using his office to de-fellowship ministers who objected to American involvement in World War I, discouraging women from seeking Unitarian ordination, and excluding women ministers from associational leadership.

While commemorating the American Unitarian Association's centennial in 1925, one of Eliot's final acts as President was to move the association to a new headquarters on Beacon Street. The new building, completed in 1927, retained the AUA's historic address (25 Beacon Street), but moved the Association from the east side of Massachusetts State House to its west side. In the following decades, the denomination purchased several more properties on Beacon Hill. The Unitarian Universalist Association, successor to the AUA after its 1961 merger with the Universalist Church of America, occupied the building until 2014, when it moved to Boston's Seaport District.

During and after his tenure as American Unitarian Association president, Eliot wrote and edited books on Unitarian and Massachusetts history, including two large biographical dictionaries, the Biographical History of Massachusetts (1906) and Heralds of a Liberal Faith (1910). The latter volume constituted his efforts to catalog Unitarian history and articulate Unitarianism as a discrete American tradition. Eliot also chaired an editorial committee and edited several volumes for the Centennial Edition of the works of Theodore Parker and completed a A History of Cambridge, Massachusetts, 1630-1913 in 1913.

=== Later life ===
After twenty-nine years at the helm of the American Unitarian Association, Eliot retired to become senior minister of the Arlington Street Church, the largest Unitarian congregation in Boston, where he remained until 1935. Eliot died on October 15, 1950, and was buried at Mount Auburn Cemetery.

== Bibliography ==
=== Authored ===
- Phillips Brooks and the Unity of the Spirit (1903)
- A History of Cambridge, Massachusetts, 1630-1913 (1913)
- Society for Propagating the Gospel among the Indians and Others in North America [Founded 1787]: an Historical Sketch (1942)
- Some Musical Memories of Cambridge (1949)

=== Edited volumes ===
- Biographical History of Massachusetts: Biographies and Autobiographies of the Leading Men in the State (Ed. Samuel Atkins Eliot) (1906)
- Heralds of a Liberal Faith (4 vol.)

Vol. 1: The Prophets (1910)
Vol. 2: The Pioneers (1910)
Vol. 3: The Preachers (1910)
Vol. 4: The Pilots (1952)

=== Critical editions ===
- Street, George E. Mount Desert: A History (1905)
- Centennial Edition of the Works of Theodore Parker

Parker, Theodore. Social Classes in a Republic (1907)
——. Historic Americans (1908)
——. Sermons of Religion (1908)

== See also ==
- Samuel Atkins Eliot Jr.
- Samuel Atkins Eliot (politician) (1798–1862) - Member of the United States House of Representatives from Massachusetts
- Thomas Dawes Eliot (1808–1870) - Member of the United States House of Representatives from Massachusetts
