= Robert Bruce Raup =

American philosopher

R. Bruce Raup.

Robert Bruce Raup (March 21, 1888 – April 13, 1976), was a Professor in the Philosophy of Education, Teachers College, Columbia University. He was a well-known writer in the 1930s, whose writings were influenced by his own teacher and mentor, the American philosopher John Dewey. Like his mentor, Professor Raup is often associated with the pedagogical concept of promoting practical (i.e. pragmatic) judgment as something appropriate and necessary within the context of a modern democratic society. He was best known for his criticism of the American public education system, which he claimed was inadequate and ineffective in its methods.

== Life ==
Raup was born in Clark County, Ohio to Gustavas Philip and Fanny Mitchell Raup on March 21, 1888. As a young man he attended public school first in Lagonda and later in Springfield, Ohio. He earned a A.B. degree at from Wittenberg College in 1909. After earning a B.D. degree from McCormick Theological Seminary in 1914, he served as minister of the American Presbyterian Church in Havana, Cuba from 1914 to 1915. From 1916 to 1918, Raup was an instructor in ethics and a college professor at Bellevue College in Nebraska. During World War I, he served as a military chaplain in the U.S. Army. From 1919 to 1921, he was an assistant professor of psychology at Blackburn College in Carlinville, Illinois. In 1921, he entered graduate studies at Teachers College, Columbia University where he was a student of John Dewey. It was there he met and married Clara Eliot on August 23, 1924. Raup earned a Ph.D. from Teachers College in 1926, and remained there until his retirement in 1953.

Raup was actively involved in many professional associations, including: the American Philosophical Association, the National Education Association, the National Society of College Teachers of Education, and the Progressive Education Association. He was President of the Philosophy of Education Society in 1941. He also served on the Federal Council of Churches in America's Committee on Education and Research.

Raup was instrumental in organizing and establishing several of the foundation courses in the Teachers College curriculum, including: Character and Moral Judgment in Education, Education in American Culture, and Education as Personal Development.

For his contribution to American educational theory, Raup received the Nicholas Murray Butler Medal in Silver from Columbia University.

Robert and Clara Raup had four children: Joan Eliot Raup (b. 1926), Ruth Mitchell Raup (b. 1927), Robert Bruce Raup, Jr. (b. 1929), and Charlotte Cranch Raup (b. 1933). Joan became a noted statistician, and Charlotte married Columbia University historian Lawrence A. Cremin.

Raup lived most of his years at Teachers College at his nearby country residence in Kent Cliffs, New York. After he retired in 1953, he moved to Palo Alto, California. He died in Palo Alto on April 13, 1976. He was, at that time, 88 years old.

The botanist, ecologist, and geographer, Hugh M. Raup (1901–1995) was his younger brother.

== Bibliography ==
- Complacency: The Foundation of Human Behavior (1925)
- Toward a New Education (1930)
- Problems in Philosophy of Education (1932)
- Education and Organized Interests in America (1936)
- The Discipline of Practical Judgment (1943)
- Method in Judgments of Practice, The Journal of Philosophy, Volume XLVI, No. 26 (1949)
- The Improvement of Practical Intelligence: The Central Task of Education (1950).

== See also ==
- Education reform
- American philosophy
- List of American philosophers
