= Thomas D. Eliot =

American politician

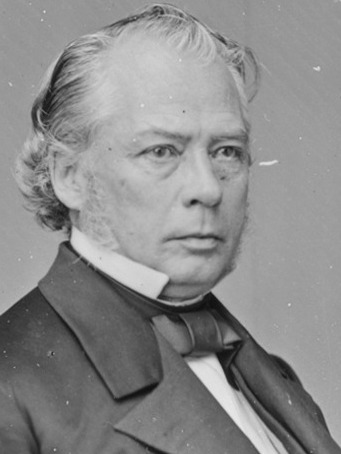

Member of the U.S. House of Representatives from Massachusetts's 1st district
- In office March 4, 1859 – March 3, 1869
- Preceded by: Robert Bernard Hall
- Succeeded by: James Buffington
- In office April 17, 1854 – March 3, 1855
- Preceded by: Zeno Scudder
- Succeeded by: Robert Bernard Hall

Member of the Massachusetts House of Representatives, and served in the Massachusetts State Senate
- In office 1839

Member of the Massachusetts State Senate
- In office 1846

Personal details
- Born: Thomas Dawes Eliot; March 20, 1808 Boston, Massachusetts, US
- Died: June 14, 1870 (aged 62) New Bedford, Massachusetts, US
- Party: Republican/Whig
- Spouse: Frances L. Brock
- Children: Caroline Dawes Eliot, Ida Eliot

Thomas Dawes Eliot (March 20, 1808 – June 14, 1870) was an American politician who was a member of the United States House of Representatives from Massachusetts. He was a member of the prominent Eliot family.

== Life and career ==
Eliot was born on March 20, 1808, in Boston, the son of Margaret Greenleaf (Dawes) and William Greenleaf Eliot. He was named after his grandfather Justice Thomas Dawes of the Massachusetts Supreme Judicial Court.

Eliot attended the public schools of Washington, D.C., and graduated from Columbian College in the District of Columbia, (now George Washington University in 1825. He was admitted to the bar and commenced practice in New Bedford, Massachusetts.

In 1834 Eliot married Frances L. Brock of Nantucket.

Eliot served as a member of the Massachusetts House of Representatives, and served in the Massachusetts State Senate. He was elected as a Whig to the Thirty-third Congress to fill the vacancy caused by the resignation of Zeno Scudder and served from April 17, 1854, to March 3, 1855. He declined to be a candidate for renomination. Eliot was a delegate to the Free Soil Convention in Worcester in 1855.

He declined to be a candidate for nomination by the Republican for Attorney General of Massachusetts in 1857. He was elected as a Republican to the Thirty-sixth and to the four succeeding Congresses (March 4, 1859 – March 3, 1869). Eliot served as Chairman of the Committee Freedmen's Affairs (Thirty-ninth and Fortieth Congresses), and the Committee on Commerce (Fortieth Congress). He declined to be a candidate for renomination in 1868. He resumed the practice of law and died on June 14, 1870. His interment was in Oak Grove Cemetery.

Eliot's daughter Ida M. Eliot was a notable educator and writer. Thomas Eliot's younger brother was philanthropist and Unitarian minister, William Greenleaf Eliot. His granddaughter Julia Meriam Stetson married with Dr. Leroy Milton Yale Jr., of the Yale family.

U.S. House of Representatives
Preceded by Zeno Scudder	Member of the U.S. House of Representatives from Massachusetts's 1st congressional district April 17, 1854 – March 3, 1855	Succeeded by Robert B. Hall
Preceded by Robert B. Hall	Member of the U.S. House of Representatives from Massachusetts's 1st congressional district March 4, 1859 – March 3, 1869	Succeeded by James Buffington
