= John von Berenberg-Gossler =

German banker and politician (1866–1943)

John von Berenberg-Gossler (22 October 1866 in Hamburg – 14 July 1943) was a Hamburg banker, politician and grand burgher.

== Career ==
He was elected Senator in Hamburg in 1908 and served as German Ambassador to Italy 1920–21. He was a member of the Berenberg-Gossler banking dynasty and the son of Baron Johann von Berenberg-Gossler (1839–1913), owner of Berenberg Bank, who was ennobled in Prussia in 1888 and conferred Baronial rank in 1910. His father had destined him to succeed him as head of the bank, and his election as Senator took place against the will of his father. He was forced to sell his share of the bank, and his brother Cornelius Freiherr von Berenberg-Gossler succeeded their father as head of the bank. He was head of the bank Hamburger Bank von 1861 (now Hamburger Volksbank) from 1923 to 1925.

== Literature ==
- Georg Wenzel (Hrsg.): Deutscher Wirtschaftsführer. Lebensgänge deutscher Wirtschaftspersönlichkeiten. Ein Nachschlagebuch über 13000 Wirtschaftspersönlichkeiten unserer Zeit. Hanseatische Verlags-Anstalt, Hamburg u. a. 1929.
- Maria Keipert (Red.): Biographisches Handbuch des deutschen Auswärtigen Dienstes 1871–1945. Herausgegeben vom Auswärtigen Amt, Historischer Dienst. Band 2: Gerhard Keiper, Martin Kröger: G–K. Schöningh, Paderborn u. a. 2005, ISBN 3-506-71841-X, S. 115.
