= Thomas Lamb Eliot =

American clergyman (1841–1936)

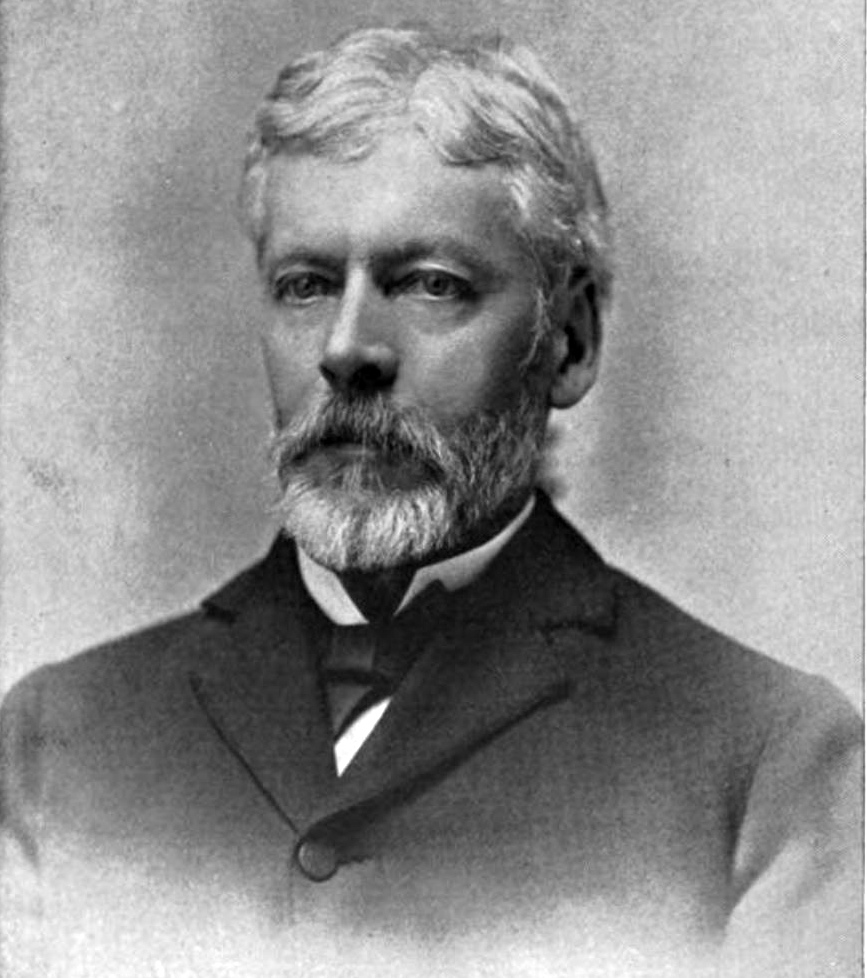
- Born: October 13, 1841; St. Louis, Missouri
- Died: April 28, 1936 (aged 94); Portland, Oregon
- Citizenship: U.S.
- Education: Washington University in St. Louis (1862, 1866); Harvard Divinity School (1865)
- Occupation: Minister
- Known for: Church minister, serving the community
- Spouse: Henrietta Robins Mack
- Parent(s): William Greenleaf Eliot, Abigail Adams Cranch

Thomas Lamb Eliot (October 13, 1841 – April 28, 1936) was an American Unitarian minister and a community leader in Portland, Oregon. He was a founder of Reed College, president of the Oregon Humane Society, a director of the Portland Art Association, and director of the Library Association of Portland. He was a minister of the First Unitarian Church of Portland.

== Early life and education ==
Thomas Lamb Eliot was born in St. Louis, Missouri, as the first son of Rev. William Greenleaf Eliot, D.D., of the Church of the Messiah in St. Louis. He came from a prominent St. Louis family of Unitarians; one of his nephews was T. S. Eliot. An injury to his eyes interrupted his education at Washington University in St. Louis, which his father helped found and administer. Hoping to improve his eyes, he sailed around Cape Horn to California in 1860 where Thomas Starr King said to him, "The Pacific Coast claims everyone who has ever seen it—there’s Oregon!" His sight was not remedied by the trip, and upon his return, for several months of Divinity school he had to have his books read aloud to him.

Eliot was in the first class to graduate from Washington University in St. Louis in 1862.

Eliot enlisted in the Union Army, but never engaged in battle. He fired his musket once under orders to shoot a deserter, but he missed. After graduation he enlisted in the Home Guard of Missouri, but served only within the state. For two years he ran a mission house for the poor of St. Louis connected to his father's church while studying with his father for the ministry.

He married Henrietta Robins Mack of St. Louis on November 28, 1865.

He graduated from Harvard Divinity School in 1865, doing two years of study in one, despite eyesight so poor his books were often read to him. In 1866 he earned a Master of Arts from Washington University.

== Ministry ==
Eliot ministered in Louisville, Kentucky and, for several weeks at a spell, assisted the Church of the Messiah in New Orleans.

Eliot was recruited in 1867 by churches in Portland, Maine; New Orleans, Louisiana; and Portland, Oregon. He accepted the offer from Oregon, from the newly built First Unitarian Church, having wanted to relocate to the Pacific Northwest since his first trip to the west coast. He moved to Portland with Henrietta and their infant son, traveling through New York and Panama. By 1869 when Dorothea Dix visited Portland, Eliot also began holding one outreach service per month at institutions in town including the Insane Asylum of East Portland, the County Jail, and the County Farm. He also occasionally hosted services at the Oro Fino saloon. E. Kimbark MacColl stated "Within a decade of his arrival in Portland... he became the city's most influential religious figure."

Eliot was the only minister to greet women's rights advocate Abigail Scott Duniway to Portland.

== Civic legacy ==
One historian noted Eliot's pervasive role in the civic and cultural life of the city, observing that he "played a central role in creating and shaping the educational, cultural, and civic landscape of Portland. He had a hand in steering virtually every major public institution in the city, crowning his career with an achievement that would have made his father proud: the founding of Reed College." Another wrote that Eliot "founded the First Unitarian Church, the Oregon Humane Society, and the Boys & Girls Aid Society; worked to improve conditions in the county jail; ministered to orphans, the poor, and the mentally ill; championed public schools, the public library, and women's right to vote." He was a board member of the "Portland Art Association and the Library Association of Portland, steering those organizations toward the founding of the Portland Art Museum and the Portland Public Library (now the Multnomah County Library)." Upon Reed College's opening in 1911, Eliot was named chair of the board of trustees, serving there until 1924. In 1935, the arts and sciences building on campus was named for Eliot to "honor his dedication and service to the college."

== See also ==
- Eliot, Portland, Oregon
- Eliot Glacier
- Eliot Hall
