= Samuel Atkins Eliot Jr. =

American writer (1893–1984)

- Born: March 14, 1893; Denver, Colorado, US
- Died: August 3, 1984 (aged 91)
- Education: Harvard University
- Family: Eliot family

Samuel Atkins Eliot Jr. (March 14, 1893 – August 3, 1984) was an American writer on theatre, translator, and academic, born in Denver, Colorado and educated at Harvard University.

== Early life ==
He was the son of Samuel Atkins Eliot, a prominent Unitarian clergyman, and the grandson of Charles W. Eliot, a president of Harvard University.

His family, the Eliots, were a Boston Brahmin family.

== Professional career ==
After leaving Harvard in 1913, Samuel Eliot Jr. worked in theatre. He was connected with the Little Theatre in New York, was director of the Little Theatre in Indianapolis, and acted with the Washington Square Players in New York.

In 1918, he published the first of his four edited volumes of Little Theatre Classics (1918–21), designed to provide adaptations of classic plays in various languages for community and small theatres. In the same year, he was taken on at Smith College, where he taught playwriting and post-medieval drama and instituted a theatre production course. In 1920, he directed and starred in the first North American performance of Pericles Prince of Tyre as part of his newly established Smith Theatre Workshop.

He published a number of translations of the works of German playwright Frank Wedekind, including the "Lulu plays", Erdgeist (Earth Spirit, 1914–15) and Die Büchse der Pandora (Pandora's Box, 1914). These were collected, together with his translations of Frühlings Erwachen (Spring Awakening) and Tod und Teufel (Damnation) in a single volume as Tragedies of Sex (Boni and Liveright, New York, 1923).

He also wrote a book on birds of the Connecticut Valley.
