= Samuel Eliot (historian) =

American historian (1821–1898)

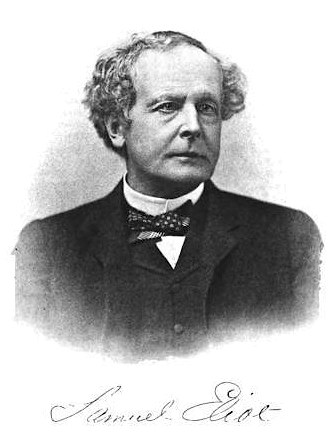

3rd Superintendent of Boston Public Schools
- In office 1878–1880
- Preceded by: John Dudley Philbrick
- Succeeded by: Edwin P. Seaver

Personal details
- Born: December 22, 1821 Boston, Massachusetts, U.S.
- Died: September 14, 1898 (aged 76) Beverly Farms, Beverly, Massachusetts, U.S.
- Cause of death: Heart trouble
- Resting place: Mount Auburn Cemetery, Middlesex County, Massachusetts, U.S.
- Spouse: Emily Marshall Otis (m. 1853)
- Children: 1
- Parent(s): William Havard Eliot; Margaret Boies (Bradford) Eliot
- Relatives: Samuel Eliot (grandfather); Alden Bradford (grandfather); Charles Eliot Norton (cousin); Samuel Eliot Morison (grandson)
- Education: Harvard College
- Occupation: Historian; educator; statesman

Samuel Eliot (December 22, 1821 – September 14, 1898) was an American historian, educator, and statesman of Boston, Massachusetts and Hartford, Connecticut.

== Biography ==
Eliot was born in Boston, the son of William Havard Eliot (1796 - 1831) and Margaret Boies (Bradford) Eliot, and the grandson of banker Samuel Eliot. His father built the Tremont House, participated in the musical life of the city, had variants of his names including Hayward, Harvard, Havard, Howard, and Elliott, and died suddenly in 1831 while campaigning for mayor. His mother was a daughter of Alden Bradford. Charles Eliot Norton was Eliot's cousin.

Eliot graduated first in the class of 1839 at Harvard College and, after two years in a counting house in Boston, toured for four years in Europe in the early 1840s. During the decade following his return, he devoted himself to writing. However, on June 7, 1853, Eliot married Emily Marshall Otis (1832-1906) of Boston, and his writing career gradually drew to a close. Their daughter, Emily Marshall Eliot Morison, was the mother of noted historian Samuel Eliot Morison (1887–1976).

In 1856, Eliot became professor of history and political science at Trinity College in Hartford, Connecticut, and then served as Trinity's president from 1860 to 1864. In 1864 Eliot returned to Boston, though he continued to teach classes at Trinity until 1874. At Harvard, he was an overseer from 1866 to 1872 and a lecturer in history from 1870 to 1873. He also served from 1868 to 1872 as president of the American Social Science Association. From 1872 to 1876 he served as headmaster of the Boston Girls' High and Normal School, and from 1878 to 1880 as superintendent of Boston Public Schools, later serving from 1885 to 1888 on the Boston School Committee.

Eliot was a trustee of Massachusetts General Hospital and of the Massachusetts School for the Feeble-Minded, and for 26 years a member and president of the board of trustees of the Perkins Institute for the Blind. He was also active as a trustee, director, etc., for Museum of Fine Arts, Boston, the Boston Athenaeum, the American Academy of Arts and Sciences, the Massachusetts Bible Society, and the Massachusetts Historical Society.

Eliot died of heart trouble on September 14, 1898, at Beverly Farms, Massachusetts, and is buried at Mount Auburn Cemetery.

== Selected works ==
- Translations from the Spanish Poet José Zorilla, (1846).
- Passages from the History of Liberty, (1847).
- The Liberty of Rome, (2 volumes, 1849) which was revised to form Part I of the History of Liberty: Part I, The Ancient Romans; Part II, The Early Christians, (4 volumes, 1853).
- Manual of United States History: From 1492 to 1850, (1856).
- Manual of the United States: From 1492 to 1872, (1874).
- Poetry for Children, (1879).
- Selections from American Authors: A Reading Book for School and Home, (1879).
- The Arabian Nights' Entertainments: Six Stories, (1880).

Educational offices
Preceded by Daniel Raynes Goodwin	President of Trinity College; 1860–1864	Succeeded by John Barrett Kerfoot
Preceded by Ephraim Hunt	Headmaster of the Girls' High School; 1872–1876	Succeeded by Homer Sprague
Preceded by John Dudley Philbrick	Superintendent of Boston Public Schools; 1878–1880	Succeeded by Edwin P. Seaver
