= William Greenleaf Eliot =

American academic (1811–1887)

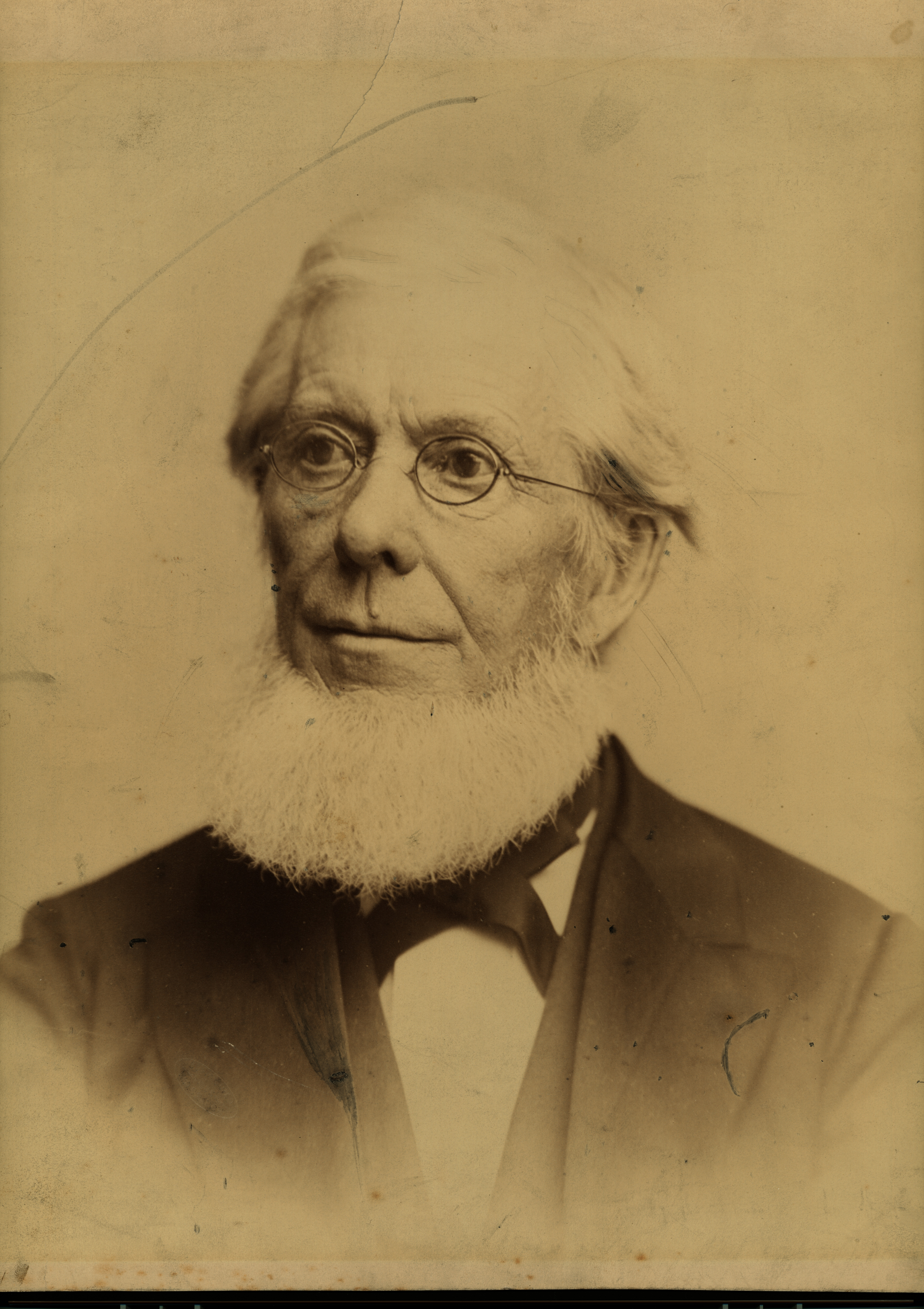

Chancellor of Washington University in St. Louis
- In office 1870–1887
- Preceded by: Abram Litton
- Succeeded by: Marshall Snow

Personal details
- Born: August 5, 1811 New Bedford, Massachusetts, U.S.
- Died: January 23, 1887 (aged 75) Pass Christian, Mississippi, U.S.
- Spouse: Abigail Adams Cranch (m. 1834)
- Children: 14, including Thomas and Henry
- Relatives: Eliot family
- Education: George Washington University; Harvard Divinity School

William Greenleaf Eliot (August 5, 1811 – January 23, 1887) was an American educator, Unitarian minister, and civic leader in Missouri. He is most notable for founding Washington University in St. Louis, and also contributed to the founding of numerous other civic institutions, such as the Saint Louis Art Museum, public school system, and charitable institutions. The modernist poet T. S. Eliot was his grandson.

== Early life and education ==
Eliot was born in New Bedford, Massachusetts, the son of Margaret Greenleaf (Dawes) and William Greenleaf Eliot. Eliot attended the Friends Academy in New Bedford.

Eliot attended Columbian College, which is now George Washington University, in Washington, D.C., where he graduated in 1831. He then attended Harvard Divinity School, where he graduated in 1834. The same year, on August 17, he was ordained as a minister of the Unitarian church.

== Career ==
=== Unitarian minister ===
After his ordination, Eliot moved to St. Louis, where he lived until his death in 1887. In St. Louis, he founded the Church of the Messiah, the first Unitarian church west of the Mississippi River, which is currently the First Unitarian Church of Saint Louis. He led the congregation from 1834 to 1870, which included a period of rapid expansion in the city.

=== Community involvement ===
Eliot was active in civic life and was instrumental in founding many civic institutions, including the St. Louis Public Schools, the Saint Louis Art Museum, Mission Free School, South Side Day Nursery, and the Western Sanitary Commission to provide medical care and supplies during the Civil War. In 1861, he was part of a small group of men who helped Generals Nathaniel Lyon and Francis P. Blair to retain Missouri in the Union. He contributed to the development of the Colored Orphans' Home, Soldiers' Orphans' Home, Memorial Home, Blind Girls' Home, Women's Christian Home, and other charitable institutions. When Ralph Waldo Emerson visited St. Louis, he met Eliot and called him "the Saint of the West."

Eliot publicly associated himself with the American Colonization Society and served as president of the St. Louis's Young Men's Colonization Society. Despite his anti-slavery beliefs and acts of emancipating slaves and assisting in emancipation, he did not agree with Northern abolitionist politics but instead supported gradual emancipation to avoid Civil War.

=== Washington University in St. Louis ===
Eliot had a strong interest in developing educational opportunities in St. Louis. In 1853, he co-founded Washington University in St. Louis, initially called Eliot Seminary to his chagrin. He donated funds to its construction and served as its chancellor from 1870 to 1887. In 1859 he founded Mary Institute, a school for girls which he named after his daughter, who died young. It is now part of the co-educational Mary Institute and St. Louis Country Day School.

=== Author ===
Eliot was also a writer, publishing Doctrines of Christianity; Lectures to Young Men; Lectures to Young Women (re-printed as Home and Influence); Discipline of Sorrow; and The Story of Archer Alexander: From Slavery to Freedom. These ranged from works of theology in the Unitarian tradition to specific moral advice to young people. He advocated individual responsibility. In public policy, he supported women's suffrage and prohibition of alcohol.

== Legacy and honors ==
- Eliot was honored for his civic contributions with a star on the St. Louis Walk of Fame.
- Eliot Unitarian Chapel in Kirkwood, Missouri, is named for W. G. Eliot.

== Personal life ==
The Eliots had 14 children but not all survived to adulthood. Among their children were Rev. Thomas Lamb Eliot, Regent and Trustee of Reed College, and Henry Ware Eliot, businessman. W.G. Eliot was the grandfather of poet T. S. Eliot, Martha May Eliot, a pediatrician and expert in public health and her sister, Abigail Adams Eliot, co-founder of the Eliot-Pearson School at Tufts University.

Dr. Eliot was the brother of Thomas D. Eliot, U.S. Congressman from Massachusetts. William Greenleaf Eliot's wife, Abigail Adams Cranch, was the daughter of William Cranch, a nephew of Abigail Adams. William G. Eliot's father, mother, and wife were first cousins of each other. Their mothers were three of the daughters of William Greenleaf (Elizabeth, Margaret and Nancy respectively.)

Ancestors of William Greenleaf Eliot

4. Samuel Eliot
2. William Greenleaf Eliot Sr.
10. William Greenleaf
5. Elizabeth Greenleaf
11. Mary Brown
1. William Greenleaf Eliot
12. Thomas Dawes
6. Thomas Dawes
13. Hannah Blake
3. Margaret Greenleaf Dawes
14. William Greenleaf (=10)
7. Margaret Greenleaf
15. Mary Brown (=11)
