= Samuel Eliot (banker) =

American banker and businessman (1739-1820)

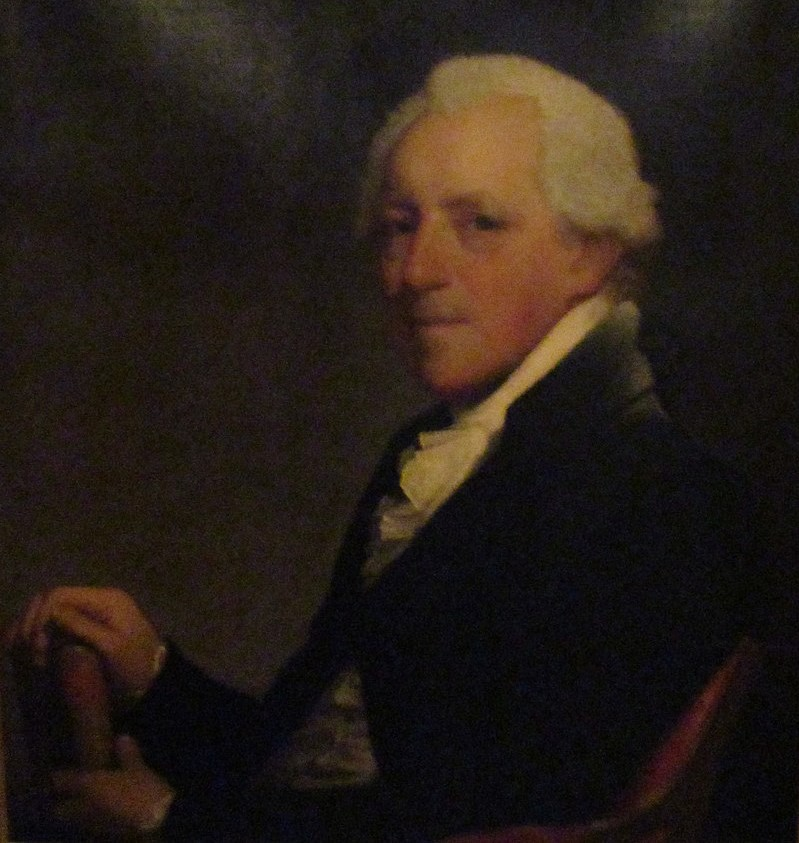

President, Massachusetts Bank

Personal details
- Born: August 25, 1739 Boston, Massachusetts
- Died: January 18, 1820
- Spouse: Catherine Atkins
- Children: Samuel Atkins Eliot
- Relatives: Eliot family
- Education: Boston Latin School

Samuel Eliot (1739–1820) was an American banker and businessman from the prominent Eliot family of Boston. He served as President of Massachusetts Bank, and was a highly successful Boston merchant, owning and operating what was then the precursor to 19th- and 20th-century style department stores. At the time of his death, he had amassed one of the largest fortunes in Boston. He was an important early benefactor of Massachusetts General Hospital.

He was descended from the Eliot family of South England.

He was born to Samuel Eliot, a Boston publisher and bookseller; and Elizabeth Marshall, from the West Indies.

Eliot married Elizabeth Barrell of Boston, and married a second time in 1786 to Catherine Atkins, daughter of Dudley and Sarah (née Kent) Atkins of Newburyport, Massachusetts. The second marriage produced six children, one being Samuel Atkins Eliot.

He was the grandfather of Samuel Eliot, Charles Eliot Norton and Charles William Eliot. His granddaughter, Mary Elizabeth Bray (1810–86), was married to Hamburg banker Johann Heinrich Gossler III (1805–1879), owner of Berenberg Bank and a member of the Berenberg-Gossler banking dynasty. Mary was the mother of Baron Johann von Berenberg-Gossler.

Eliot founded the Eliot Chair of Greek Literature at Harvard and was a corresponding member of the American Philosophical Society (1768). In 1806, he was elected a Fellow of the American Academy of Arts and Sciences.
