= List of Privy Counsellors (1936–1952) =

This is a list of privy counsellors of the United Kingdom appointed between the accession of King Edward VIII in 1936 and the death of King George VI in 1952.

== Edward VIII, 1936 ==
- Sir Akbar Hydari (1869–1942)
- Sir George Rich (1863–1956)
- The Duke of Norfolk (1908–1975)
- Michael Joseph Savage (1872–1940)
- The Earl De La Warr (1900–1976)
- John Colville (1894–1954)
- Euan Wallace (1892–1941)
- The Duke of Beaufort (1900–1984)
- The Duke of Sutherland (1888–1963)
- The Hon. Alec Hardinge (1894–1960)
- William Morrison (1893–1961)

== George VI, 1936–1952 ==
=== 1937 ===
- The Lord Hutchison of Montrose (1873–1950)
- Robert Menzies (1894–1978)
- John Stephen Curlewis (1863–1940)
- The Duke of Buccleuch (1894–1973)
- Sir Harry Eve (1856–1940)
- Sir Nevile Henderson (1882–1942)
- Prince George, Duke of Kent (1902–1942)
- Leslie Burgin (1887–1945)
- Ernest Lapointe (1876–1941)
- Sir Patrick Duncan (1870–1943)
- The Viscount Galway (1882–1943)
- The Lord Gowrie (1872–1955)
- The Lord Tweedsmuir (1875–1940)
- Sir Felix Cassel, Bt (1869–1953)
- Isaac Foot (1880–1960)
- Sir George Courthope, Bt (1877–1955)
- Frederick Pethick-Lawrence (1871–1962)
- The Hon. Sir Hugh O'Neill (1883–1982)
- The Lord Snell (1865–1944)
- Sir Frank MacKinnon (1871–1946)
- Sir Thomas Horridge (1857–1938)
- Sir George Talbot (1861–1938)
- Sir Robert Craigie (1883–1959)

=== 1938 ===
- Sir John Anderson (1882–1958)
- Robert Hudson (1886–1957)
- The Earl of Lucan (1860–1949)
- Sir Albert Clauson (1870–1946)
- The Lord Porter (1877–1956)
- James Stratford (1869–1952)
- Sir Donald Somervell (1889–1960)
- The Viscount Finlay (1875–1945)
- Sir Fairfax Luxmoore (1876–1944)
- Sir Rayner Goddard (1877–1971)
- Sir Herbert du Parcq (1880–1949)

=== 1939 ===
- The Viscount Chilston (1876–1947)
- Rab Butler (1902–1982)
- Harry Crookshank (1893–1961)
- Sir Reginald Dorman-Smith (1899–1977)
- The Lord Chatfield (1873–1967)
- M. R. Jayakar (1873–1959)
- Richard Casey (1890–1976)
- The Hon. James Stuart (1897–1971)
- Herwald Ramsbotham (1887–1971)
- Sir Philip Macdonell (1873–1940)
- The Marquess of Lothian (1882–1940)
- The Lord Hankey (1877–1963)
- Geoffrey Fisher (1887–1972)
- Sir Ronald Campbell (1883–1953)
- Nicolaas Jacobus de Wet (1873–1960)

=== 1940 ===
- Sir Andrew Duncan (1884–1952)
- Sir George Branson (1871–1951)
- Sir John Reith (1889–1971)
- The Lord Woolton (1883–1964)
- Ernest Bevin (1881–1951)
- Brendan Bracken (1901–1958)
- Sir Walter Citrine (1887–1983)
- Ronald Cross (1896–1968)
- Hugh Dalton (1887–1962)
- Sir Charles Edwards (1867–1954)
- Sir Percy Harris, Bt (1876–1952)
- Sir Robert Vansittart (1881–1957)
- Peter Fraser (1884–1950)
- The Duke of Hamilton (1903–1973)
- Viscount Cranborne (1893–1972)
- John Moore-Brabazon (1884–1964)
- Oliver Lyttelton (1893–1972)
- Arthur Blaikie Purvis (1890–1941)

=== 1941 ===
- Douglas Clifton Brown (1879–1958)
- Sir Walter Womersley (1878–1961)
- Sir Arthur Salter (1881–1975)
- Frederick Leathers (1883–1965)
- John Llewellin (1893–1957)
- Vincent Massey (1887–1967)
- James Reid (1890–1975)
- Sir Miles Lampson (1880–1964)
- The Hon. Sir Stafford Cripps (1889–1952)
- Raoul Dandurand (1861–1942)
- Gwilym Lloyd George (1894–1967)
- Harold Balfour (1897–1988)
- Tom Williams (1888–1967)
- Sir Sidney Abrahams (1885–1957)
- Sir Chettur Madhavan Nair (1879–1970)

=== 1942 ===
- Harold Macmillan (1894–1986)
- Sir James Grigg (1890–1964)
- The Lord Portal (1885–1949)
- John Curtin (1885–1945)
- Arthur Fadden (1894–1973)
- H. V. Evatt (1894–1965)
- Cyril Garbett (1875–1955)
- George Hall (1881–1965)

=== 1943 ===
- Richard Law (1901–1980)
- Osbert Peake (1897–1966)
- William Whiteley (1882–1955)
- The Lord Cherwell (1886–1957)
- The Lord Templemore (1880–1953)
- Geoffrey Lloyd (1902–1984)
- Joseph Westwood (1884–1948)
- Harcourt Johnstone (1895–1945)
- Sir Alan Lascelles (1887–1981)
- The Viscount Wavell (1883–1950)
- Henry Willink (1894–1973)
- Ernest Frederick Watermeyer (1880–1958)
- Ben Smith (1879–1964)

=== 1944 ===
- Ralph Assheton (1901–1984)
- Sir Archibald Clark Kerr (1882–1951)
- William Mabane (1895–1969)
- Wilfred Paling (1883–1971)
- Charles Waterhouse (1893–1975)
- Sir Gavin Simonds (1881–1971)
- James Chuter Ede (1882–1965)
- Frank Forde (1890–1983)
- The Hon. Sir Geoffrey Lawrence (1880–1971)
- Sir John Beaumont (1877–1974)
- Sir Fergus Morton (1887–1973)
- Duncan Sandys (1908–1987)
- Sir Edward Grigg (1879–1955)

=== 1945 ===
- Florence Horsbrugh (1889–1969)
- Ellen Wilkinson (1891–1947)
- The Lord Croft (1881–1947)
- Jack Lawson (1881–1965)
- James Milner (1889–1967)
- Sir Geoffrey Shakespeare, Bt (1893–1980)
- Will Thorne (1857–1946)
- Graham White (1880–1965)
- Sir Richard Hopkins (1880–1955)
- The Earl of Rosebery (1882–1974)
- Sir David Maxwell Fyfe (1900–1967)
- Ben Chifley (1885–1951)
- Alfred Barnes (1887–1974)
- George Isaacs (1883–1979)
- John Wilmot (1893–1964)
- Aneurin Bevan (1897–1960)
- Manny Shinwell (1884–1986)
- George Thomson (1893–1962)
- William Wand (1885–1977)
- The Lord Winster (1885–1961)
- Jim Griffiths (1890–1975)
- Sir Cuthbert Headlam, Bt (1876–1964)
- Malcolm McCorquodale (1901–1971)
- Lewis Silkin (1889–1972)
- George Tomlinson (1890–1952)
- Ted Williams (1890–1963)
- The Lord Ammon (1873–1960)
- The Duke of Abercorn (1869–1953)
- Jan Hendrik Hofmeyr (1894–1948)
- Sir James Tucker (1888–1975)
- Gideon Brand van Zyl (1873–1956)
- Philip Noel-Baker (1889–1982)
- Sir Alfred Townsend Bucknill (1880–1963)

=== 1946 ===
- Jack Beasley (1895–1949)
- Sir Travers Humphreys (1867–1956)
- James Lorimer Ilsley (1894–1967)
- Bill Jordan (1879–1959)
- Walter Nash (1882–1968)
- Louis St. Laurent (1882–1973)
- The Lord Uthwatt (1879–1949)
- The Hon. Sir Cyril Asquith (1890–1954)
- Sir Lionel Cohen (1888–1973)
- John Strachey (1901–1963)
- The Hon. Sir Alexander Cadogan (1884–1968)
- The Viscount Mersey (1872–1956)
- C. D. Howe (1886–1960)
- The Earl of Listowel (1906–1997)
- Sir Hartley Shawcross (1902–2003)
- The Lord Nathan (1889–1963)
- Frederick Bellenger (1894–1968)
- Arthur Creech Jones (1891–1964)
- Hector McNeil (1907–1955)

=== 1947 ===
- Clement Davies (1884–1962)
- James Gardiner (1883–1962)
- Glenvil Hall (1887–1962)
- Arthur Henderson (1893–1968)
- Ian Alistair Mackenzie (1890–1949)
- Charles Key (1883–1964)
- The Earl Mountbatten of Burma (1900–1979)
- The Lord Inman (1892–1979)
- Lord Moncrieff (1870–1949)
- Sir Frederic Wrottesley (1880–1948)
- Sir Raymond Evershed (1899–1966)
- John MacDermott (1896–1979)
- Sir Norman Birkett (1883–1962)
- The Lord Catto (1879–1959)
- Ness Edwards (1897–1968)
- Sir Godfrey Huggins (1883–1971)
- George Mathers (1886–1965)
- Harold Wilson (1916–1995)
- Thibaudeau Rinfret (1879–1962)
- Hugh Gaitskell (1906–1963)
- John Wheatley (1908–1988)
- Arthur Woodburn (1890–1978)
- George Strauss (1901–1993)

=== 1948 ===
- George Buchanan (1890–1955)
- David Kirkwood (1872–1955)
- William McKell (1891–1985)
- Sir Malcolm Macnaghten (1869–1955)
- George Heaton Nicholls (1876–1959)
- Sir Humphrey O'Leary (1886–1953)
- The Lord Pakenham (1905–2001)
- Sir Frank Soskice (1902–1979)
- Sir John Singleton (1885–1957)
- Sir Alfred Denning (1899–1999)

=== 1949 ===
- The Lord Hailey (1872–1969)
- Hilary Marquand (1901–1972)
- Edith Summerskill (1901–1980)
- Sir David Jenkins (1899–1969)
- The Lord Radcliffe (1899–1977)
- John Dugdale (1905–1963)
- Sir Oliver Franks (1905–1992)
- The Lord Morrison (1881–1953)
- Lord Patrick (1889–1967)
- Sir Lionel Leach (1883–1960)

=== 1950 ===
- Sir Ronald Campbell (1890–1983)
- Jack Holloway (1875–1967)
- D. S. Senanayake (1883–1952)
- Patrick Gordon Walker (1907–1980)
- Maurice Webb (1904–1956)
- Richard Stokes (1897–1957)
- Sidney Holland (1893–1961)
- The Lord Henderson (1891–1984)

=== 1951 ===
- Sir Owen Dixon (1886–1972)
- The Earl of Drogheda (1884–1957)
- The Lord Macdonald of Gwaenysgor (1888–1966)
- Sir Charles Hodson (1895–1984)
- Alfred Robens (1910–1999)
- George Brown (1914–1985)
- Sir John Morris (1896–1979)
- David Grenfell (1881–1968)
- The Hon. Kenneth Younger (1908–1976)
- The Lord Ogmore (1903–1976)
- The Lord Ismay (1887–1965)
- Sir Walter Monckton (1891–1965)
- Patrick Buchan-Hepburn (1901–1974)
- Selwyn Lloyd (1904–1978)
- Peter Thorneycroft (1909–1994)
- The Lord de L'Isle and Dudley (1909–1991)
- James Thomas (1903–1960)
- David Eccles (1904–1999)
- Antony Head (1906–1983)
- Sir Thomas Dugdale, Bt (1897–1977)
- Alan Lennox-Boyd (1904–1983)
- James Latham Clyde (1898–1975)
- The Earl of Home (1903–1995)
- Princess Elizabeth, Duchess of Edinburgh (1926–2022)
- Prince Philip, Duke of Edinburgh (1921–2021)
- Sir Charles Romer (1897–1969)
- Arthur Bottomley (1907–1995)
- Douglas Jay (1907–1996)
- The Lord Shepherd (1881–1954)
- Robert Taylor (1881–1954)

=== 1952 ===
- Sir Ulick Alexander (1889–1973)
- Charles Williams (1886–1955)
