= Baron Killearn =

Barony in the Peerage of the United Kingdom

Baron Killearn, of Killearn in the County of Stirling, is a title in the Peerage of the United Kingdom. It was created in 1943 for the diplomat Sir Miles Lampson. He was the second son of Norman Lampson, the youngest son of Sir Curtis Lampson, 1st Baronet, of Rowfant (see below). Lord Killearn's eldest son, the second Baron, succeeded his second cousin once removed as fourth Baronet in 1971. On his death, the titles passed to his half-brother, the third and (As of 2017) present holder of the barony and baronetcy.

The Lampson Baronetcy, of Rowfant in the County of Sussex, was created in the Baronetage of the United Kingdom in 1866 for the Anglo-American businessman Curtis Lampson. His grandson, the third Baronet, was an author, journalist and explorer, notably in Central and West Africa. On his death in 1971 the title was inherited by his second cousin once removed, the aforementioned third Baron Killearn (see above).

The family seat is Little Sodbury Manor, near Chipping Sodbury, South Gloucestershire.

== Barons Killearn (1943) ==
- Miles Wedderburn Lampson, 1st Baron Killearn (1880–1964)
- Graham Curtis Lampson, 2nd Baron Killearn (1919–1996)
- Victor Miles George Aldous Lampson, 3rd Baron Killearn (b. 1941)

The heir apparent is the present holder's eldest son, Hon. Miles Henry Morgan Lampson (b. 1977)
The heir apparent's heir apparent is his son, Alfred Victor Christopher Lampson (b. 2009)

== Lampson baronets, of Rowfant (1866) ==
- Sir Curtis Miranda Lampson, 1st Baronet (1806–1885)
- Sir George Curtis Lampson, 2nd Baronet (1833–1899)
- Sir Curtis George Lampson, 3rd Baronet (1890–1971)
- Sir Graham Curtis Lampson, 4th Baronet (1919–1996) (had already succeeded as Baron Killearn in 1964)

see above for further succession

== Arms ==
Coat of arms of Baron Killearn
Crest A gryphon's head erased Gules charged with an escarbuncle Argent between two wings paly of four Argent and Gules. Escutcheon Per saltire Argent and Gules two gryphons' heads in fess and as many escarbuncles in pale counterchanged. Supporters Dexter a camel Proper with head stall and rope reflexed over the back Gules, sinister a Chinese dragon also Proper. Motto Persevera Et Vince (Persevere And Conquer)

== See also ==
- Jacquetta Eliot, Countess of St Germans
- Frederick Locker-Lampson
- Haremere Hall
