= Ronald Hugh Campbell =

British diplomat (1883–1953)

Campbell in 1938.

Sir Ronald Hugh Campbell GCMG PC (27 September 1883 – 15 November 1953) was a British diplomat who held several important positions including that of British ambassador to France from July 1939 to 22 June 1940, when the armistice between Germany and France was signed at Compiègne.

He was appointed British ambassador in Paris from the post of British envoy to Yugoslavia, a considerable jump in promotion that was extremely rare in the diplomatic service. Such an important position is normally reserved for diplomats who have passed through several legations and other embassies. However, it was long recognized that Campbell possessed outstanding abilities. Following the fall of France in June 1940, he was evacuated through Saint-Jean-de-Luz on HMS Galatea on 24 June and returned to London. In November of the same year he was transferred to Lisbon to act as British ambassador. At Lisbon Campbell was instrumental in securing exit visas from Nazi-occupied Europe for Jewish Rabbis and their families, using the Red Cross and neutral diplomats to get the documents to those who needed them. The visas allowed for entry into Portugal and were ostensibly for onward travel to the British colony of Mauritius but in effect allowed the refugees to travel across Europe ultimately to safety in Palestine. This effort was recognised by the Chief Rabbi who wrote to the Foreign Secretary Anthony Eden in March 1944 to praise the efforts of Campbell and his staff. Accepting evidence that the "Mauritius" visas were saving holders from extermination, in June 1944 the British Colonial Office increased the number of visas to be issued to over 1,000 Rabbis and their families. Sir Ronald made a further critical contribution to the Allied War effort by persuading the Portuguese Government to allow the Azores to be used as a base for the Allies in the Battle of the Atlantic. He retired from the Foreign Office at the end of his period of service as British ambassador to Portugal in July 1945. He died in 1953. His obituary in The Times said "he had long been recognised as one of the ablest and soundest men in the service and was recognised to possess special qualifications". At Lisbon, "a post of first importance", the obituarist recorded, "he gave invaluable services to his country...though much of his work has had necessarily to remain secret".

Diplomatic posts
Preceded by Sir Nevile Henderson	Envoy Extraordinary and Minister Plenipotentiary at Belgrade; 1935–1939	Succeeded by Sir Ronald I. Campbell
Preceded by Sir Eric Phipps	British Ambassador to France; 1939–1940	Vacant German occupation of France during World War II Title next held by Duff Cooper
Preceded by Sir Walford Selby	British Ambassador to Portugal; 1940–1945	Succeeded by Sir Owen O'Malley
