= Malcolm Yapp =

British historian (1931–2025)

Malcolm Edward Yapp (29 May 1931 – 14 June 2025) was a British historian who was a professor of the modern history of Western Asia at the School of Oriental and African Studies in London. He died on 14 June 2025, at the age of 94.

== Works ==
- "Two British historians of Persia", in Bernard Lewis & Peter Malcolm Holt, eds., Historians of the Middle East, 1962.
- (ed. with V. J. Parry) War, Technology and Society in the Middle East, 1975.
- (ed. with David Taylor) Political Identity in South Asia, 1979.
- Chingis Khan and the Mongol Empire, 1980.
- Strategies of British India: Britain, Iran, and Afghanistan, 1798–1850, 1980.
- The Making of the Modern Near East, 1792–1923, 1987.
- "Europe in the Turkish mirror", Past and Present, 137 (1992), pp. 134–55.
- The Near East since the First World War: A History to 1995, 1991.
- (ed.) Politics and Diplomacy in Egypt: The Diaries of Sir Miles Lampson 1935–1937, 1997.
- "The Legend of the Great Game". Proceedings of the British Academy, no. 111, 2001, pp. 179–198.
