= Curtis Lampson =

Anglo-American fur merchant and telecom executive (1806–1885)

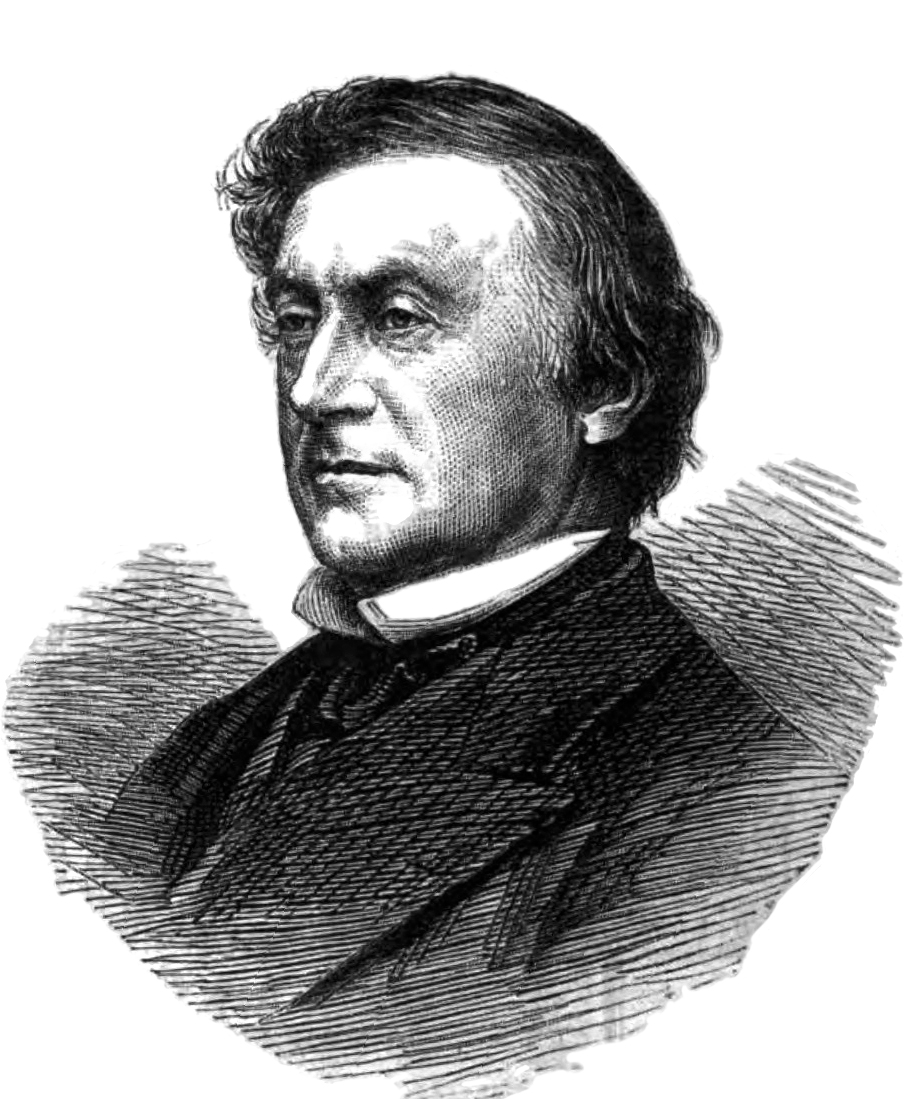
Curtis Lampson, 1866 engraving (The Illustrated London News)

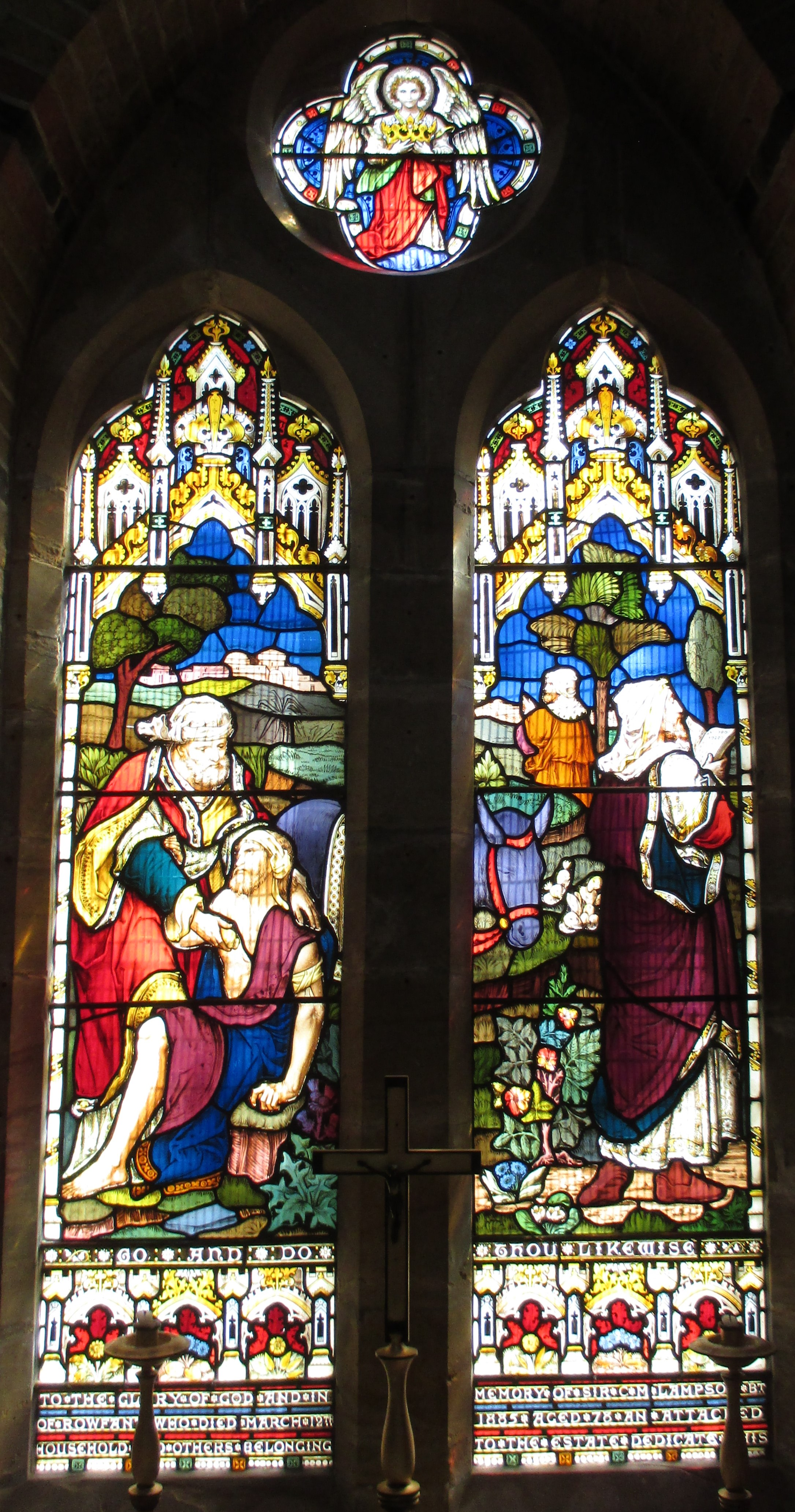
Stained-glass window in St John the Evangelist's Church, Copthorne, West Sussex dedicated to Curtis Lampson's memory.

Sir Curtis Miranda Lampson, 1st Baronet (21 September 1806 – 12 March 1885) was an Anglo-American fur merchant, best remembered for his promotion of the transatlantic telegraph cable.

== Life ==
Born in New Haven, Vermont, to American Revolutionary soldier, William Lampson (1761–1827) and Rachel Powell (1766–1813), he started work as a clerk before moving to New York and then, in 1830, to London as John Jacob Astor's agent. He established the business of C. M. Lampson & Co. and became a naturalised British citizen on 14 May 1849.

He was elected to the board of directors of the Atlantic Telegraph Company on its formation in 1856 and served it over the next decade. His endeavours, along with those of the other principals, were recognised on 16 November 1866 when Lampson was created a baronet. He is said to have been the first former US citizen to have been so honoured. His other appointments included as deputy governor of the Hudson's Bay Company and as one of the trustees of the Peabody Donation Fund.

He died at his London house, 80 Eaton Square, Westminster, on 12 March 1885 and was buried at Worth in the parish church of his country home at Rowfant.

== Family ==
He was married in 1827 to Jane Walter Sibley, of Sutton, Massachusetts, a relative of Judge Solomon Sibley and a distant relation of the Confederate general Henry Hopkins Sibley. He was succeeded in the baronetcy by his eldest son George. His second son Henry pre-deceased him. His youngest son Norman George was the father of the prominent diplomat Miles Wedderburn Lampson, who was elevated to the peerage as Baron Killearn in 1943. His only daughter, Hannah Jane, was married to the poet Frederick Locker. Their children included the British Conservative MPs, Godfrey Locker-Lampson and Oliver Locker-Lampson.

His son-in-law Frederick Locker-Lampson included this pen portrait of Sir Curtis in his posthumously published memoirs, My Confidences (1896): "I am told that as a youth he was wise beyond his years and intelligent in advance of his experience ... He has foresight, judgment, a clear apprehension of men and affairs, a strong will and a sweet temper, and his success in life may be attributed to his own and sole exertions - Sapientia duce, fortuna permittente." His grandson, Godfrey Locker-Lampson, wrote of him:

Wherever he went people would regard him with attention and admiration, for he was tall and broad-shouldered, with a distinguished carriage and handsome head. There was a great dignity about him and yet a gentleness that won you over, a grave somewhat stern expression, but illumined by a smile that was irresistible; and combined with all these, a character for integrity in all his dealings that nothing ever smirched.

== Notes ==
Baronetage of the United Kingdom
New creation	Baronet (of Rowfant); 1866–1885	Succeeded by George Curtis Lampson
