= Nevile Henderson =

British diplomat (1882–1942)

The Right Honourable Sir Nevile Henderson GCMG
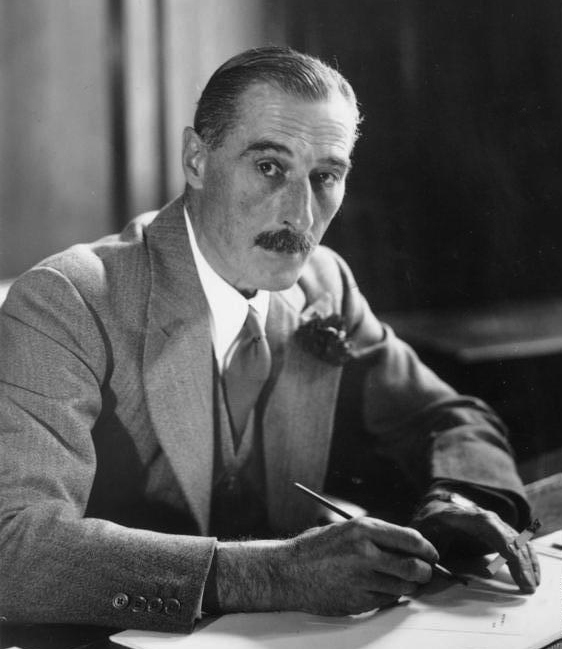
- Ambassador Henderson in office, May 1937

British Ambassador to Germany
- In office 28 May 1937 – 3 September 1939
- Monarch: George VI
- Preceded by: Eric Phipps
- Succeeded by: Sir Brian Robertson (1949)

British Ambassador to Argentina
- In office 1935–1937
- Monarchs: George V (1935–36); Edward VIII (1936); George VI (1936–37)
- Prime Minister: Stanley Baldwin
- Preceded by: Henry Chilton
- Succeeded by: Esmond Ovey

British Minister to Yugoslavia
- In office 21 November 1929 – 1935
- Monarch: George V
- Prime Minister: Ramsay MacDonald
- Preceded by: Sir Howard William Kennard
- Succeeded by: Sir Ronald Ian Campbell (1939)

Personal details
- Born: 10 April 1882 Sedgwick, Sussex, England
- Died: 30 December 1942 (aged 60) London, England
- Party: Conservative
- Education: Eton College

Sir Nevile Meyrick Henderson GCMG (10 June 1882 – 30 December 1942) was a British diplomat who served as the ambassador of the United Kingdom to Germany from 1937 to 1939.

== Early life and education ==
Henderson was born at Sedgwick Park, near Horsham, Sussex, the third child of Robert Henderson and Emma Caroline Hargreaves. His uncle was Reginald Hargreaves, who married Alice Liddell, the original of Alice in Wonderland. Henderson was very attached to the countryside of Sussex, especially his home of Sedgwick, and wrote in 1940: "Each time that I returned to England the white cliffs of Dover meant Sedgwick for me, and when my mother died in 1931 and my home was sold by my elder brother's wife, something went out of my life which nothing can replace". Henderson was extremely close to his mother, Emma, a strong-willed woman who had successfully managed the estate at Sedgwick after her husband's death in 1895 and developed the gardens of Sedgwick so well that they were photographed by Country Life magazine in 1901. Henderson called his mother "the presiding genius of Sedgwick" who was a "wonderful and masterful woman if ever there was one".

He was educated at Eton and joined the Diplomatic Service in 1905. He was, as one historian notes, "something of a snob", although another historian states that his snobbishness mostly derived from the death of his mother.

Henderson had a great love of sports, guns and hunting, and those who knew him noted he was always most happy when he was out on the hunt. Henderson was also known for his love of clothing and always wore the most expensive Savile Row suits and a red carnation. He was considered to be one of the best-dressed men in the Foreign Office, being obsessed with the proper fashion even during long-distance rail voyages. Henderson's obsession with his wardrobe, social etiquette, and hunting was part of a carefully cultivated image that he sought for himself as a polished Edwardian gentleman.

Henderson never married, but his biographer, Peter Neville, wrote that "women played an important role in his life". Henderson's lifelong bachelorhood did not cause questions about his sexuality; Baron Ernst von Weizsäcker, the State Secretary of the Auswärtiges Amt, wrote in his diary that Henderson was a "ladies' man".

== Ambassador to Turkey ==
In the early 1920s, Henderson was stationed at the embassy in Turkey, where he played an important role in the often difficult relations between Britain and the new Turkish Republic. Henderson had wanted a posting in France, rather than Turkey, where he constantly complained to his superiors about being sent. During his time in Turkey, Henderson played a major role in the negotiations about the Mosul dispute, which had been caused by Turkish President Mustafa Kemal's claim to the Mosul region of Iraq. Henderson was forceful in upholding the British claim to the region, but was prepared to yield to Turkish demands for Constantinople. He argued that Britain had been shown to have a very weak hand by the Chanak Crisis in 1922, which revealed that public opinion in Britain and its dominions was unwilling go to war over the issue.

== Ambassador to France and Yugoslavia ==
Henderson served as an envoy to France in 1928 to 1929 and as Envoy Extraordinary and Minister Plenipotentiary to the Kingdom of Yugoslavia between 1929 and 1935. He did not want the latter post, whose British legation was considered to be an unglamorous post, compared to the "grand embassies" in Paris, Berlin, Rome, Moscow, Vienna, Madrid and Washington. He had been lobbying for a major post in the Paris embassy and, expecting to move back to Paris soon, continued to pay the rent for his apartment there for some time after moving to Belgrade. During his time in Belgrade, Henderson became a very close friend of King Alexander I of Yugoslavia, who shared his love of hunting and guns. In January 1929, having been a constitutional monarch, Alexander had staged a self-coup, abolished democracy and made himself the dictator of Yugoslavia. Following these events, Henderson's dispatches from Belgrade took on a notably pro-Yugoslav tone. His friendship with Alexander notably increased British influence in Yugoslavia, which first brought him attention in the Foreign Office.

As would be the case during his time in Berlin, Henderson took exception to any negative remark in the British press about Yugoslavia and wrote to the Foreign Office to ask if anything could be done to silence such criticism. After Alexander's assassination in Marseille, France, in October 1934, Henderson wrote: "I felt more emotion at King Alexander's funeral than I felt at any other except my mother's". Henderson wrote to a friend in Britain in 1935: "My sixth winter in the Belgrade trenches is the worst of all. The zest has gone out of it with King Alexander gone. It interested me enormously to play Stockmar to his Albert and that made all the difference". Henderson was also in close confidence with Prince Paul, the regent of Yugoslavia on behalf of Alexander's son, Peter II, who was only a boy. In January 1935, the Permanent Under-Secretary at the Foreign Office, Sir Robert "Van" Vansittart sharply rebuked him for a letter he had written to Paul in which Henderson strongly supported Yugoslavia's complaints against Italy. Vansittart complained particularly about Henderson's claim that the Italian government supported Croat and Macedonian separatist terrorists and that Italy had been involved in Alexander's assassination: "Are we convinced of this and do we wish Prince Paul to think that we are convinced of it".

== Ambassador to Argentina ==
In 1935, Henderson became ambassador to Argentina.

== Ambassador to Germany ==
On 28 May 1937, Foreign Secretary Anthony Eden appointed Henderson to be ambassador in Berlin. Harold Macmillan wrote of Eden's choice in his 1966 memoirs:

Why he did so is difficult to understand.... Henderson proved a complete disaster; hysterical, self-opinionated and unreliable. Eden later realised what a terrible mistake he had made.

Eden wanted an ambassador in Berlin who could get along well with dictators, and Vansittart gave him a list of three diplomats who had shown a strong partiality towards autocratic leaders: Henderson, Sir Percy Loraine and Sir Miles Lampson. In his 1956 memoirs, The Mist Procession, Vansittart wrote about the appointment of Henderson: "Nevile Henderson... made such a hit with the dictator [King Alexander] by his skill at shooting that he was ultimately picked for Berlin. All know the consequences". Henderson's promotion from being the ambassador in Buenos Aires to being the ambassador in Berlin, which was regarded as one of the "grand embassies" in the Foreign Office, was a major boost to his ego. Henderson wrote at the time that he believed he had been "specially selected by Providence for the definite mission of, I trusted, helping to preserve the peace of the world". As he crossed the Atlantic on a ship to take him back to Britain, Henderson read Mein Kampf in the original German version to acquaint himself with the thinking of Adolf Hitler. Henderson wrote in his 1940 The Failure of a Mission that he was determined "to see the good side of the Nazi regime as well as the bad, and to explain as objectively as I could its aspirations and viewpoint to His Majesty's Government".

Upon arriving in London, Henderson met the Chancellor of the Exchequer, Neville Chamberlain, who was due to replace Stanley Baldwin as prime minister the next month, for a briefing about the Berlin mission. Some controversy has ensued over just what precisely Chamberlain told Henderson. In Failure of a Mission, Henderson wrote that Chamberlain "outlined to me his views on the general policy towards Germany and I think I may honestly say to the last and bitter end I followed the general line which he set me, all the more easily and faithfully since it corresponded so closely with my own private conception of the service I could best render in Germany to my own country". Henderson was to say that Chamberlain had authorised him to commit "calculated indiscretions" in the pursuit of peace, but the German-born American historian Abraham Ascher wrote that no evidence has emerged to support that claim. T. Philip Conwell-Evans, a British historian who taught German history at Königsberg University, later said Henderson had told him that Chamberlain had made him his personal envoy to Germany who was to bypass Vansittart by taking orders directly from Chamberlain's office. Regardless of what Chamberlain said to Henderson in April 1937, Henderson always seemed to have regarded himself as directly answerable to 10 Downing Street and showed a marked tendency to ignore Vansittart.

A believer in appeasement, Henderson thought Hitler could be controlled and pushed toward peace and cooperation with the Western powers. Like almost all of the British elite in the interwar era, Henderson believed that the Treaty of Versailles was far too harsh on Germany and that if only the terms of Versailles were revised in Germany's favour, another world war could be prevented. Neville wrote that the charge that Henderson was pro-Nazi was incorrect since Henderson had advocated the revision of Versailles in Germany's favour long before Hitler had come to power. By contrast, Ascher credited Henderson's beliefs on avoiding war to his desire to uphold white supremacy and to avoid another "fratricidal" war between white peoples while other peoples started to demand equality. Ascher cited Henderson's dispatch to Eden on 26 January 1938 that warned that another Anglo-German war "would be ... absolutely disastrous – I cannot imagine and would be unwilling to survive the defeat of the British Empire. At the same time, I would view with dismay another defeat of Germany, which would merely serve the purposes of inferior races".

Shortly after arriving in Berlin, Henderson started to clash with Vansittart, who complained that Henderson was exceeding his brief and becoming too close to the Nazi leaders, especially Hermann Göring, who became Henderson's main diplomatic source as well as a personal acquaintance. Henderson first met Göring on 24 May 1937 and admitted to having a "real personal liking" for him. The same tendency towards hero worship that Henderson had displayed towards King Alexander in Belgrade reasserted itself in Berlin towards Göring, as Henderson had a fascination with militaristic authority figures. Göring shared Henderson's love of hunting and guns, and both frequently went away for hunting trips to discuss the future of Anglo-German relations. Eden sharply criticised Henderson for not challenging Göring's statement that the German people should not look upon Britain as "an enemy in their path" and that closer Anglo-German ties were needed, as the statement implied that current British foreign policy was anti-German. In one of his "calculated indiscretions", Henderson broke with the unwritten rule in the Foreign Office that ambassadors should never criticise their predecessors by telling Göring that Sir Eric Phipps had been too insensitive towards German concerns.

In June 1937, Canadian Prime Minister William Lyon Mackenzie King visited Berlin to meet Hitler. Mackenzie King told Henderson that Hitler had said that "they all liked him and felt he had a good understanding of German problems", a remark that appealed much to Henderson's vanity. Hitler called Henderson "the man with the carnation", in reference to the red carnation Henderson that always wore; and actually despised him: he found Henderson to be too superior in his manners for his liking. In contrast to his close friendship with Göring, Henderson's relationship with Foreign Minister Joachim von Ribbentrop was extremely antagonistic. Henderson detested Ribbentrop and wrote to King George VI that Ribbentrop was "eaten up with conceit". Henderson argued that the Nazi regime was divided into factions, which he called the "moderates" and the "extremists". Henderson regarded Göring as the leader of the "moderates", which also included the Wehrmacht officer corps, the Reichsbank officials, the professional diplomats of the Foreign Office and the officials of the Reich Ministry of Economy, and the "extremists" were Ribbentrop, Josef Goebbels and Heinrich Himmler. Henderson argued that Britain should work to revise the international system established by the Treaty of Versailles in favour of Germany, which would strengthen the "moderates" in Germany and weaken the "extremists", as the best way of preventing another world war. Henderson regarded all aims of the "moderates", such as the return of the Free City of Danzig, the Polish Corridor, Upper Silesia, the lost colonies in Africa, the Anschluss with Austria and the Sudetenland joining Germany as being reasonable and just. This was Henderson's greatest mistake during his Ambassadorship: he fundamentally misunderstood that Hitler himself was the most extreme, and therefore would not be susceptible to moderate advice.

When Henderson accepted Göring's invitation to attend the 1937 Nazi Party rally in Nuremberg without consulting the Foreign Office, Vansittart was furious and wrote that it was "extraordinary" that Henderson should "not only take an important decision like this off his own bat without giving us a chance at consultation ... but also announce it to a foreign colleague as a decision". Vansittart wrote to Henderson that he should not attend the Nuremberg Rally since "you would be suspected of giving countenance or indeed eulogy (as alleged by one Member of Parliament) to the Nazi system", and the Foreign Office would be accused of having "fascist leanings". Henderson wrote back that "one has to be empirical to a certain degree and since Nazism could not be wished away, what was the point of being discourteous to Hitler and unnecessarily irritating to him?"

Henderson's attendance at the rally was widely interpreted by the Nazis as granting his official approval of their ideology. At the same time, Henderson described the "Strength Through Joy" movement and the labour camps for young people as showing the "beneficial" aspects of Hitler's rule and ensured that the young Germans developed properly-patriotic attitudes towards the fatherland.

Henderson called the rally (10-11 September 1937) a most impressive event attended by some 140,000 Germans, who were full of enthusiasm for the regime. Henderson wrote that his hosts in Nuremberg went out of their way to be friendly towards him by giving him a luxurious apartment to stay in and inviting him to sumptuous meals with the best German food and wine being served. From Nuremberg, Henderson reported to London:

We are witnessing in Germany the rebirth, the reorganisation and unification of the German nation. One may criticise and disapprove, one may thoroughly dislike the threatened consummation and be apprehensive of its potentialities. But let us make no mistake. A machine is being built up in Germany, which in the course of this generation, if it succeeds unchecked, as there is no reason to believe that it will not, will be extraordinarily formidable. All this was achieved in less than five years. Germany is now so strong it can no longer be attacked with impunity, and soon, the country will be prepared for aggressive action.

However, Henderson saw no reason for alarm and wrote that "we are perhaps entering the quieter phrase of Nazism, of which the first indication has been the greater tranquility of the 1937 meeting [at Nuremberg]." Henderson spoke with Hitler at Nuremberg and described him as seeking "reasonableness" in foreign affairs with a special interest in reaching an "Anglo-German understanding". Because Hitler's speech at Nuremberg had demanded that Britain and France return the former German colonies in Africa, Henderson came away with the impression that for Hitler, the restoration of the German colonial empire in Africa was his principal foreign policy interest. The British historian Andrew Crozier wrote that the thesis of "colonial blackmail" developed by the German historian Klaus Hildebrand, namely that for Hitler the demands for lost colonies in Africa were meant to "blackmail" Britain into giving Germany a "free hand in the East", was well supported by the available evidence.

=== Sudeten issue ===
On 16 March 1938, Henderson wrote to the Foreign Secretary, Lord Halifax, to set out his view: "British interests and the standard of morality can only be combined if we insist upon the fullest possible equality for the Sudeten minority of Czechoslovakia". Unlike Basil Newton, the British minister in Prague, Henderson initially advocated plans to turn Czechoslovakia into a federation and wrote to Halifax "how to secure, if we can, the integrity of Czechoslovakia". At a meeting with Vojtech Mastny, the Czechoslovak minister in Berlin, on 30 March 1938, Henderson admitted that Czechoslovakia had the best record for the treatment of its minorities in Eastern Europe but criticised Czechoslovakia for being a unitary state, which he argued caused too many problems in a state made up of Czechs, Slovaks, Magyars, Germans, Poles and Ukrainians. Henderson told Mastny that he felt that becoming a "Federal State" was Czechoslovakia's best hope and wanted Czechoslovakia to reorientate its foreign policy upon "Prague–Berlin–Paris axis", instead of the existing "Prague–Paris–Moscow axis". In the spring of 1938, Henderson formed an alliance with Newton to work together to persuade decisionmakers in London to side with Germany against Czechoslovakia. When Henderson sent Newton a private letter praising him for his pro-German dispatches on 19 May 1938, the latter replied with a letter saying that he hoped Henderson would "be awarded the Nobel Peace Prize and when that is done, I hope I may receive honourable mention. You have much the hardest job".

During the May Crisis of 20–21 May 1938, Henderson was badly shaken by the partial Czechoslovak mobilisation, which, for Henderson, proved that President Edvard Beneš was dangerous and reckless. At the same time, Henderson formed alliances with Baron Ernst von Weizsäcker, the State Secretary of the Auswärtiges Amt; André François-Poncet, the French ambassador in Berlin; and Baron Bernardo Attolico, the Italian ambassador in Berlin, to work together to "manage" Germany's return to great power status peacefully. Acting independently of their own national governments, Weizsäcker, Attolico, Henderson and François-Poncet formed a common front: on the one hand, to sabotage the plans of Hitler and Ribbentrop to attack Czechoslovakia; and, on the other, to ensure that the Sudetenland, the ostensible object of the German-Czechoslovak dispute, was handed over to Germany. Attolico, Weizsäcker, Henderson and François-Poncet would meet in secret to discuss in French to share information and to devise strategies to stop a war in 1938. Weizsäcker and Henderson both wanted a peaceful "chemical dissolution of Czechoslovakia", instead of the "mechanical dissolution" of war, which was favoured by Hitler and Ribbentrop. During Henderson's time in Berlin, he was closer to Weizsäcker than to any other German official except Göring.

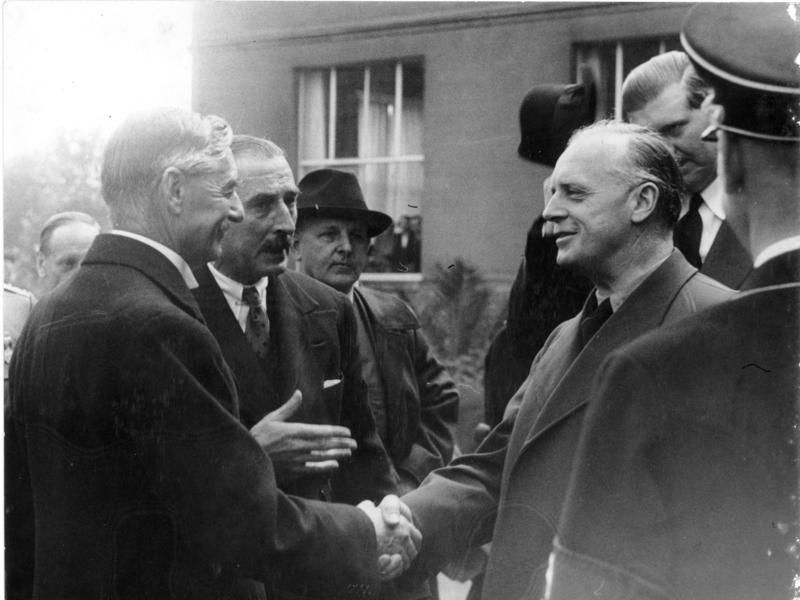
Henderson with Chamberlain and Ribbentrop at Hotel Petersberg, September 1938

Despite his earlier pro-Yugoslav views, Henderson started to display strong anti-Slavic views during his time in Berlin. He wrote writing to Lord Halifax on 22 August 1938, "The Teuton and the Slav are irreconcilable-just as are the Briton and the Slav. Mackenzie King told me last year after the Imperial Conference that the Slavs in Canada never assimilated with the people and never became good citizens". As the crisis over the Sudetenland region intensified in September 1938, Henderson became convinced that Britain should not fight a major war with Germany, which jeopardised the British Empire, over the Sudetenland, especially since he believed that it had been "unjust" in the first place for the Treaty of Versailles to have assigned the Sudetenland to Czechoslovakia. In September 1938, Henderson, along with Halifax and Sir Horace Wilson, the Chief Industrial Adviser to the government, were the only ones aware of Chamberlain's Plan Z to have the Prime Minister fly to Germany to meet Hitler personally and to find out just exactly it was that he wanted with the Sudetenland.

After Hitler gave his keynote speech at the 1938 Nuremberg Party Rally on 12 September 1938 demanding Beneš to allow the Sudetenland to join Germany or Czechoslovakia to be invaded, Henderson who had attended the rally, reported to London that Hitler "driven by the megalomania inspired by the military force which he has built up ... he may have crossed the borderline into insanity". In the same dispatch, Henderson wrote he could not speak with "certitude" over what Germany might do as "everything depends on the psychology of one abnormal individual". Henderson spoke with Hitler after he gave his speech at the rally and reported that Hitler "even while addressing the Hitler Youth" was so nervous that he could not relax, which led to Henderson to conclude, "His abnormality seemed to me even greater than ever". Despite Henderson's belief that Hitler might have actually gone mad, he still found much to admire about him and wrote that he had "sublime faith in his own mission and that of Germany in the world" and "he is a constructive genius, a builder and no mere demagogue". Henderson did not believe that Hitler wanted all of Czechoslovakia and wrote to Halifax that all that Hitler wanted was to secure "fair and honorable treatment for the Austro- and Sudeten Germans", even at the price of war, but Hitler "hates war as much as anyone".

Henderson was ambassador at the time of the 1938 Munich Agreement and counselled Chamberlain to agree to it. Shortly thereafter, he returned to London for medical treatment, returning to Berlin in ill health in February 1939 (he would die of cancer less than four years later). Sir Oliver Harvey, Halifax's Principal Private Secretary, wrote in September 1938, "Nevile Henderson's very presence here is a danger as he infects the Cabinet with his gibber".

=== Czechoslovakia ===
In October 1938, Henderson was diagnosed with cancer, which caused him to leave for London. From October 1938 to February 1939, the British Embassy in Berlin was run by the chargé d'affaires, Sir George Ogilvie-Forbes, a member of the Scottish gentry and a protégé of Vansittart. The dispatches from Berlin changed markedly as Ogilvie-Forbes stated his belief that Hitler's aims went beyond revising the Treaty of Versailles towards winning Germany "world power status". Ogilvie-Forbes wrote to London 6 December 1938 that based on the information he received, he believed that Hitler would start a war sometime in 1939 with Hitler divided only about whether it would be in Western Europe or in Eastern Europe. Unlike Henderson, who tended to gloss over the sufferings of German Jews, Ogilvie-Forbes gave far more attention to Nazi anti-Semitism. Ascher, himself a German Jew, noted in Ogilvie-Forbes's dispatches to London that there was a real sense of personal empathy with the sufferings of German Jews, which Henderson never displayed. After Hitler gave his "Prophecy Speech" to the Reichstag on 30 January 1939, Ogilvie-Forbes predicted that the "extermination" of Jews in Germany "can only be a matter of time". Henderson, by contrast, wrote that "Jews and Communists" were the principal "warmongers"; British Jews caused Germanophobia in Britain; Jews around the world would "move heaven and earth" to cause an Anglo-German war and "Jews, Communists and the intelligentsia" were the chief troublemakers in the world. To counter the negative reaction caused in Britain by the Kristallnacht pogrom, Henderson during his stay in London suggested to Herbert von Dirksen, the German ambassador to the Court of St James's that the persecution of German Jews be "regularized in an orderly and systematic manner" so as to reduce the offence given to British public opinion.

When Henderson returned to Berlin on 13 February 1939, his first action was to call a meeting of the senior staff of the British embassy, where he castigated Ogilvie-Forbes for his negative tone in his dispatches during his absence and announced that all dispatches to London would have to conform to his views, and that any diplomat who reported otherwise would be removed from the Foreign Office. On 18 February 1939, Henderson reported to London: "Herr Hitler does not contemplate any adventures at the moment ... all stories and rumours to the contrary are completely without foundation". In February 1939, Henderson cabled the Foreign Office in London:

If we handle him (Hitler) right, my belief is that he will become gradually more pacific. But if we treat him as a pariah or mad dog we shall turn him finally and irrevocably into one.

On 6 March 1939, Henderson sent a lengthy dispatch to Lord Halifax that attacked almost everything that Ogilvie-Forbes had written while he was in charge of the British embassy. Besides disallowing Ogilvie-Forbes, Henderson also attacked British newspapers for negative coverage of Nazi Germany, especially the Kristallnacht, and demanded that the Chamberlain government impose censorship to end all negative coverage of the Third Reich. Henderson wrote: "If a free press is allowed to run riot without guidance from higher authority, the damage which it may do is unlimited. Even war may be one of its consequences". Henderson praised Hitler for his "sentimentality" and wrote "the humiliation of the Czechs [at the Munich conference] was a tragedy", but it was Beneš's own fault for failing to give autonomy to the Sudeten Germans while he still had the chance. Henderson called Kristallnacht a "disgusting exhibition", which was, however, "comprehensible within limits. The German authorities were undoubtedly seriously alarmed lest another Jew, emboldened by the success of Grynszpan should follow his example and murder either Hitler or one of themselves".

After Wehrmacht troops on 15 to 16 March 1939 occupied the remaining territory of Czechoslovakia in defiance of the Munich Agreement, Chamberlain spoke of a betrayal of confidence and decided to resist German aggression. Henderson handed over a protest note and was intermittently recalled to London. Henderson wrote, "Nazism has crossed the Rubicon of the purity of race" by creating the Protectorate of Bohemia-Moravia and that the seizure of the "Czech lands" of Bohemia and Moravia "cannot be justified on any grounds". By late March 1939, there was a feeling in the cabinet that Henderson could no longer effectively represent Britain in Berlin, but Henderson was kept on for the want of a suitable "grand embassy" to send him to as a replacement. There was talk of sending Henderson to Washington, but there were objections that Henderson's tendency to commit "calculated indiscretions" would not mix well with the American press, which was inclined to report any indiscretions by public figures, whether they were calculated or not. The US State Department made it clear to the Foreign Office that it felt that Henderson would be an embarrassment in Washington. When Henderson asked for leave to visit Canada in the spring of 1939, he was told that he would have to give to the Foreign Office copies of any planned lectures before he gave them since no-one in the Chamberlain government still trusted Henderson to "speak sensibly" about Germany.

On 29 April 1939, the French ambassador in Berlin, Robert Coulondre, reported to Paris that when Germany occupied the Czech half of Czecho-Slovakia on 15 March 1939, that Henderson, "always an admirer of the National Socialist regime, careful to protect Mr. Hitler's prestige, was convinced that Great Britain and Germany could divide the world between them" but was very angry when he learned that the Reich had just violated the Munich Agreement, as it "wounded him in his pride". Coulondre went on to write: "Yesterday, I found him exactly as I knew him in February". Coulondre added that Henderson had told him that the German demand for the Free City of Danzig to be allowed to rejoin Germany was justified in his view and that the introduction of conscription in Britain did not mean that British policies towards Germany were changing. Coulondre concluded that "it appears that events barely touched Sir Nevile Henderson, like water over a mirror.... It would seem that he forgot everything and failed to learn anything". Henderson's relations with Coulondre were unfriendly and cold as the latter distrusted both Henderson and Weizsäcker, and unlike François-Poncet, Coulondre refused to join the "group of four" that had met in 1938 to stop a war. By early May 1939, Henderson reported to London that Hitler still wanted good relations with Britain but only if it ended "the policy of encirclement". Henderson also added that he believed in the "justice" of Hitler's demand for the Free City of Danzig to return to Germany and wrote that Danzig was "practically a wholly German city" and that Hitler did not want a war with Poland, but one might break out "if his offer to Poland was uncompromisingly rejected".

=== Prelude to war ===
During the Danzig Crisis, Henderson consistently took the line that Germany was justified in demanding the return of the Free City of Danzig and that the onus was on the Poles to make concessions to Germany by allowing it to "go home to the Reich". Henderson wrote to Halifax about Danzig and the Polish Corridor: "Can we allow the Polish government to be too uncompromising with them?" Henderson felt that the Versailles Treaty had been unjust towards Germany by creating the Free City of Danzig and giving the Polish Corridor and part of Silesia to Poland, and his preferred solution to the crisis would be Britain to pressure the Poles into concessions. However, Henderson also believed that Britain needed to deter Germany from attacking Poland while Britain pressured Poland into concessions and so favoured the "peace front" with the Soviet Union, despite his distrust, as the best form of deterrence.

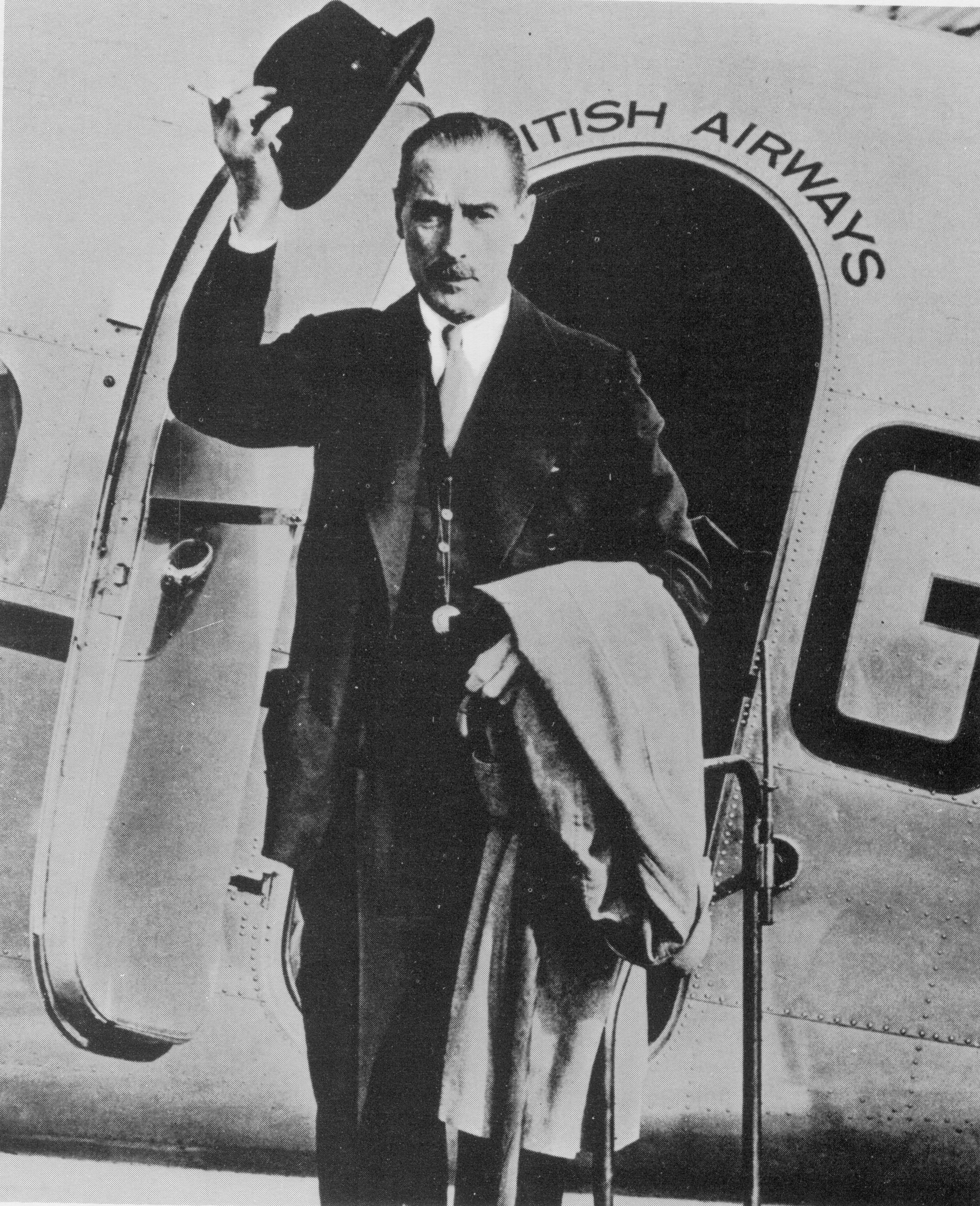
Henderson leaves for Berlin, Croydon Airport, August 1939

On the eve of the Second World War, Henderson came into frequent conflict with Sir Alexander Cadogan, Permanent Under-Secretary of State for Foreign Affairs. Henderson argued that Britain should rearm secretly, as public rearming would encourage the belief that Britain planned to go to war against Germany. Cadogan and the Foreign Office disagreed with Henderson.

The signing of the Molotov–Ribbentrop Pact on 23 August 1939 and the Anglo-Polish military alliance two days later made war imminent. On the night of 30 August, Henderson had an extremely tense meeting with Ribbentrop. Ribbentrop presented the German "final offer" to Poland at midnight and warned Henderson that if he received no reply by dawn, the "final offer" would be considered to have been rejected. The American historian Gerhard Weinberg described the scene: "When Ribbentrop refused to give a copy of the German demands to the British Ambassador at midnight of 30–31 August 1939, the two almost came to blows. Ambassador Henderson, who had long advocated concessions to Germany, recognised that here was a deliberately conceived alibi the German government had prepared for a war it was determined to start. No wonder Henderson was angry; von Ribbentrop on the other hand could see war ahead and went home beaming".

While negotiating with Polish Ambassador Józef Lipski and advising accommodation over Germany's territorial ambitions, as he had during the Anschluss with Austria and the occupation of Czechoslovakia, Germany staged the Gleiwitz incident, and the invasion of Poland began on 1 September. Henderson had to deliver Britain's final ultimatum on the morning of 3 September 1939 to Ribbentrop that if hostilities between Germany and Poland did not cease by 11 a.m. that day, a state of war would exist between Britain and Germany. Germany did not respond and so Chamberlain declared war at 11:15 a.m. Henderson and his staff were briefly interned by the Gestapo before they returned to Britain on 7 September.

== Later life ==
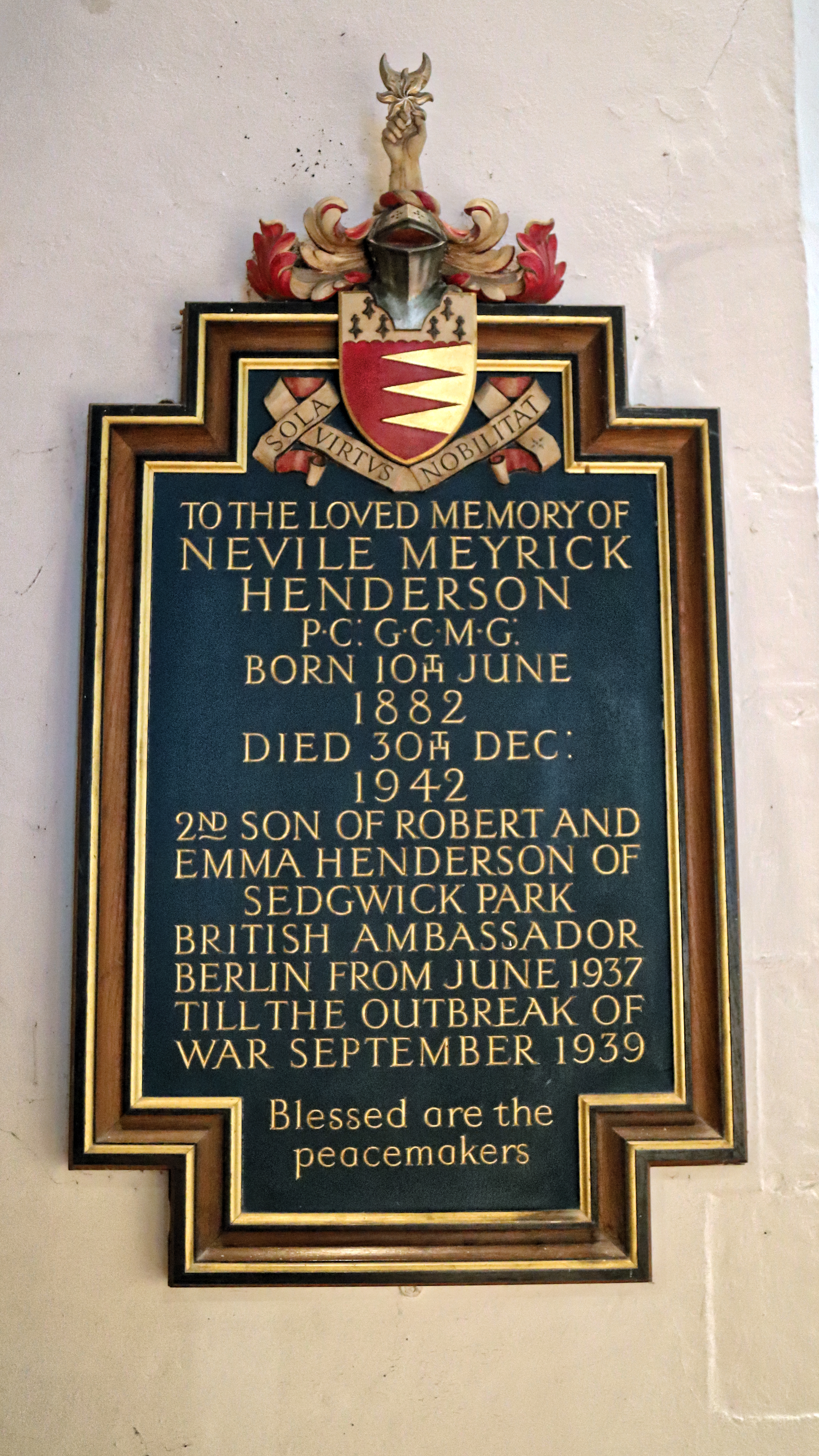
Henderson's memorial in St Andrew's Church, Nuthurst, West Sussex

After he had returned to London, Henderson asked for another ambassadorship, but was denied. He wrote Failure of a Mission: Berlin 1937–1939, which was published in 1940, while staying at South Rauceby Hall, the home of an aunt in Lincolnshire. He spoke highly of some members of the Nazi regime, including Reichsmarschall Hermann Göring but not Ribbentrop. He had been on friendly terms with members of the Astors' Cliveden set, which also supported appeasement. Henderson wrote in his memoirs how eager Prince Paul of Yugoslavia had been to illustrate his military plans to counter Mussolini's projected assault on Dalmatia when the main body of the Italian Royal Army had been sent overseas. The historian A. L. Rowse described Failure of a Mission as "an appalling revelation of fatuity in high place".

In his memoir, Henderson stated:

Atatürk (Mustafa Kemal) built a new Turkey on the ruins of the old; and his expulsion of the Greeks, which perhaps suggested to Hitler that he should do the same in Germany with the Jews, has already been forgotten and forgiven.

This has been compared to Hitler's Armenian reference, an alleged quote in which Hitler states "Who, after all, speaks today of the annihilation of the Armenians?"

== Death ==
Henderson died on 30 December 1942 of cancer. He was then staying at the Dorchester Hotel, in London. Informed by his doctors that he had around six months left to live, he wrote an anecdote-filled diplomatic memoir, Water Under the Bridges, which was posthumously published in 1945. Its final chapter defends his work in Berlin and the policy of "appeasement," praises Chamberlain for being "an honest and brave man" and argues on behalf of the Munich Agreement on the grounds that Britain was too weak militarily in 1938 to have stood up to Hitler. It also asserts that if Germany had invaded Czechoslovakia, the latter would have fallen within a few months.

Diplomatic posts
Preceded by Howard William Kennard	Envoy Extraordinary and Minister Plenipotentiary to the Kingdom of Yugoslavia; 1929–1935	Succeeded by Ronald Ian Campbell
Preceded by Eric Phipps	Extraordinary and Plenipotentiary Ambassador to the Third Reich; 1937–1939	Succeeded by No representation until 1950; Ivone Kirkpatrick
