= Haremere Hall =

Country house in East Sussex, England

Coordinates: 51°00′46″N 0°27′14″E

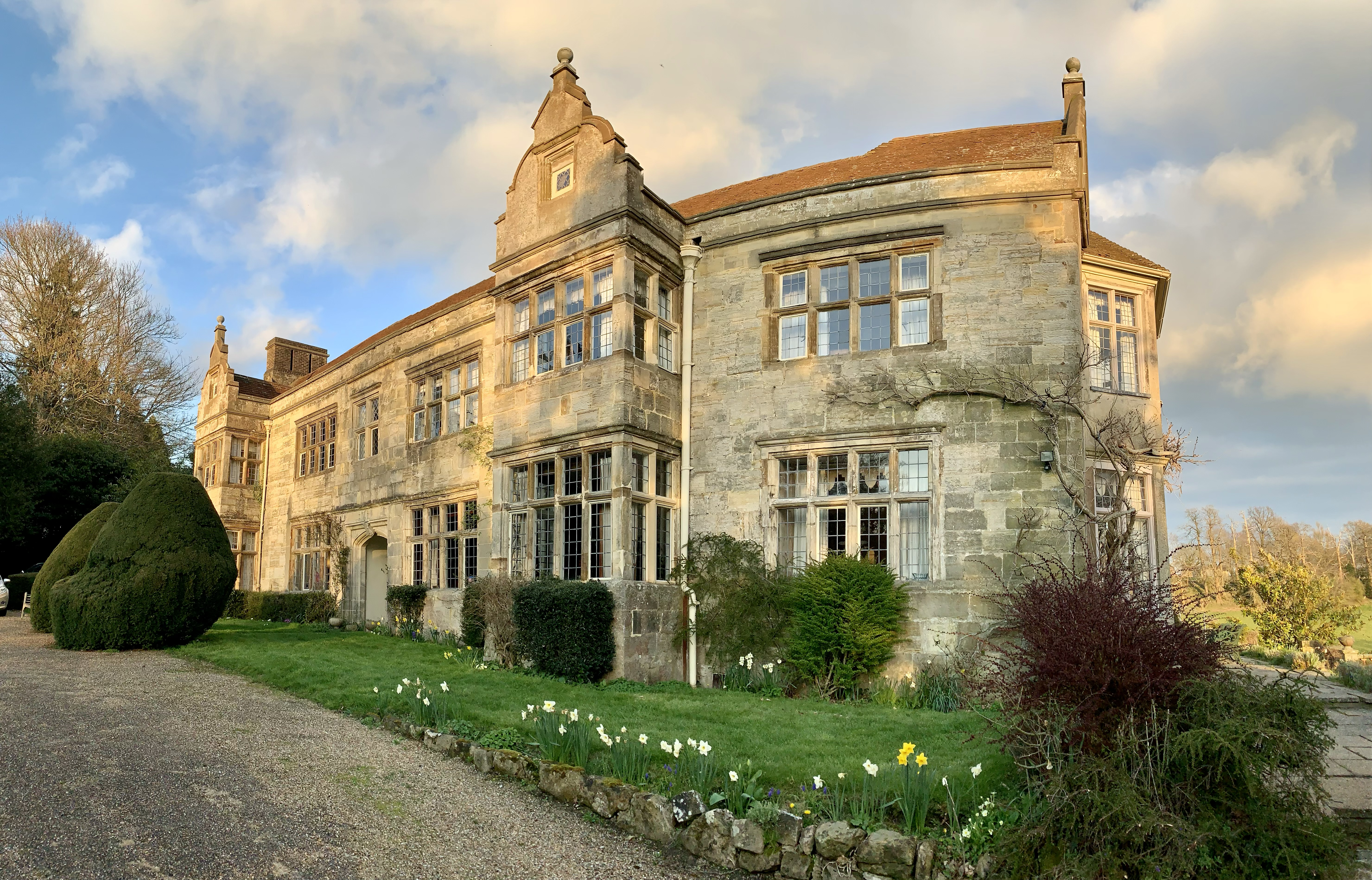
West face of Haremere Hall

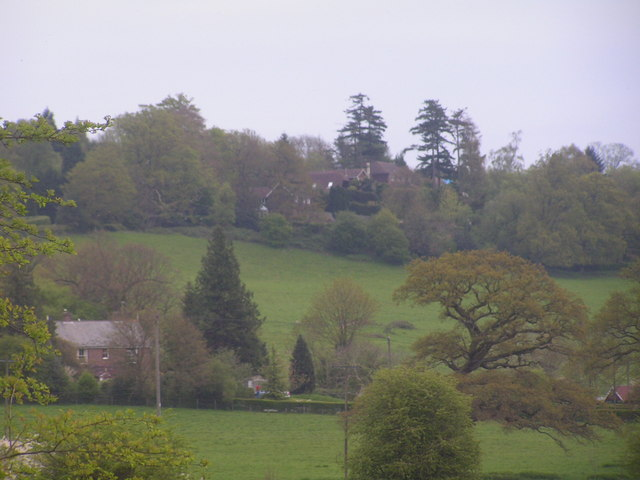
View of the hall in the background, from its grounds

Haremere Hall is a Grade I listed Jacobean building near Etchingham, East Sussex.

== Location ==
The hall is approximately 11,000-square-foot (1,000 m^{2}) in size and sited in an 84-acre (34 ha) grounds. It is around 12 miles north of Hastings and the grounds overlook the River Rother.

== History ==
There has been a dwelling on the site of what is now Haremere Hall since the 12th century. The current building dates from the early 1600s. James Temple, one of the judges at the trial and subsequent execution of King Charles I, resided in the hall in the 1620s. By the end of the century, it had been occupied by the Busbridge family, relations of the Temples by marriage.

John Lade, friend of the Prince Regent regularly visited the hall in the 19th century. The hall was purchased by Miles Lampson, 1st Baron Killearn in 1957. Following his death, it was the home of his widow Jacqueline, the dowager Lady Killearn.

The house became Grade I listed in 1961. In 2011, aged 102, the dowager Lady Killearn attempted to put the property on the market for around £1.65 million but was prevented from doing so by her son, Victor.
