= Ronald Ian Campbell =

British diplomat (1890–1983)

Campbell in 1946.

Sir Ronald Ian Campbell GCMG CB PC (7 June 1890 – 22 April 1983) was a British diplomat.

Campbell was the second son of Sir Guy Campbell, 3rd Baronet (see Campbell baronets), and Nina, daughter of Frederick Lehmann. He was educated at Eton and graduated from Magdalen College, Oxford, in 1912 with a Bachelor of Arts. In 1939, Campbell was appointed Envoy Extraordinary and Minister Plenipotentiary to the Kingdom of Yugoslavia, a post he held until 1941 when he became Envoy Extraordinary and Minister Plenipotentiary (deputy head of mission) at Washington, D.C., until 1944. He became Assistant Under-Secretary of State at the Foreign Office in 1945, and served as the United Kingdom's ambassador to Egypt from 1946 to 1950. He was invested as a Privy Counsellor in 1950.

Diplomatic posts
| Preceded by Sir Ronald H. Campbell | Envoy Extraordinary and Minister Plenipotentiary to His Majesty the King of Yugoslavia; 1939–1941 | Succeeded by Sir George Rendel |
| Preceded by Sir Miles Lampson | Ambassador Extraordinary and Plenipotentiary at Cairo; 1946–1950 | Succeeded by Sir Ralph Stevenson |
