= Miles Lampson, 1st Baron Killearn =

British diplomat (1880–1964)

The Right Honourable The Lord Killearn GCMG CB MVO PC
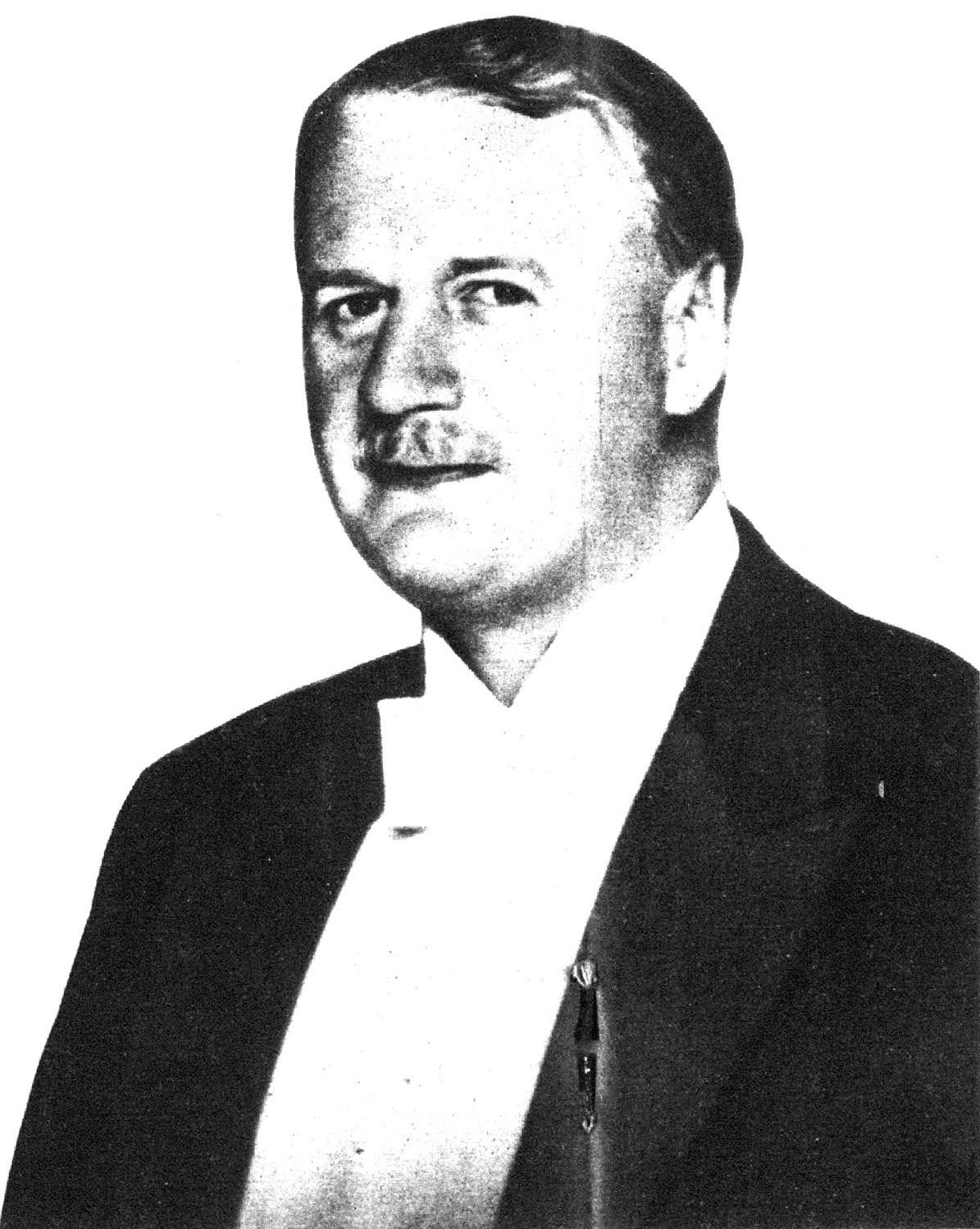

His Britannic Majesty's Ambassador to Egypt and the Sudan
- In office 1936–1946
- Preceded by: Himself (as UK High Commissioner)
- Succeeded by: Sir Ronald Ian Campbell

His Britannic Majesty's High Commissioner to Egypt and the Sudan
- In office 1934–1936
- Preceded by: Sir Percy Loraine
- Succeeded by: Himself (as UK Ambassador)

Personal details
- Born: Miles Wedderburn Lampson; 24 August 1880
- Died: 18 September 1964 (aged 84)

Miles Wedderburn Lampson, 1st Baron Killearn, GCMG, CB, MVO, PC (24 August 1880 – 18 September 1964) was a British diplomat.

== Background and education ==
Miles Lampson was the son of Norman Lampson, and grandson of Sir Curtis Lampson, 1st Baronet. His mother was Helen, daughter of Peter Blackburn, MP for Stirlingshire. He was educated at Eton. Lampson had grown up in the late Victorian era and tended to ascribe to the views of his times that non-white peoples were "inferior races" who needed to be ruled by the British for their own good, which influenced his attitudes during his service in China and Egypt. Lampson's great burning ambition was to be the Viceroy of India, and during his career as a diplomat in China and Egypt he often acted as if he was auditioning to be the next Viceroy of India.

== Diplomatic career ==
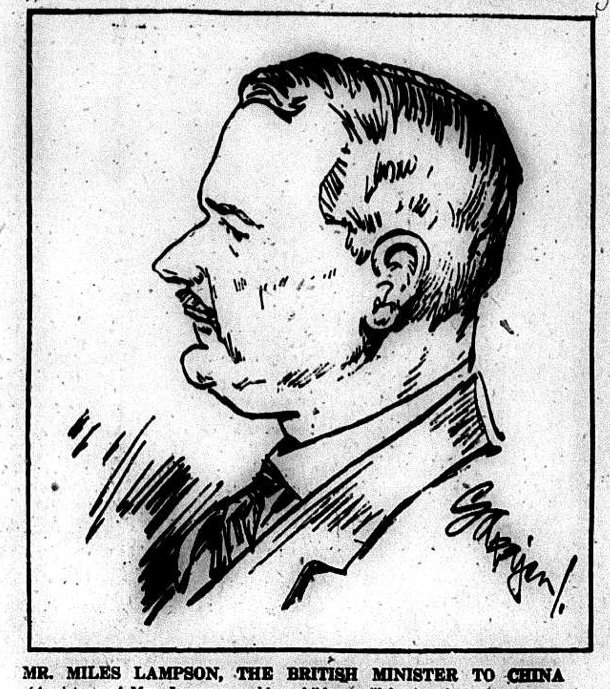
Miles Lampson, British Minister to China by Sapajou (1926)

Lampson entered the Foreign Office in 1903. He served as Secretary to Garter Mission, Japan, in 1906, as 2nd Secretary at Tokyo, Japan, between 1908 and 1910, as 2nd Secretary at Sofia, Bulgaria in 1911, as 1st Secretary at Peking in 1916, as Acting British High Commissioner in Siberia in 1920 and as British Minister to China between 1926 and 1933. While in Tokyo, Lampson served alongside Sir Nevile Henderson, with whom he corresponded until Henderson's death in 1942.

== The Central Office ==
In 1920, the Imperial Japanese Army staged the Gando Massacre killing 5,000 ethnic Korean civilians in the town of Gando (modern Jiandao) the Manchuria region of China, most of whom were Christian converts along with assaulting a number of Canadian Presbyterian missionaries who had been tending to the Korean converts. In turn, there were numerous complaints in Canada that the Foreign Office was doing too little to protect Canadian missionaries in Manchuria. In July 1921, the Canadian diplomat Loring Christie met with Lampson in London to discuss the issue, and where Lampson promised that the Foreign Office was doing upmost to raise the issue with the Japanese government and to protect Canadian missionaries. Lampson admitted that the massive media attention the Gando massacre had received in Canada owning to the mistreatment of the Canadian missionaries had "made a considerable stir in Canada". The issue was sensitive as the allegations that the Foreign Office was indifferent to the plaint of the missionaries had led to the demands that Canada have its own diplomatic service, which the Foreign Office was strongly opposed to. Christie came away from his interview with Lampson with the feeling that the Foreign Office was trying strenuously to protect the missionaries and for moment Canada dropped the demand for its own diplomatic corps.

A protégé of the Foreign Secretary Austen Chamberlain, Lampson held a series of high posts in the Foreign Office in the 1920s. Lampson served as the chief of the Central Department of the Foreign Office, which had the responsibility of dealing with western Europe. Lampson took part in the Locarno conference in October 1925, attending alongside Chamberlain, the German Foreign Minister Gustav Stresemann, the German Chancellor Hans Luther and the French Foreign Minister Aristide Briand. Lampson wrote in his diary: "Briand, Stresemann, and Luther sit opposite to another in the Conference room and discuss with the utmost discretion and good humor their various difficulties. Each goes out of his way to show he realises those of the other...I was trilled to the bone once or twice by the eloquence and obvious sincerity of both Briand and Stresemann". In common with Chamberlain, Lampson believed that the Locarno conference marked the beginning of a new era in Franco-German relations which he believed would end forever the possibility of another world war.

Lampson strongly supported Chamberlain's policy of seeking better relations with Germany and supporting Germany peacefully taking back the lands lost to Poland under the Treaty of Versailles. As such, Lampson turned down repeated Polish requests for a British guarantee of the current German-Polish border, saying that Britain had no interest in maintaining these borders. In the 1920s, the country British decision-makers feared the most was the Soviet Union, which was committed to exporting its Communist revolution to the rest of the world. As part of its efforts to promote chaos and Communism, the Soviets supported any state that sought to challenge the international order such as Germany in Europe, Turkey in the Middle East and China in Asia. In 1922, Germany and Soviet Russia had signed the Treaty of Rapallo, and the fear of a German-Soviet bloc served as the major impetus for Chamberlain's support of revising the Treaty of Versailles in Germany's favor. Likewise, Lampson had a very favorable view of the Anglophile Hungarian prime minister István Bethlen, whom he believed to be the best man to govern Hungary. In 1926, the reputation of Hungary had been badly damaged by the Franc affair when Hungarian officials had conspired to circulate thousands of forged French francs in a bid to wreck the French economy. Lampson wrote in response: "As we all know many Hungarians are not quite normal when it is a question of recovering Hungary's lost dominions or of re-establishing the Crown, but I repeat that I refuse to believe that either Bethlen or any other responsible Hungarian (I of course include Horthy) can have anything whatever to do with this madness".

Lampson was very close to Sir Eric Phipps, the First Secretary at the British Embassy in Paris, whom he wrote to on a daily basis. Like almost everyone else in interwar Britain, Lampson believed that the Treaty of Versailles was far too harsh on Germany and he supported German demands for a revision of the treaty. Alongside his opposition to the Treaty of Versailles, Lampson believed that France was the greatest danger to world peace and felt that a stronger Germany was needed to check French power. In common with everyone else at the Foreign Office, Lampson accepted that Eastern Europe should be in Germany's sphere of influence and felt that the French alliance system in Eastern Europe was highly dangerous to the peace of the world.. France had signed alliances with Poland in 1921, Czechoslovakia in 1924, Romania in 1926 and Yugoslavia in 1927. Lampson would had much preferred that the French abrogate their alliances in Eastern Europe and supported the Locarno Treaties as the first step towards ending the French alliance system. The British historian Robert Boyce wrote that the Phipps-Lampson letters from the 1920s "captures the mixture of impatience, scorn and racism which British diplomats regarded their Gallic neighbors". In a typical letter to Phipps, sent in May 1926, Lampson wrote: "Are the French mad? If they delay German entry into the League of Nations, they risk losing Locarno. Do they realise if they lose Locarno, they will have lost almost certainly for all time all chance of a guarantee from us". Phipps wrote back: "I do not think that the French are mad, but they are very feminine", leading Lampson to reply that being feminine and being insane were "almost identical".

Lampson, Phipps, Chamberlain and almost everyone else at the Foreign Office tended to dismiss French fears of German power as "hysteria" and in revealing gendered language as "feminine". Boyce wrote that Lampson and the other British decision-makers of the 1920s vastly exaggerated French power along with the supposed severity of the Treaty of Versailles, and seemed incapable of understanding that the long-term power balance was in favor of the Reich, which still held "a formidable war-making potential" in the form of the world's second largest economy along with having three powers the population of France. Likewise, Boyce noted that British decision-makers did not understand that the vast majority of the German people sincerely believed in the Dolchstoßlegende ("stab-in-the-back-legend:), which held that Germany actually won World War One in 1918 and was only "stabbed in the back" at the moment of victory by the Jews. The logical corollary of the Dolchstoßlegende was that Germany should start another world war, which it would win provided that proper measures were taken to stop the Jews from doing another "stab in the back". Boyce wrote that the French fears of Germany were "essentially sound" given that most Germans wanted to start another world war and were prevented from doing so by the checks imposed on the Reich by the Treaty of Versailles, but once those checks were removed, it was inevitable that another world war would come. By contrast, British decision-makers were very dismissive of French fears, ignored the implications of the Dolchstoßlegende, and tended to feel that if only the Treaty of Versailles were revised, there would be no danger of another world war.

== Minister-plenipotentiary to China ==
In October 1926, Lampson was sent out as the British minister-plenipotentiary to China. At a time of very troubled Anglo-Chinese relations, the Foreign Secretary Austen Chamberlain had personally selected his friend Lampson as the best time to handle relations with China. On 30 May 1925, the Shanghai Municipal Police had opened fire on demonstrators, which sparked the May Thirtieth Movement calling for the end of all the special rights held by foreign powers in China. Chamberlain privately admitted that because of its sheer size and population that a war against China was impossible, all the more so because of the Ten Year Rule which governed British defense spending since 1919, namely it was to be assumed that there would be no major war within the next ten years. Given this situation, Chamberlain wanted a British minister-plenipotentiary to China who would be forceful in upholding British interests within China without being so belligerent as to cause a war that Britain could not hope to fight. Chamberlain called Lampson "my right-hand man" and argued that given the gravity of the crisis in Anglo-Chinese relations that he was the best man to represent Britain in China. The previous minister-plenipotentiary, Sir Ronald Macleay, had strongly supported the claim of the warlord Zhang Zuolin, the "Old Marshal" who ruled Manchuria, to be China's leader. However, Zhang had been defeated by the Soviet-trained National Revolutionary Army of the Kuomintang during the Great Northern Expedition, which led Chamberlain to conclude that Macleay could not longer effectively represent Britain in China. Chamberlain and Lampson both hoped that British recognition of the Kuomintang government might strengthen the right-wing of the Kuomintang against the left-wing of the Kuomintang, and pull the new regime away from its alliance with the Chinese Communists and the Soviet Union. In December 1926, Chamberlain issued the "December Memorandum", offering to negotiate the end of the 19th century "unequal treaties", a move that Lampson supported as a way of undercutting the radical elements in the Kuomintang who favored the immediate abrogation of the "unequal treaties". In January 1927, Lampson refused a request from Zhang for British financial support, stating that Britain had no interest in backing the losing side.

Lampson had a low opinion of the Great Northern Expedition of 1926–1927, which saw a joint Kuomintang-Communist force marched north from Canton to defeat several coalitions of warlords before the Communists and the Kuomintang fell out after their victories and start fighting each other in a civil war that was to last on and off until 1949. About the Great Northern Expedition, Lampson wrote in a report to London: "the victories of the southern armies over their northern opponents were as much due to bribery, extortion, and other typical forms of Chinese corruption as to any real form of military superiority". Lampson personally disliked Chiang Kai-shek, but found him preferable to Mao Zedong. Initially, Lampson expressed much distrust of Chiang out of the account of his alliance with the Communists and that several Soviet officials such as Mikhail Borodin and Vasily Blyukher held prominent roles in his regime. After the outbreak of the civil war between the Communists and the Kuomintang, Lampson admitted that Chiang's newly founded sense of anti-Communism seemed sincere and that a China ruled by the Kuomintang was preferable to one ruled by the Communist. On 21 July 1927, Lampson attended a reception in Beijing where all of the minister-plenipotentiaries greeted Chiang Kai-shek, which marked the beginning of international recognition of the new regime in China. Immediately after the dinner, Chiang announced that Beijing was no longer China's capital and he was moving the capital south to Nanjing. As such, all of the foreign legations along with the attached diplomatic staffs were forced to follow Chiang south to the new capital.

Shortly afterwards, Lampson hosted a dinner for Chiang, which given that China and Britain had close to war several times was seen as a sign of improved relations. An Anglo-Chinese agreement was soon reached where in exchange for diplomatic recognition, Chiang apologised for the Nanking Incident (through in his apology he blamed the Chinese Communists for the violence and merely limited his responsibility for a failure of his forces to keep order) and agreed to pay compensation to the families of the British subjects killed in Nanjing. Starting with a Sino-American agreement in 1927, the new government signed a series of treaties that won back China tariff autonomy, allowing China the power to set its own tariffs. The only nation that refused to give China tariff autonomy was Japan, which let Chiang to mark sharply that the Europeans and the Americans were most reasonable on the questions of tariffs than his fellow Asians. During his time in China, Lampson worked closely with Nelson T. Johnson, the American minister-plenipotentiary, in creating a joint front. Johnson later recalled: "The evidence of cooperation between the two countries which we able to present was very gratifying to us, for we are both committed to the feeling that the United States and Great Britain can and should be together in the work of stabilizing world conditions....So far as Great Britain's representative in China was concerned, he and I worked together very intimately and closely throughout all this difficulty...There is in England a body of conservative opinion which has and still regrets the end of the Anglo-Japanese alliance. There is no doubt in my mind that the British government had to carry water between that camp and the other camp which had been playing the game with us". Chiang Kai-shek did not speak any language other than his native Mandarin, but his third wife, the American-educated Soong Mei-ling spoke fluent English. She attempted to teach her husband English, but the lessons stopped after Chiang greeted Lampson one morning. Instead of saying 'good morning Lampson", Chiang greeted Lampson by saying "kiss me Lampson" much to Lampson's amusement. After that incident, Chiang stopped trying to speak English and let Soong serve as his translator. In 1929, the warlord Zhang Xueliang, the "Young Marshal" who ruled Manchuria was badly defeated in a border war with the Soviet Union after he attempted to take over the Soviet-owned Chinese Eastern Railroad. Lampson gave the Chinese a note commenting that the Sino-Soviet border war saying "the experience of the Russians in Manchuria was a grave warning of the disastrous result of the hasty abolition of extraterritoriality before adequate arrangements had been thought out for meeting the situation." In a dispatch to London, Lampson wrote "on this occasion, the Far Eastern public was presented with the singular spectacle of an armed action by the Union of Soviet Socialist Republics which were held up by the 'imperialist" press of the Treaty Ports as an example of how to deal with the Chinese"."

On 13 May 1930, Lampson met with the British writer, journalist and adventurer Bertram Lenox Simpson to ask him not go through with his plans to seize the Customs House in Tianjin. At the time, China was in the middle of a civil war with a coalition of northern warlords led by General Feng Yuxiang, the "Christian General" and General Yan Xishan, the "Model Governor" having risen in rebellion against Generalissimo Chiang Kai-shek. Lampson personally sympathised with the northern coalition of warlords, writing in a report to London that both Feng and Yan were more "reasonable" than Chiang. On a more cynical note, Lampson was adamantly against ending the treaty ports or any of the other special British rights in China, which led to difficult relations with the Kuomintang regime, which had wanted the end of all the special rights held by foreign powers in China. As long as China did not have a government as was the case when the country collapsed into anarchy in 1916 following the death of President Yuan Shikai with various warlords fighting each other for supremacy, it could be argued that there was no Chinese government for Britain to negotiate with about ending the extraterritorial rights. After the Great Northern Expedition, the Kuomintang had established control over much of China and was internationally recognised as the government of China. As Lampson noted at the time, if the northern coalition could defeat the Kuomintang regime, it was probable that the victorious warlords would turn on each other as the warlords and China would follow into anarchy, which would thereby mean there was no Chinese government to negotiate about ending the British special rights in China. Chinese warlord politics were extremely treacherous and whenever one coalition of warlords defeated another, almost invariably the victors would follow out and start fighting each other. The Dutch historian Hans van de Ven noted that many aspects of British diplomacy during the Tianjin crisis seemed to favor the northern coalition as Lionel Giles, the British consul in Tianjin, arranged for meetings between Colonel Hayley Bell, the Customs Commissioner and General Yan's agent Su Tiren. However, Lampson wrote that"it is most undesirable that a British subject should thus thrust himself or be thrust into the forefront of this affair, especially a man of the type of Simpson". On 16 June 1930, Simpson seized the control of the Customs House in Tianjin on behalf of General Yan and appointed himself the Chief Customs Commissioner of Tianjin. Sir Frederick Maze, the Inspector-General of the Chinese Maritime Customs Service, met with Lampson to ask for help in removing Simpson whose actions had caused a major crisis. Lampson was notably unwilling to do anything to help Maze, writing in his diary that he felt the crisis to be most "amusing" and took a sadistic pleasure at Maze's predicament in being trapped between Simpson serving as a rogue Chief Customs Commissioner vs. Chiang's demand that Simpson be removed at once.

Lampson welcomed the Mukden incident of 18 September 1931 which saw the Japanese Kwantung Army start the conquest of Manchuria. Under the terms of the Treaty of Portsmouth in 1905, which had ended the Russian-Japanese war, Japan had been given various special rights in Manchuria, most notably the right to station the Kwantung Army in southern Manchuria. The Kwantung Army blew up a stretch of the railroad that belonged to the Japanese-owned South Manchurian Railroad Company early on the morning of 18 September, which the Kwantung Army immediately blamed on the warlord Zhang Xueliang, the "Young Marshal" who ruled Manchuria. The incident was promptly used as a pretext for the Kwantung Army to start a general offensive against Zhang's forces later the same day. Lampson complained the Kuomintang efforts to end the British special rights had reached "the high mark in the summer of 1931", but the "fortuitous intervention of other events" as he called the invasion of Manchuria had put an end to the campaign. Lampson wrote that Japan's invasion and occupation of Manchuria gave Britain "a breathing space" as the war in Manchuria eclipsed everything else as there was massive outrage all over China at Japan's actions . In the aftermath of the conquest of Manchuria, the Chinese delegation at the League of Nations accused Japan of aggression under the grounds there was no evidence that Chinese forces had blown up the railroad tracks belong to the South Manchurian Railroad Company and even if they had, the Japanese reaction was wildly disproportionate to the alleged Chinese offense. In response, the League of Nations had appointed the Lytton Commission to examine the facts of the matter. The Lytton Commission was largely the work of the Foreign Secretary Sir John Simon, who was desperate to find some reason to not take action against Japan and he informed the commission's chairman, Lord Lytton to take his time with his work and to try to find some evidence that might support Japanese claims that the invasion of Manchuria was a defensive operation. Because of the Ten Year Rule with regards to defense spending established in 1919 that defense expenditure was to based on the assumption that there would be no major war in the next ten years, the British military was not capable of fighting a major war in 1931, which would been required as it was quite clear that the Japanese could only stopped in Manchuria via war. Moreover, the much vaulted Singapore strategy of sending the Royal Navy to its main Asian base in Singapore in the event of a war threatening in Asia was a sham in 1931 as construction started on the Singapore base in 1919 and was still not completed (the Singapore naval base was only completed in 1938). Lampson was in close contact with the Lord Lytton and in turn shared information from the commission with Johnson. Most notably, Lampson learned from Lytton that despite his best efforts he could find no evidence that supported the Japanese claims and that all the information indicated the Chinese claims of unprovoked aggression in Manchuria were true. For his part, Lampson expressed barely concealed joy at the "thrashing" the Kwantung Army gave the "unruly Chinese" as Zhang's army was defeated and driven out of Manchuria by early 1932. He tended to regard the Chinese with their endless demands to end the special rights enjoyed by foreign powers in China to be a difficult people. At the time, Lampson did not seem to see as others did, that the invasion of Manchuria was just the beginning of Japan's ambitions in Asia, and Japanese elites envisioned not just China, but all of Asia as being in their rightful sphere of influence. Most notably, the Japanese saw including the British colonies in Asia along with Australia and New Zealand as part of their sphere of influence. Lampson considered his time as a minister-plenipotentiary to China as a success as the only concession that he had to make was giving China tariff autonomy, but the other British special rights such as extraterritoriality, control over the Chinese Maritime Customs Service, and the treaty ports were still retained when he left China.

== Ambassador to Egypt ==
In 1934 he was appointed High Commissioner for Egypt and the Sudan. As first High Commissioner and than as ambassador in Cairo, Lampson had a grand position, having his office in the ornate and imposing British embassy and driven around Cairo by his chauffeur in a Rolls-Royce surrounded by motorcyclists blowing whistles. Symbolising the power dynamic, Egyptian politicians from the prime minister on down always visited Lampson at the embassy and never vice versa. For longer trips around Egypt, Lampson travelled in a special train with armed guards. The British historian Steven Morewood wrote that Lampson was far from being a traditional ambassador and "...was in fact a quasi governor-general or viceroy in all but name with all the trappings to match". Standing 6'5 and fond of wearing expensive suits, Lampson towered over most Egyptians. Lampson was charmed by Egypt, which he regarded as a wondrously exotic "Oriental" land, but as his Arabic was not particularly good, his contacts with ordinary Egyptians were only on a superficial level. French was the preferred language of Egypt's elite, and as Lampson was fluent in French, his contacts were almost entirely with the Egyptian elite. Until the 1952 revolution, Egypt was dominated by an elite made up of interrelated families of Turkish, Circassian and Albanian origin known to historians as the Turco-Circassian elite who owned most of the land, upon which the fellahen (Egyptian peasants) toiled upon as tenant farmers. The Turco-Circassian aristocracy made up less than 1% of the population, but owned 3/4 of all the farmland in Egypt. The Turco-Circassian elite had been created in the Ottoman era when the Sublime Porte had given all of the land to Egypt to various Turkish, Circassian and Albanian families who had done something to endear them to the Sublime Porte. Egypt under the rule of the Mohammad Ali dynasty was characterized by some of the starkest income disparities in the world as the rich in Egypt tended to be extremely rich while the poor tended to be extremely poor. Egyptian nationalists opposed to "foreign influence" were just as often referring to the Turco-Circassian elite as to the British. Egypt in the 1920s-1930s was dominated by a complex three-way struggle for power between the Egyptian Crown, the nationalistic Wafd Party, which represented the Egyptian middle classes, and the British.

In 1935, Lampson vetoed the plans of King Fuad to send his son, Crown Prince Farouk, to be educated at the Turin Military Academy (Fuad's alma mater as he had grown up in exile in Italy) and instead had the crown prince educated at the Royal Military Academy at Woolwich. Lampson believed that giving the crown prince a British military education would make him into an Anglophile, forming the basis of an alliance between Britain and the Egyptian Crown that would keep Egypt in the British sphere of influence. The attempt to give Farouk a British military education turned out to be a disaster as Farouk was far too lazy to ever study for his exams and expected as Egyptian royalty to be given the answers to his exams to allow him to have perfect marks. Instead of studying, Farouk spent his time in London where he went shopping, attended football matches with the Prince of Wales, and visited restaurants and brothels. Farouk had been spoiled by his parents, giving him an immense sense of entitlement, and he was outraged when his instructors refused to give him the answers and instead failed him. Far from making him into Anglophile as Lampson wanted, Farouk's time in Woolwich made him hate the British.

Autocratic, arrogant and dominating, Lampson regarded himself as the most senior British official in Egypt and called himself "the local vicar". He attempted to order about the British garrison in Egypt, involving him in contentious feuds with the local generals, admirals and air marshals who resented his claim to have authority over them. Lampson argued that merely defending Egypt to protect the Suez canal was insufficient. To use the Suez canal as the short route to Britain's colonies in Asia along with Australia and New Zealand require using the Mediterranean Sea. To sail from the Strait of Gibraltar to the Suez canal and vice versa required sailing past Italy. The danger of Italian naval and air attacks on British shipping in the central Mediterranean was in effect a way of severing the Suez route. Lampson argued to use the Suez canal required having sufficiently air and naval forces to keep control of the Mediterranean Sea, which involved him in a long dispute with both the Treasury, which objected to the expense, and the Admiralty, which preferred diplomacy as the best way of securing the Mediterranean route. During all his time in Cairo, he sent a regular stream of telegrams to London, seeking the support of the Foreign Office against the three services and the Treasury, which was opposed to his plans for more spending on the defense of Egypt. Even through Lampson caused the Foreign Office to be locked in constant disputes with the War Office, the Air Ministry and the Admiralty, successive Foreign Secretaries thought very highly of him and tended to back him at Whitehall, which explained Lampson's longevity as he served longer than any other British ambassador to Egypt.

In 1936 following demands from the Egyptian prime minister Mostafa el-Nahas of the nationalistic Wafd Party for a new Anglo-Egyptian treaty, Lampson embarked on the talks. The increasingly aggressive claims by Italy that the entire Mediterranean and Red Sea areas were in the Italian sphere of influence led to Lampson being instructed that because of "the rise of Italy as a Mediterranean and North African Power "that the retention of a British garrison on the Suez Canal and at or in the vicinity of Alexandria is essential". Despite the apparently weaker hand of el-Nahas, the two were about equal as the Foreign Secretary Anthony Eden advised Lampson: "Failure to negotiate a treaty with Egypt, followed by disturbances in that country, their suppression by British forces and the government of Egypt by His Majesty's Government by force and against the will of the Egyptian people, would be represented throughout the Arab Near East possibly as a sign of British bad faith, certainly as a proof of British imperialism pursued at the expense of a weaker Mohametan country." The threat that el-Nahas might instigate riots as he usually did when things did not go his way made the two sides about equal, through the fact that el-Nahas and the other Egyptian leaders were equally worried about Fascist Italy meant that the Egyptians wanted the British forces to stay in Egypt, at least as long as the Italian attitude remained threatening.

On 29 April 1936, King Fuad died unexpectedly and his 16-year-old son Farouk came to throne. Lampson wrote in his diary about Fuad's death: ""Slippery customer though he was, he was an immense factor in the situation here and...we could always in the last resort get him to act in any particular line that we wished". About the new King, Lampson wrote in his diary that he did not expect to have "...an young immature King on our hands. I frankly don't know quite how that problem is going to be handled". Lampson and King Farouk came to have an immense mutual hatred for each other. Lampson regarded Farouk as arrogant, immature, boorish, outrageously spoiled and generally obnoxious and hostile to British influence in Egypt, feeling that "the boy" as he revealingly called Farouk in his dispatches to London was in need of his guidance. The fact that Farouk had dismissed all of the British servants employed by his father, while keeping the Italian servants, suggested he had inherited Fuad's Italophilia. Farouk especially resented Lampson's attempts to set himself up as a surrogate father, finding him impossibly patronising and rude, complaining that at one moment Lampson would address him as a king and the next moment would call him to his face a "naughty boy". Lampson was 55 when Farouk acceded to the throne and he never learned how to treat the teenage Farouk as an equal. Farouk regarded Lampson as overbearing, rude, arrogant, and as a bully. King Farouk's first languages were Turkish and French (the languages of the Egyptian elite), and he always thought of himself as an Egyptian rather than as an Arab, having no interest in Arab nationalism except as a way of increasing Egypt's power in the Middle East. Farouk did not base his opposition to British influence in Egypt upon Arab nationalism, a viewpoint that was widely followed as most Egyptians did not see themselves as Arabs in this era and was only after the 1952 revolution that Egypt came to be defined as an Arab country. Despite the fiasco of Farouk's education at the Royal Military Academy, Lampson believed he together with assorted other British officials like the king's tutor, Edward Ford, could mould Farouk into an Anglophile. Lampson's plans were derailed when it emerged that Farouk was more interested in duck-hunting than Ford's lectures and that the king had "bragged" he would "have the hell" with the British, saying they had humiliated himself, his family and Egypt for long enough. Farouk's accession had changed the dynamic of Egyptian politics from being a struggle of an unpopular king vs. the popular Wafd party as it was under his father to that of a popular Wafd vs. an even more popular king. The Wafd-despite being the anti-British party-now wanted an alliance with Lampson against the very popular King Farouk, which was a reversal of the situation under King Fuad when the Egyptian Crown had been allied with the British against the Wafd.

As a result of the Anglo-Egyptian treaty of 1936, to which Lampson was a signatory, Britain loosened its grip on Egypt and the post title was changed to Ambassador to Egypt and High Commissioner for the Sudan in 1936. Under the terms of the treaty signed on 26 August 1936, the British retained the Suez canal base; the right to use Alexandria as a naval base for the next eight years along with the right to station air and ground forces to defend the Alexandria base; the right to defend the Egyptian border with the Italian colony of Libya; and the right to use all facilities in Egypt to support British forces in the event of war. Lampson made the concessions but, with respect to all of its essential points, the Anglo-Egyptian treaty was a triumph for British interests. Lampson was helped by the fact that el-Nahas and the rest of the Wafd were also concerned about Italian imperialism. The Italian conquest of Ethiopia in 1935-1936 served to the Egyptians as a terrifying warning that Mussolini was serious about his plans for a "new Roman empire" and was willing and able to use brutal means to achieve this objective. El-Nahas and the rest of the Wafd Party were anti-British nationalists, but faced with the choice between Italian imperialism and British imperialism, clearly felt the latter was preferable to the former. Lampson continued in this office until 1946.

The dominant figure in the Wafd Party was Makram Ebeid, the man widely considered to be the most intelligent Egyptian politician of the interwar era. Ebeid was a Coptic Christian, which made it unacceptable for him to be prime minister of Muslim majority Egypt, and so he exercised power via his protege Nahas, who was the official party leader. Leaders in the Wafd like Ali Maher, opposed to Ebeid and Nahas, looked to Farouk as a rival source of patronage and power. Both Ebeid and Nahas disliked Maher, regarding him as an intriguer and an opportunist, and found a further reason to dislike him even more when Maher became Farouk's favorite political adviser. The nationalistic Wafd Party was the most powerful political machine in Egypt, and when the Wafd was in power, it tended to be very corrupt and nepotistic. Those excluded from opportunities for corruption, like Maher Pasha, made much of the corruption, in particular the baleful influence of Nahas Pasha's dominating wife (who insisted on giving high government jobs to members of her family, no matter how unqualified they were). Through the Wafd Party had been founded in 1919 as the anti-British party, the fact that Nahas Pasha championed the 1936 treaty as the best way of keeping Mussolini from conquering Egypt as he had done Ethiopia, paradoxically led Lampson to favor Nahas and the Wafd as the most pro-British party, in turn leading opponents of the Wafd to attack them for "selling out" by signing a treaty which allowed the British to keep their garrisons in Egypt. As Farouk could not stand the overbearing Lampson, and saw the Wafd as his enemies, the king naturally aligned himself with the anti-Wafd factions and those who saw the treaty as a "sell out". Lampson personally favored deposing Farouk and putting his cousin Prince Mohammad Ali on the throne in order to keep the Wafd in power, but feared that a coup carried out by the British Army would destroy the popular legitimacy of Nahas.

Even through Egypt was his responsibility, Lampson also sought to involve himself in the affairs of the Palestine Mandate (modern Israel). Lampson was opposed to Zionism and the Balfour Declaration which committed Britain to creating a "Jewish national home" in Palestine, which he believed was inflaming the entire Muslim world against Britain. He wanted to end British support for a "Jewish national home" and to ban Jewish immigration into Palestine, which had increased markedly due to the increased anti-Semitic climate in Europe. In April 1936, the so-called Great Palestinian Arab Revolt broke out as the Palestinians rose up in a revolt to drive the British out. About the war in Palestine, a number of British Army units in Egypt were put "on loan" to Palestine, which Lampson was opposed to, warning it was weakening British power in Egypt as the units sent "on loan" were not being replaced. Lampson was opposed to the Palestinian demand for independence, but he supported the Palestinian demand to end Jewish immigration to Palestine. Lampson believed that the only reason for the Palestinian revolt was the plans of the Zionist leaders to establish a Jewish state in Palestine to be called Israel and if these plans could be aborted, the revolt would immediately end. In 1937, the Peel Commission, which had been appointed to find a solution to the "Palestine Question", recommended partition as the solution with the Palestine mandate to be ended and two states, one Arab and one Jewish, to be created. Lampson was opposed to the recommendations of the Peel commission, arguing that any sort of Jewish state in Palestine, was inflaming opinion in Egypt against the British.

In 1937, Sir Eric Phipps, the British ambassador to Germany, who had long wanted to serve as the ambassador to France instead, got his wish and was transferred from Berlin to Paris, creating a vacancy in the British embassy in Berlin. Eden had a short list of three diplomats to appoint as the new ambassador to Germany, namely Lampson; Sir Percy Loraine, the ambassador to Turkey; and Sir Nevile Henderson, the minister-plenipotentiary to Argentina. Lampson had very much wanted to serve as the ambassador to Berlin and lobbied Eden hard to have the Berlin appointment. Robert Vansittart, the Permanent Undersecretary in the Foreign Office for his part favored Henderson and it was largely due to Vansittart that Eden appointed Henderson as the new ambassador to Germany, much to Lampson's disappointment. Lampson supported appeasement and in his letters to Henderson expressed much support to hilm while the latter was serving as the British ambassador to Germany. In a typical letter to Henderson sent in early 1938, Lampson declared that the solution to Britain's problems "lies through Berlin" and attacked the government of Neville Chamberlain for being supposedly pro-French as Lampson complained that Britain was "tied to France's chariot". Lampson believed that the Rome-Berlin Axis was the principle reason for Benito Mussolini's aggressive claims that all of the Mediterranean was rightfully Italy's sphere of influence as he felt that Mussolini would not risk a war with Britain and/or France without the support of Germany. As such, Lampson believed if Adolf Hitler could be persuaded to severe his alliance with Italy, Mussolini would back down from his expansionist foreign policy, hence Lampson's claim that the solution to Italian imperialism "lies through Berlin". Eden was later to claim after 1945 that he regretted appointing Henderson as the ambassador to Germany and would had much preferred Lampson or Loraine to serve as the ambassador in Berlin, who were alleged to be anti-appeasement diplomats unlike the arch-appeaser Henderson. The British historian Peter Neville wrote that Henderson had a fascination with militaristic authority figures, which was expressed in his tendency with hero-worship towards first King Alexander of Yugoslavia when he served as the minister-plenipotentiary in Belgrade and later on Hermann Göring as the ambassador in Berlin. Henderson's hero-worship clearly influenced his diplomacy and his views on his host nations. Neville argued that if Lampson had he served as the ambassador in Berlin might had avoided the hero-worship of Góring, which so badly damaged Henderson's reputation, but on the main essentials of policy he clearly shared the same assumptions that influenced Henderson such as the belief that better Anglo-German relations were the key to world peace and that France rather than Germany was the principle problem in the world. Neville argued that the post-1945 claim that Lampson would have been an anti-appeasement ambassador is belied by the fact that Lampson was in 1937 on the short list as one of the three diplomats felt best able to improve relations with Nazi Germany, which does not support the thesis that Lampson would have been pursued a different policy than the one pursued by Henderson between 1937 and 1939.

In the fall of 1937, Farouk dismissed the Wafd government headed by Prime Minister Mostafa El-Nahas and replaced him as Prime Minister with Mohamed Mahmoud Pasha. The immediate issue were Nahas's attempts to dismiss Farouk's chef de cabinet Ali Maher together with Farouk's Italian servants, but the more general issue was who would rule Egypt: the Crown or Parliament? As a number of ministers in the new government were pro-Italian at the same time that Mussolini was increasing the number of Italian troops in Libya, Farouk's move was seen as pro-Italian and anti-British. Lampson delivered what he called a "little lecture" to Farouk, reporting to London: "It will be fatal if the boy [Farouk] comes to think he is invincible and can play any trick he likes. Personally I have always liked him and he certainly has a most remarkable intelligence and courage-one begins to fear almost too much of the latter". At a meeting at the Abdeen Palace in December 1937, where Lampson declared that London was opposed to the Mahmoud government, Lampson reported: "I found him rather baffling to deal with-in extraordinary good humour and apparently taking the whole thing rather flippantly whist at times relapsing into a very 'kingly' attitude". Farouk told Lampson that he didn't care if the Wafd had a majority in Parliament as he was the king and he wanted a prime minister who would obey him, not Parliament. Lampson ended the meeting by saying Quos deus vult perdere prius demntat ("Those God wishes to destroy, he first makes mad").

Egypt remained neutral in World War II, but under heavy pressure from Lampson, Farouk broke diplomatic relations with Germany in September 1939. On 12 February 1940, Lampson together with Archibald Wavell greeted the arrival of the Australian and New Zealand soldiers to Egypt, where they were to be trained before being sent on. Under the 1936 treaty, Britain had the right to defend Egypt from an invasion, which turned the Western Desert of Egypt into a battlefield when Italy declared war on Britain on 10 June 1940 and invaded Egypt. Maher declared Cairo an "open city" under international law, which in theory would require the British forces to leave Cairo as no military forces are allowed in an "open city", but the British simply disregarded the declaration. Under the 1936 treaty, the Egyptians were obligated to assist the British with logistical services, but Maher frustrated this by appointing corrupt bureaucrats to positions such as presidency of the Egyptian state railroad who demanded baksheesh in exchange for co-operating. Owing to the strategic importance of Egypt, ultimately 2 million soldiers from Britain, Australia, India and New Zealand arrived in Egypt and set off a massive bout of inflation that destabilised the Egyptian economy, making the war years a period of hardship and suffering for ordinary Egyptians. Lampson was against Egypt declaring war on the Axis powers despite the Italian invasion of Egypt as having Egypt as a belligerent would mean Egypt would have the right to attend the peace conference once the Allies had presumably won the war, and as Lampson put it, the Egyptians would make demands that would be "embarrassing" for the British at such a peace conference. On 17 June 1940, Lampson met with King Farouk to demand that Farouk dismiss Maher as prime minister and General al-Misri as chief of staff of the Egyptian Army, saying both were pro-Axis. Lampson wrote to London: "I repeated I hoped that he realized we were in deadly earnest. He said he knew that full well, and cryptically, that so was he". On 28 June 1940, Farouk dismissed Maher Pasha as prime minister, but refused to appoint Nahas Pasha as prime minister as Lampson wanted, saying that Nahas was full of "Bolshevik schemes". The new prime minister was Hassan Sabry, whom Lampson felt was acceptable, and despite his previous threats to kill him, Prince Hassanein was made chef de cabinet. Prince Hassanein had been educated at Oxford University and unusually for an Egyptian, was an Anglophile, having fond memories of his time in England when he studied at Oxford. Lampson had come to detest Farouk by this time, and his favorite advice to London was "the only thing to do is kick the boy out". In the words of the British historian Martin Francis, Lampson had a "pathological fixture" on King Farouk's colorful private life and in his dispatches to Eden reported in "almost porngraphic detail" about Farouk's incessant womanising, a subject which clearly fascinated him.

In 1941, Lampson supported the General Charles de Gaulle and the rest of the Free French movement in demanding that British forces invade the French mandates of Syria and Lebanon, which were controlled by Vichy France. Archibald Wavell, the commander of the Middle East Command, had been reluctant to heed de Gaulle's request for an invasion of the French Levant, and his hand had been forced after Vichy government had given German forces transit right to use Syria to reach Iraq. Tony Mayer, the manager of the Caisse centrale de la France libre made a secret payment of £1, 000 to Lampson, apparently as a reward for supporting the Free French movement. However, Lampson notably angered de Gaulle when he wanted to issue a promise of independence for Lebanon and Syria after the war in the name of both Britain and France, which led de Gaulle to declare that both Lebanon and Syria were held as French mandates for the League of Nations. In an attempt to soften relations with the Free French, on 19 June 1941 a conference was held in Cairo where Lampson, de Gaulle and Wavell worked out the terms under which the Vichy forces in the Levant would surrender.. In January 1942, when Farouk was away on vacation, Lampson pressured Serry Pasha into breaking diplomatic relations with Vichy France. As the king was not consulted about the serving of ties with Vichy France, Farouk used this violation of the constitution as an excuse to dismiss Serry and announced he planned to appoint Maher as prime minister again. Serry knew that his government was likely to be defeated on a motion of no confidence when Parliament opened on 3 February 1942, and in the meantime demonstrations by students at Cairo University and Al-Azhar University had broken out, calling for a German victory.

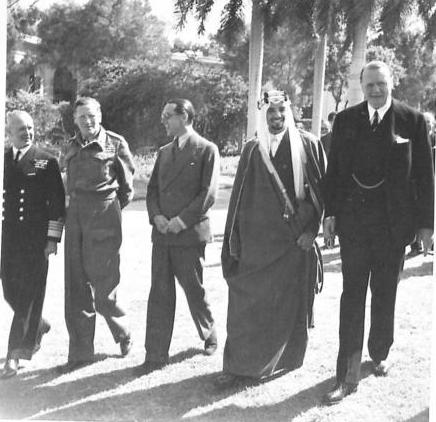
Lampson on the right greeting Prince Mansur Ibn Saud at the British embassy in Cairo, March 21 1942. Standing from left to right are Admiral Andrew Cunningham, the commander of the British Mediterranean fleet; General Claude Auchinleck, the Middle East theater commander; Sir Walter Monckton; Prince Mansour bin Abdulaziz Al Saud and Lampson.

As ambassador to Egypt he forced King Farouk I to change the cabinet to a Wafdist one through surrounding the king's palace with tanks in the Abdeen Palace incident of 1942. Lampson, pressed Farouk to have a Wafd or Wafd-coalition government replace Hussein Sirri Pasha's government. Lampson had Sir Walter Monckton flown in from London to draft an abdication degree for Farouk to sign as Monckton had drafted the abdication degree for Edward VIII and it was agreed that Prince Mohammad Ali would become the new king. Lampson wanted to depose Farouk, but General Robert Stone and Oliver Lyttleton both argued that if Farouk agreed to appoint Nahas Pasha prime minister that the public reaction to "throwing the boy out for giving us at 9 P.M the answer which we should have welcomed at 6 P.M." would be highly negative. Reluctantly, Lampson agreed that Farouk could stay if he agreed to make Nahas prime minister. Farouk asked his military how long the Egyptian Army could hold Cairo against the British and was told two hours. On the night of 4 February 1942, British troops and tanks surrounded Abdeen Palace in Cairo and Lampson presented Farouk with an ultimatum. While a battalion of British infantry took up their positions around the palace with the roar of tanks could be heard in the distance, Lampson arrived at the Abdeen Palace in his Rolls-Royce together with General Stone. As the doors to Abdeen Palace were locked, one of the British officers used his revolver to shoot open the door and Lampson stormed in, demanding to see the king at once. Farouk initially started to sign the abdication degree that Lampson had placed on his desk, but Prince Hassanein, who was present as a sort of mediator, intervened and spoke to Farouk in Turkish, a language which he knew that Lampson did not speak. Unknown to Lampson, three of Farouk's Albanian bodyguards were hiding behind the curtains in his study with orders to shoot the British ambassador if he should touch Farouk. Prince Hassanein's intervention had its effect, and Farouk turned to Lampson to say he was giving in. Farouk capitulated, and Nahhas formed a government shortly thereafter. However, the humiliation meted out to Farouk, and the actions of the Wafd in co-operating with the British and taking power, lost support for both the British and the Wafd among both civilians and, more importantly, the military. At the time, the incident caused the Egyptian people to rally around their king, on 11 February 1942 (his birthday by Western standards), he received was loudly cheered by the crowd on Abdeen Square. Farouk was seen at the time as a victim of British bullying, and the incident allowed him to blame on the problems of wartime Egypt on Nahas and Lampson. General Stone wrote Farouk a letter of apology for the incident. Air Marshal William Sholto Douglas wrote that Lampson had made a huge error in "treating King Farouk as if he were nothing but a naughty and rather silly boy...Farouk was naughty and he was still very young...but to my mind, and taking a hard-headed view, he was also the King of Egypt".

In April 1942, at a luncheon with Lampson and King George II of Greece, Farouk refused to speak to Lampson and told George that he would be wasting his time meeting the Wafd ministers as they were all ces canailles ("these scoundrels"). On 2 July 1942, Lampson visited the Abdeen Palace to tell Farouk that there was a real possibility of Axis forces taking Cairo and suggested that the king should flee to Khartoum if the Afrika Corps took Cairo. Farouk who had no intention of decamping to Khartoum simply walked out of the room. After the Battle of El Alamein, the Axis forces were driven out of Egypt and back into Libya, which caused Farouk to change his views over to a markedly pro-British direction. In the time honored fashion, the Wafd government headed by Nahas proved to be an extremely corrupt and Nahas is widely considered to be one of the most corrupt Egyptian prime ministers of all time. Nahas fell out with his patron, Makram Ebeid and expelled him from the Wafd at the instigation of his wife. Ebeid retaliated with The Black Book, a detailed expose published in the spring of 1943 listing 108 cases of major corruption involving Nahas and his wife. Even Lampson wrote in his diary that "the so-called book does seem to contain pretty damaging evidence". On 29 March 1943, Ebeid visited the Abdeen Palace to present Farouk with a copy of The Black Book and asked that he dismiss Nahas for corruption. Farouk attempted to use the furor caused by The Black Book as an excuse to dismiss the extremely unpopular Nahas, who had become Egypt's most hated man, but Lampson warned him via Prince Hassanein that he would be deposed if he dismissed his prime minister. Lampson in a dispatch to Sir Anthony Eden, who was once again Foreign Secretary, argued that Egypt needed political calm and to allow Farouk to dismiss Nahas would cause chaos as the latter would start "ranting" against the British. General Stone recommended that Lampson not be allowed to depose Farouk under the grounds that such a step was likely to cause anti-British rioting in Egypt which would require the British Army to put down, which Stone was opposed to under public relations grounds.

In 1943, when Lord Linithgow retired as Viceroy of India, Lampson almost achieved his long sought ambition of being the Viceroy of India. Lampson was on Winston Churchill's short list of candidates to be the next Viceroy as Churchill regarded Lampson as a success in Egypt and shared his imperialistic politics. The British historian John Grigg noted that Lampson shared Churchill's "die-hard" on opposing Indian independence, and the fact that Lampson was being seriously considered as the next Viceroy was a clear sign that Churchill did not intend to grant India independence. Instead, Churchill surprised everyone by appointing Wavell as the next Viceroy, which shocked many as Churchill was known to dislike Wavell and had sacked him as the Middle East theater commander in 1941.

In late 1943, Farouk started a policy giving support to student and working men's association and in early 1944 paid a visit to Upper Egypt, when he donated money to victims of the malaria epidemic. In April 1944, Farouk attempted to sack Nahas as prime minister over the latter's response to the malaria epidemic in Upper Egypt. Reflecting the importance of controlling patronage in Egypt, Nahas Pasha had gone on a separate relief tour of Upper Egypt apart from the king and founded a relief organization, the Nahas Institute, in his own name instead of the king as was normal to treat the thousands sickened with malaria. Farouk told Lampson that "there could not be two kings in Egypt" and the "semi-royal" nature of Nahas's tour of Upper Egypt was an insult to him. Farouk attempted to soften the blow by announcing the new prime minister would be the well known Anglophile Prince Hassanein, but Lampson refused to accept him. Lampson attempted to have Farouk deposed again, sending off a telegram to Churchill advising that Britain take "direct control" of Egypt. Lampson once again threatened Farouk, who remained flippant and dismissive. When Prince Hassanein tried to persuade Lampson to accept the dismissal of the deeply corrupt Wafd government as an improvement, the ambassador was unmoved, leading the normally Anglophile Hassanein to say the Egyptians were getting tired of British interference in their internal affairs. By 1944, the withdrawal of much the British garrison in Egypt together with the view that to depose Farouk would make him into a nationalist martyr led to much of the British Foreign Office feeling that Lampson's constant plans to replace the king would do more harm than good. Lord Moyne, the junior British foreign minister in charge of Middle Eastern affairs, told Lampson that his plans to depose Farouk in 1944 would damage Britain's moral position in the world and force the British to send more troops to Egypt to put down the expected riots when the main concern was the Italian theater of operations. General Bernard Paget rejected Lampson's plans to depose Farouk as the Egyptian Army was loyal to him, and to depose the king would mean going to war against Egypt, which Paget called an unnecessary distraction.

The day before Farouk was tentatively due to be deposed, Prince Hassanein arrived at the British Embassy with a letter for Lampson saying: "I am commanded by His Majesty to inform Your Excellency that he has decided to leave the present Government in Office for the time being". As Nahas become unpopular, he sought to embrace Arab nationalism to rally support, having Egypt join the Arab League in October 1944 and speaking more and more about "the Palestine question". In October 1944, when Lampson went away for a vacation in South Africa, Farouk finally dismissed Nahas as prime minister on 8 October 1944 and replaced him with Ahmed Maher, the brother of Ali Maher. The dismissal of Nahas was seen by Lampson as a personal defeat, who complained in his diary the British would never have a politician "in our pocket" like him again, and was seen as a decisive turning point when Farouk had finally outwitted Lampson. But at the same time, Lampson admitted that Nahas by his corruption had become a liability, and that Britain could not continue to support a corrupt government by threats of force in the long run, as the British people would not tolerate going to war with Egypt to keep someone like Nahas in office.

On 6 November 1944, Lord Moyne was assassinated in Cairo by two members of the extreme right-wing Zionist group, Lehi, better known as the Stern Gang. The two assassins, Eliyahu Bet-Zuri and Eliyahu Hakim, gunned down Lord Moyne and his chauffeur, but were then captured by the Cairo police. Afterwards, Bet-Zuri and Hakim were tried and sentenced to death by an Egyptian court. Farouk came under strong pressure from American Zionist groups to pardon the two assassins while Lampson pressured him not to pardon the assassins. For a time, Farouk escaped the matter by sailing on the royal yacht Mahroussa to Saudi Arabia to go on the haji to Mecca and meet King Ibn Saud. In March 1945, the assassins of Lord Moyne were hanged, and for the first time, Farouk was accused in the United States of being anti-Semitic.

Farouk declared war on the Axis Powers, long after the fighting in Egypt's Western Desert had ceased. On 13 February 1945, Farouk met President Franklin D. Roosevelt of the United States on abroad the cruiser USS Quincy, anchored in the Great Bitter Lake. Farouk seemed confused by the purpose of the meeting with Roosevelt, talking much about how after the war he hoped more American tourists would visit Egypt and Egyptian-American trade would increase. Through the meeting consisted mostly of pleasantries, Roosevelt did give Farouk the gift of a C-47 plane, to add to his airplane collection. After meeting Roosevelt, the king met Churchill who according to Lampson:

"...told Farouk that he should take a definite line in regard to the improvement of the social conditions in Egypt. He ventured to affirm that nowhere in the world were the conditions of extreme wealth and extreme poverty so glaring. What an opportunity for a young Sovereign to come forward and champion the interests and living conditions of his people. Why not take from the rich Pashas some of their superabundant wealth and devote it to the improvement of the living conditions of the feaheen?".

Farouk was more interested in learning if Egypt would be allowed to join the new United Nations and learned from Churchill that only nations that were at war with the Axis powers would be allowed to join the United Nations, which would replace the League of Nations after the war.

In 1919, it had been a great humiliation for the Egyptians that Egypt had been excluded from the Paris peace conference that led to the Treaty of Versailles and the League of Nations, causing the revolution of 1919. Farouk was determined that this time that Egypt would be a founding member of the United Nations, which would show the world that the country was ending its semi-colonial relationship with Britain. On 24 February 1945, Prime Minister Maher had the Chamber of Deputies issue declarations of war against German and Japan, and as he was leaving the Chamber, he was assassinated by Mahmoud Isawi, a member of the pro-Axis Young Egypt Society. Isawi was shaking Maher's hand and then pulled out his handgun, shooting the prime minister three times while screaming that he had betrayed Egypt by declaring war on Germany and Japan. When Lampson arrived at the Koubbeh Palace to see Farouk, he wrote he was shocked instead to see instead "...it was the wicked Aly Maer who was receiving condolences". As a result, Egypt attended the peace conference in San Francisco in April 1945 that founded the United Nations.

The new prime minister, Mahmoud El Nokrashy Pasha demanded that the British finally keep the terms of the 1936 treaty by pulling out of the Nile river valley while university students rioted in Cairo demanding the British leave Egypt altogether. Lampson by 1945 was widely seen in Whitehall as a Victorian anachronism, whose "white man's burden" view of Anglo-Egyptian relations was unrealistic and only Lampson's friendship with Churchill, who shared his views about maintaining the British Empire, kept him on as an ambassador in Cairo. The new Labour government that came into office in July 1945 wanted a new relationship with Egypt, and Farouk let it be known he wanted a new British ambassador. The new Labour Foreign Secretary, Ernest Bevin, a man of working-class origins, found the aristocratic Lampson to be a snob, and moreover Lampson's vehement disapproval of the Labour government's policy towards India further isolated him. Lampson still had the hope of one day being the Viceroy of India and was implacably opposed to independence for India. Finally, Lampson's feud with King Farouk meant there no positive basis for Anglo-Egyptian relations and that only threats of war could maintain Britain's special position in Egypt. However, owning to post-war economic problems, the new Labour government wanted to pull out all British military forces from the Nile river valley as a cost-saving measure while only keeping the British military base around the Suez canal, a policy that would make a repeat of the Abdeen Palace incident impossible. Lampson made it clear to Bevin that he was opposed to pulling British forces out of the Nile river valley for precisely that reason as he argued that only by making credible threats of war could keep Egypt in the British sphere of influence. Bevin saw Lampson's statements as a sign of the bankruptcy of his policies as British power in Egypt rested only on maintaining military forces in the Nile river valley that were financially impossible for the British government to continue. Bevin felt that Lampson's policies towards King Farouk were far too confrontational and that Britain needed a more diplomatic ambassador who might be able to find a way of maintaining British influence in Egypt whose policies were not based upon threats of brute force as Lampson's policies were. For all these reasons, Bevin was well disposed to Farouk's entreaties to replace Lampson. Farouk had vaguely promised to carry out social reforms, a major concern in London as the wartime inflation had led to increases in support for the Egyptian Communist Party on the left and the Muslim Brotherhood on the right, and was willing to negotiate a new relationship with Britain. Moreover, once the war had ended, the Wafd had returned to its traditional anti-British role, which led Whitehall to conclude that Farouk was London's best hope of keeping Egypt in the British sphere of influence. The Egyptian ambassador in London passed on messages from Farouk blaming Lampson all the problems in Anglo-Egyptian relations, and stated that Farouk would be willing to return to his father's policies of opposing the Wafd and of seeking British "moral support" after the war, but on the condition of sacking Lampson whom Farouk stated he could not stand.

Starting in June 1946, the British did finally pull out of the Nile river valley and henceforward the only place the British Army were stationed at in Egypt was at the gigantic base around the Suez Canal. In August 1946, the British pulled out of the Citadel in Cairo, and Farouk beamed as the Union Jack was lowered for the last time and the Egyptian flag went up over the Citadel for the first time since 1882. By September 1946, the British pull-out from the Nile valley was complete.

He was then Special Commissioner in Southeast Asia between 1946 and 1948. He was admitted to the Privy Council in 1941 and raised to the peerage as Baron Killearn, of Killearn in the County of Stirling, on 17 May 1943. He was also awarded the Order of the Rising Sun, Gold Rays with Neck Ribbon of Japan and the Order of the Sacred Treasure, Gold Rays with Neck Ribbon of Japan.

== Family ==
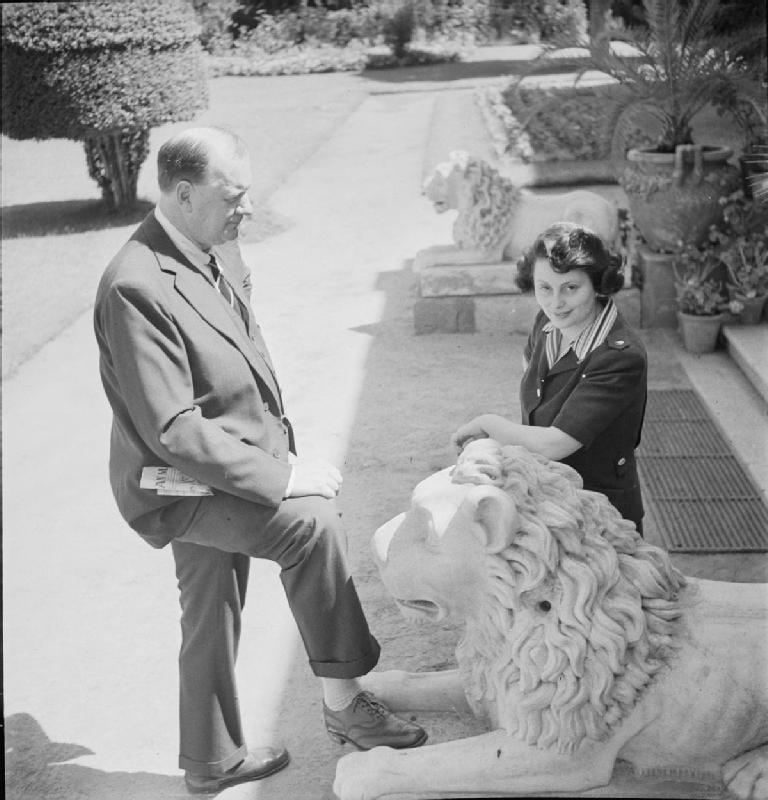
Lampson with his second wife Jacqueline in the gardens of the Cairo embassy

Lord Killearn married, first, Rachel, daughter of William Wilton Phipps, in 1912. They had one son and two daughters:

- Graham Curtis Lampson, 2nd Baron Killearn (1919–1996). He died leaving daughters only, the youngest Hon. Nadine Marisa Lampson being married to Sir Nicholas Bonsor, Bt.
- Hon. Mary Lampson
- Hon. Margaret Lampson

After Rachel's death in 1930 he married, secondly, Jacqueline Aldine Leslie Castellani (1910–2015), daughter of Aldo Castellani, KCMG (Hon.), in 1934. They had one son and two daughters:

- Victor Miles George Aldous Lampson, 3rd Baron Killearn. He has issue, including a son and heir apparent.
- Hon. Jacquetta Jean Frederica Lampson; she married Peregrine Eliot, 10th Earl of St Germans, and had issue, three sons.
- Hon. Roxana Rose Catherine Naila Lampson. She married Ian Ross, mother of six children, including the musicians Atticus Ross, Leopold Ross and the model Liberty Ross.

Lampson was a close personal friend of Sir Edward Peel.

== Succession ==
Lord Killearn died in September 1964, aged 84, and was succeeded in the barony by his son by his first marriage, Graham. As Graham died without male heirs, the title subsequently passed to Lord Killearn's son from his second marriage, Victor.

The 3rd Lord Killearn took legal action in 2011 to prevent his mother selling off the family home, Haremere Hall.

== Arms ==
Coat of arms of Miles Lampson, 1st Baron Killearn
Crest A gryphon's head erased Gules charged with an escarbuncle Argent between two wings paly of four Argent and Gules. Escutcheon Per saltire Argent and Gules two gryphons' heads in fess and as many escarbuncles in pale counterchanged. Supporters Dexter a camel Proper with head stall and rope reflexed over the back Gules, sinister a Chinese dragon also Proper. Motto Persevera Et Vince (Persevere And Conquer)

== See also ==
- List of ambassadors of the United Kingdom to Egypt
- Egypt in World War II

== Sources ==
- Lord Killearn, The Killearn Diaries, 1934–1946, London: Sidwick and Jackson, 1972. ISBN 9780283978777.
- Bátonyi, Gábor (1999). Britain and Central Europe, 1918-1933. Oxford: Clarendon Press. ISBN 9780191542824.
- Boyce, Robert (2009). The Great Interwar Crisis and the Collapse of Globalization. London: Palgrave Macmillan. ISBN 9780230280762.
- Brunero, Donna (2006). Britain's Imperial Cornerstone in China The Chinese Maritime Customs Service, 1854-1949. London: : Taylor & Francis. ISBN 9781134340941.
- Buhite, Russell (1986). Decisions at Yalta an appraisal of summit diplomacy. Scholarly Resources..
- Cohen, Michael (2014). Britain's Moment in Palestine: Retrospect and Perspectives, 1917-1948. London: Routledge. ISBN 0415729858.
- Dayer, Roberta Allbert (2013). Bankers and Diplomats in China 1917-1925 The Anglo-American Relationship. London: Taylor & Francis. ISBN 9781135167653.
- Dukes, Paul (2022). Russia in Manchuria A Problem of Empire. London: Taylor & Francis. ISBN 9781000452969.
- Dutton, David (2011). "Guilty Men? Three British Foreign Secretaries of the 1930s". In Frank McDonough (ed.). Origins of the Second World War An International Perspective. London: Continuum. pp. 144–167.
- Fenby, Jonathan (2003). Chiang Kai-shek China's Generalissimo and the Nation He Lost. New York: Free Press. ISBN 9780743231442.
- Foulk, Charles (2022). The Price of Freedom Financing French Resistance in World War II. New York: : Springer International Publishing. ISBN 9783031090660.
- Fung, Edmund (1991). The Diplomacy of Imperial Retreat Britain's South China Policy, 1924-1931. Oxford: Oxford University Press. ISBN 9780195852844.
- Francis, Martin (2022). Empire, Celebrity and Excess King Farouk of Egypt and British Culture 1936-1965. London: Bloomsbury Publishing. ISBN 9781350124608.
- Fraser (2011). "The Middle East and the Coming of War". In Frank McDonough (ed.). Origins of the Second World War An International Perspective. London: Continuum. pp. 327–341.
- Grigg, John (1980). 1943 The Victory that Never was. London: Eyre Methuen. ISBN 9780413396105.
- Kennedy, Greg (2013). Anglo-American Strategic Relations and the Far East, 1933-1939 Imperial Crossroads. London: Taylor & Francis. ISBN 9781136340154.
- Kwong, Chi Man (2017). War and Geopolitics in Interwar Manchuria Zhang Zuolin and the Fengtian Clique During the Northern Expedition. Leiden: Brill. ISBN 9789004340848.
- Ion, : A. Hamish (1990). The Cross and the Rising Sun The Canadian Protestant Missionary Movement in the Japanese Empire, 1872-1931. Waterloo: Wilfrid Laurier University Press.
- Yapp, M.E. (ed.): Politics and diplomacy in Egypt: The diaries of Sir Miles Lampson, 1935–1937, Oxford: Published for the British Academy by Oxford University Press, 1997.
- Lord Killearn's Diaries: Custodial history: In the possession of Lord Killearn, the Lampson family, Drs Trefor Evans and David Steeds of the University of Aberystwyth. Reference code: GB165-0176. Dates of creation: 1926–1951. 8 boxes 25 volumes. Scope and content: 25 MS and TS volumes of diaries, 1926–51, covering his service in China, Egypt and the Sudan, and South-East Asia.
- Cassandra Jardine: "Grande dame is still giving high society plenty of cause for gossip", in: The Independent, Sunday 27 January 2008. Describes the life and times of the Dowager Lady Killearn (née Jacquetta Aldine Leslie Castellani).
- O'Sullivan, Christopher D.: FDR and the End of Empire: The Origins of American Power in the Middle East., Palgrave Macmillan, 2012.
- Morewood, Steven (2005). The British Defence of Egypt, 1935-1940 Conflict and Crisis in the Eastern Mediterranean. London: Frank Cass. ISBN 9780714649436.
- Morsy, Laila (October 1984). "Farouk in British Policy". 'Middle Eastern Studies. 20 (4): 193–211. JSTOR 4283037.
- Morsy, Laila (January 1994). "Indicative Cases of Britain's Wartime Policy in Egypt, 1942-44". Middle Eastern Studies. 30 (1): 91–122. JSTOR 4283617..
- Neville, Peter (1999). Appeasing Hitler The Diplomacy of Sir Nevile Henderson, 1937-39. London: Palgrave Macmillan. ISBN 9780230377639.
- Salzmann, Stephanie (2003). Great Britain, Germany, and the Soviet Union Rapallo and After, 1922-1934. London: Royal Historical Society. ISBN 9780861932603.
- Shipley White, Dorothy (1964). Seeds of Discord De Gaulle, Free France, and the Allies. Syracuse: Syracuse University Press. ISBN 9780815600381.
- Stadiem, William (1991). Too Rich: The High Life and Tragic Death of King Farouk. New York: Carroll & Graf Pub. ISBN 0-88184-629-5.
- Smith, Charles (November 1979). "4 February 1942: Its Causes and Its Influence on Egyptian Politics and on the Future of Anglo-Egyptian Relations, 1937-1945". International Journal of Middle East Studies. 10 (4): 453–479.
- Steller, Verena (2016). "Reach back to the Future: Rediscovery of Diplomatic Conduct and the Moment of Foreign Policy Transformation-Diplomacy Between Versailles and Locarno, 1919-1925". In Andreas Fahrmeir, Gunther Hellmann, Miloš Vec (ed.). The Transformation of Foreign Policy Drawing and Managing Boundaries from Antiquity to the Present. Oxford: Oxford University Press. pp. 165–208. ISBN 9780191086410.
- Thompson, Peter (2010). Anzac Fury The Battle of Crete 1941. Sydney: : Random House Australia. ISBN 9781864715606.
- Ven, Hans van de (2014). Breaking with the Past The Maritime Customs Service and the Global Origins of Modernity in China. New York: : Columbia University Press. ISBN 9780231510523.

Diplomatic posts
Preceded by Sir Percy Loraine, Bt	British High Commissioner to Egypt; 1933–1936	Became Ambassador due to 1936 Treaty
New office	British Ambassador to Egypt; 1936–1946	Succeeded by Ronald Ian Campbell
Peerage of the United Kingdom
New creation	Baron Killearn; 1943–1964	Succeeded by Graham Lampson
