= Hessenford (disambiguation) =

Hessenford is a village in Cornwall, England, UK.

Hessenford may also refer to:

- St Anne's Church, Hessenford
- Hessenford railway station, a proposed but unbuilt railway station
