= Clayton and Bell =

English glassmaking company

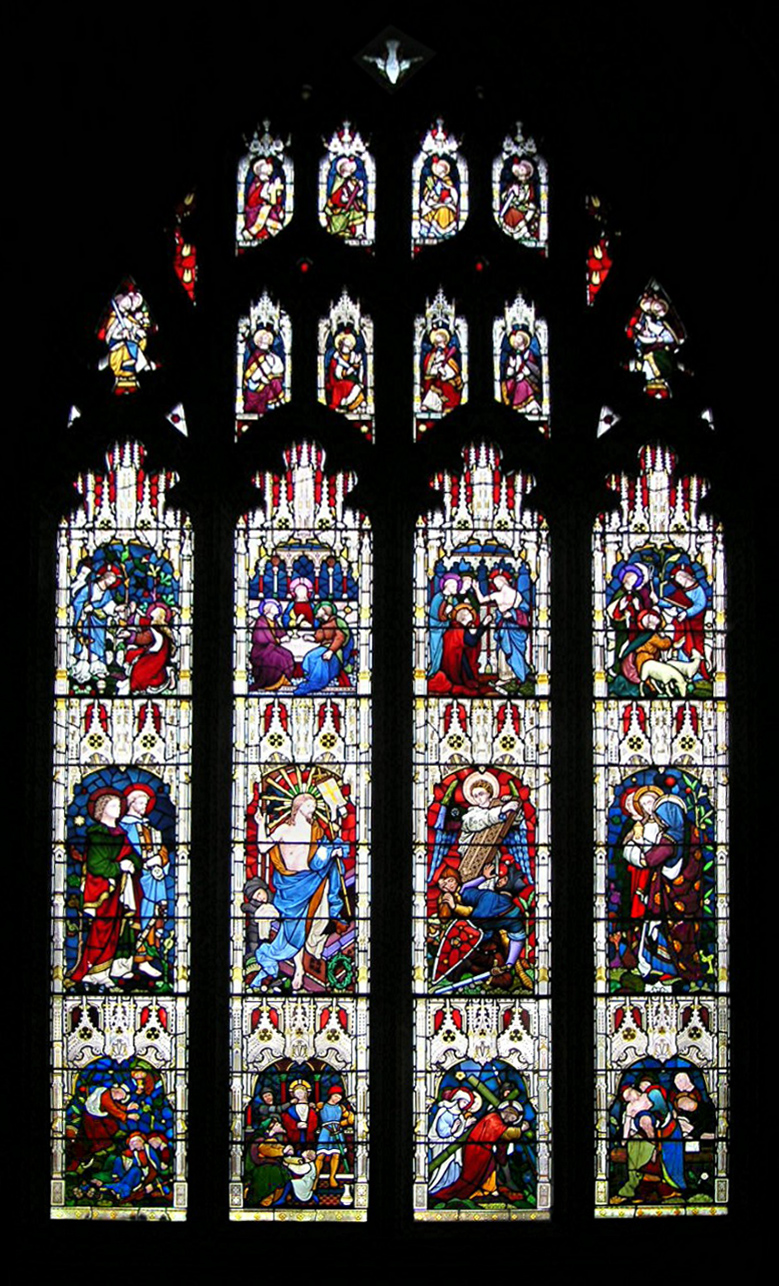
From Peterborough Cathedral

Clayton and Bell was one of the most prolific and proficient British workshops of stained-glass windows during the latter half of the 19th century and early 20th century. The partners were John Richard Clayton (1827–1913) and Alfred Bell (1832–1895). The company was founded in 1855 and continued until 1993. Their windows are found throughout the United Kingdom, in the United States, Canada, Australia and New Zealand.

Clayton and Bell's commercial success was due to the high demand for stained-glass windows at the time, their use of the best-quality glass available, the excellence of their designs and their employment of efficient factory methods of production.

They collaborated with many of the most prominent Gothic Revival architects and were commissioned, for example, by John Loughborough Pearson to provide the windows for the newly constructed Truro Cathedral.

== Background ==
During the Medieval period, from the Norman Conquest of England in 1066 until the 1530s, much stained glass was produced and installed in churches, monasteries and cathedrals. Two historic events had brought an end to this and the destruction of most of the glass: the Dissolution of the Monasteries under Henry VIII, and the Puritan era under Oliver Cromwell in the 17th century.

The early 19th century was marked by a renewal of the Christian faith, a growth of Roman Catholicism, a planting of new churches, particularly in centres of industrial growth, and the restoration of many ancient churches and cathedrals. Leaders in the movement to build new churches and cathedrals were William Butterfield, Augustus Welby Pugin, Sir George Gilbert Scott, John Loughborough Pearson, G.F. Bodley and George Edmund Street. They generally designed churches in a manner that sought to revive the styles of the Medieval period.

== History ==
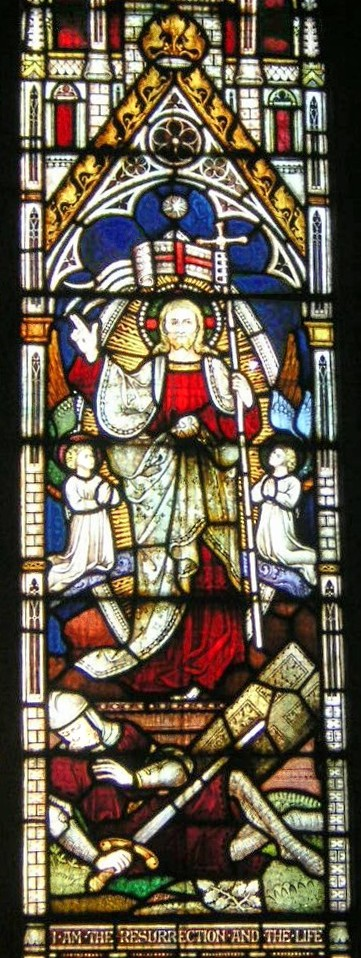
Detail, East window, St Peter's, Burnham

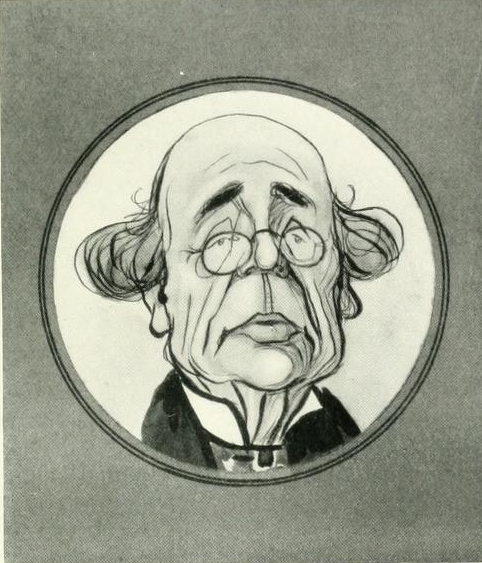
Caricature of John Richard Clayton

In the 1850s a number of young designers worked in conjunction with the Gothic Revival architects in the provision of stained glass for new churches and for the restoration of old. These included John Richard Clayton, Alfred Bell, Clement Heaton, James Butler, Robert Bayne, Nathaniel Lavers, Francis Barraud and Nathaniel Westlake. The eight worked in a number of combinations, Alfred Bell initially working at G. G. Scott's architectural practice in the 1840s, then forming a partnership with Nathaniel Lavers before forming a partnership with Clayton in 1855.

Initially Clayton and Bell's designs were manufactured by Heaton and Butler, with whom they shared a studio between 1859 and 1862, employing the very talented Robert Bayne as a designer as well. From 1861 Clayton and Bell commenced manufacturing their own glass. Robert Bayne became part of the partnership with Heaton and Butler, forming the firm Heaton, Butler and Bayne. Nathaniel Lavers, who had worked with Bell, also formed a partnership as Lavers, Barraud and Westlake in 1862.

There was a good deal of interaction and influence between Clayton and Bell, and Heaton, Butler and Bayne. The windows of both firms share several distinguishing features and characteristic colour combinations that are uncommon in other designers.

Clayton and Bell moved into large premises in Regent Street, London, where they employed about 300 people. In the late 1860s and 1870s the firm was at its busiest, and employees worked night shifts in order to fulfil commissions.

After the deaths of Alfred Bell in 1895 and John Richard Clayton in 1913, the firm continued under Bell's son, John Clement Bell (1860–1944), then under Reginald Otto Bell (1884–1950) and lastly Michael Farrar-Bell (1911–1993) until his death.

The records of Clayton and Bell were largely lost after bombing.

== Important commissions ==
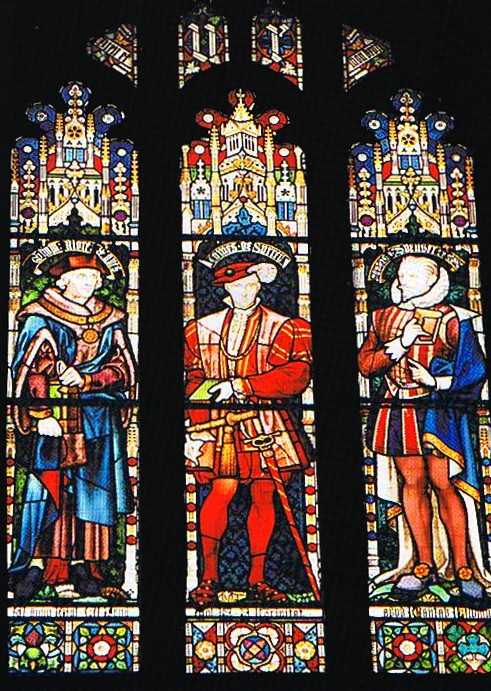
From the Great Hall, University of Sydney, 1858, Thomas More, Surrey and Spencer

Clayton and Bell's windows may be found all over England and in many countries abroad. Among their major commissions, and perhaps the first entire cycle of glass produced in the Victorian era, is the cycle of great scholars produced for the Great Hall of the University of Sydney, designed by the colonial architect Edmund Blacket and based upon Westminster Hall in London.

Among their other famous windows are the West Window of King's College Chapel, Cambridge, 1878, a very sensitive commission as much ancient glass still existed in the building, and also in Cambridge, a Last Judgement for the Chapel of St John's College.

Another significant commission was to design the mosaics for each side and beneath the canopy of the Albert Memorial. This towering monument set on the edge of Hyde Park in London commemorates the Prince Albert, husband of Queen Victoria, who died in 1861. The Queen remained in deep mourning until the ornate structure was unveiled, complete with a gilt statue of her husband. The firm of Salviati from Murano, Venice, had manufactured the mosaics to Clayton and Bell's designs. Not surprisingly, the firm of Clayton and Bell was awarded a Royal Warrant by the Queen in 1883.

At Truro they were commissioned by John Loughborough Pearson to design windows for the new Cathedral, and of these windows it is claimed "The stained glass which was made by Clayton and Bell is thought to be the finest Victorian stained glass in England and tells the story of the Christian Church, starting with the birth of Jesus and finishing with the building of Truro Cathedral."

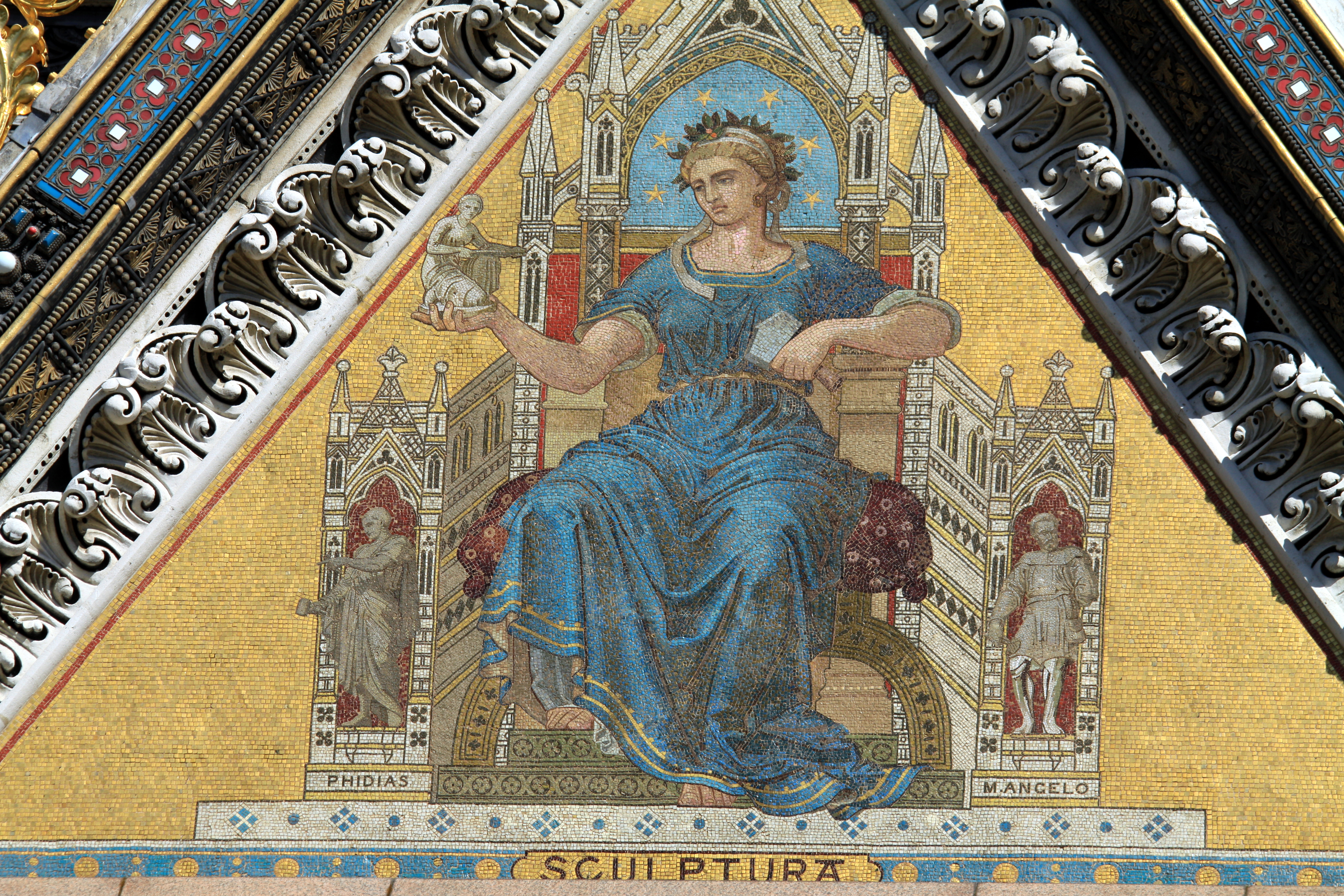
Mosaic representing the Art of Sculpture from the Albert Memorial

In London, another new cathedral was under construction: the Byzantine-style, enormously ornate (and as yet incompletely decorated), Catholic Cathedral of Westminster, designed by John Francis Bentley. Many designers were employed as the cathedral has a series of chapels, each different in concept. Lord Brampton, a recent convert to Roman Catholicism, selected Clayton and Bell to fill his commission for an altarpiece for the Chapel of Saints Augustine and Gregory, representing the conversion of England to Christianity. Clayton designed the mosaics in much the way that he designed stained glass, in a Victorian Gothic manner, but with a gold ground, traditional to the ancient mosaics of Venice. Although the work was to be assembled by Salviati's workshop on Murano, the tiles were English, having been made by a technique developed by the stained-glass firm of James Powell and Sons and manufactured by that firm. Clayton despatched the cartoons and the tiles to Venice, where the expert mosaicists selected and glued them face-down to the drawing, a technique said to have been devised by Salviati. The tiles were then adhered to the wall surface and the paper removed, leaving the mosaic intact. Lord Brampton died in 1907, to be commemorated by a mosaic of the "Just Judge". One of Clayton's last commissions was the design for another mosaic for the chapel "Non Angli sed Angeli", donated by the Choir in 1912.

== The glass of Clayton and Bell ==
The 19th-century windows of Clayton and Bell are typified by their brilliant luminosity. This is because they were quick to adopt the advice of the student of Medieval glass Charles Winston, who propounded that "modern" commercially made coloured glass was not effective for stained-glass windows, as it lacked the right refractive quality. In 1863 John Richard Clayton was among those who was experimenting with the manufacture of so-called pot metal or coloured glass produced by simple ancient manufacturing techniques which brought about great variability in the texture and colour of glass which is characteristic of ancient windows.

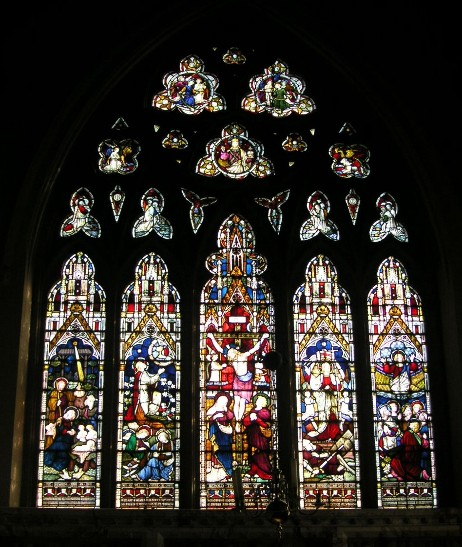
The east window of St Peter's, Burnham

Clayton and Bell were familiar with both ancient windows and with the various artistic movements of their time, such as the Pre-Raphaelite Brotherhood. Their work shows the influence of both, but not the dominance of either. It is, rather, an elegant synthesis of archaeologically sourced details, such as their characteristic brightly coloured canopies which are of a 14th-century style, with figures who pay passing homage to the medieval in their sweeping robes of strong bright colours, a surety and refinement of the painted details and an excellence of design which never fails to integrate the structural lines of the lead into the overall picture.

Clayton and Bell were masters of story-telling. Many of their finest works are large multi-light East or West windows depicting the most dramatic moments in the Biblical narratives of the Life of Christ. Although they were capable of producing rows of dour prophets, gentle saints and mournful crucifixions, what they excelled at was scenes of Christ bursting forth from the tomb, the descent of the Holy Spirit to the disciples and the Archangel Michael calling forth the dead on the Day of Judgement. They had ways of depicting rays of light that they put into practice ten years before most of their rivals attempted such dramatic atmospheric effects in the 1870s. The thing that makes these "special effects" of Clayton and Bell the more remarkable is that they were achieved with little resource to painted glass and flashed glass and without the multi-coloured Favrile glass used by Louis Comfort Tiffany studios and the Aesthetic designers of the United States. In fact, they used little more than radiating bands of red, yellow and white glass coupled with a formalised style of cloud painting that had been used by ancient stained glass and panel painters. The effects achieved by apparently simple means are often of overwhelming impact. A renowned example that is reproduced in various books on the topic of stained glass is the Last Judgement window of St Mary's church, Hanley Castle, Worcestershire, dating from 1860.

Clayton and Bell excelled in their use of colour. The designing of a stained-glass window that "works" from a visual point of view is a more complex matter than simply drawing up a cartoon and painting the colours in. What works on paper does not necessarily work when it has the added element of light streaming through it. Some colours are notoriously difficult. Blue glass, frequently used for backgrounds, can create a halo effect that dominates the window. Red and blue together can create a jumping discordant pattern that is quite nasty to look at. Faces can bleach out completely. Green can simply turn black.

Composite view of two panels demonstrating colour and technique

But with these potential hazards, Clayton and Bell consistently turned out windows in which the balance of colour is eminently satisfying to the eye. They had the happy knack of selecting exactly the right tonal values so that difficult colour combinations (such as red and green laid side by side as the cloth and lining of a cloak) appear inevitable. Moreover, their colour choices are rarely timid. (A "safe" choice is to line every cloak with yellow in the form of an applied silver-stain.) Although most of the colours in their windows are primaries – basic red, yellow and blue with a mid-tone grassy green – they introduced judiciously placed tertiary colours such as russet, brownish purple and a sort of mustard colour. The mustard colour often appears in conjunction with a bright intense blue. They frequently clothed a central figure in a robe of this bright blue, in contrast to the dark blue of the background and the bright red of surrounding robes.

In common with Heaton, Butler and Bayne, Clayton and Bell often robed figures in their windows with dark-coloured cloaks that are dotted with gold stars or flowers. In general practice, a cloak was arranged in such a way that it could be cut from fairly large pieces of glass, so that the main folds fell along lead lines and the lesser folds could be applied with paint. But the characteristic "gold-star" decoration of Clayton and Bell necessitated that the entire cloak be divided into little pieces of coloured glass, with the gold stars set at the intersections. This created a network of lead which was not necessarily visually desirable. But in practice, the yellow stars catch the eye of the viewer to the extent that the lead disappears. It is another very effective technique for creating a rich and lively appearance, without resorting to heavy over-painting.

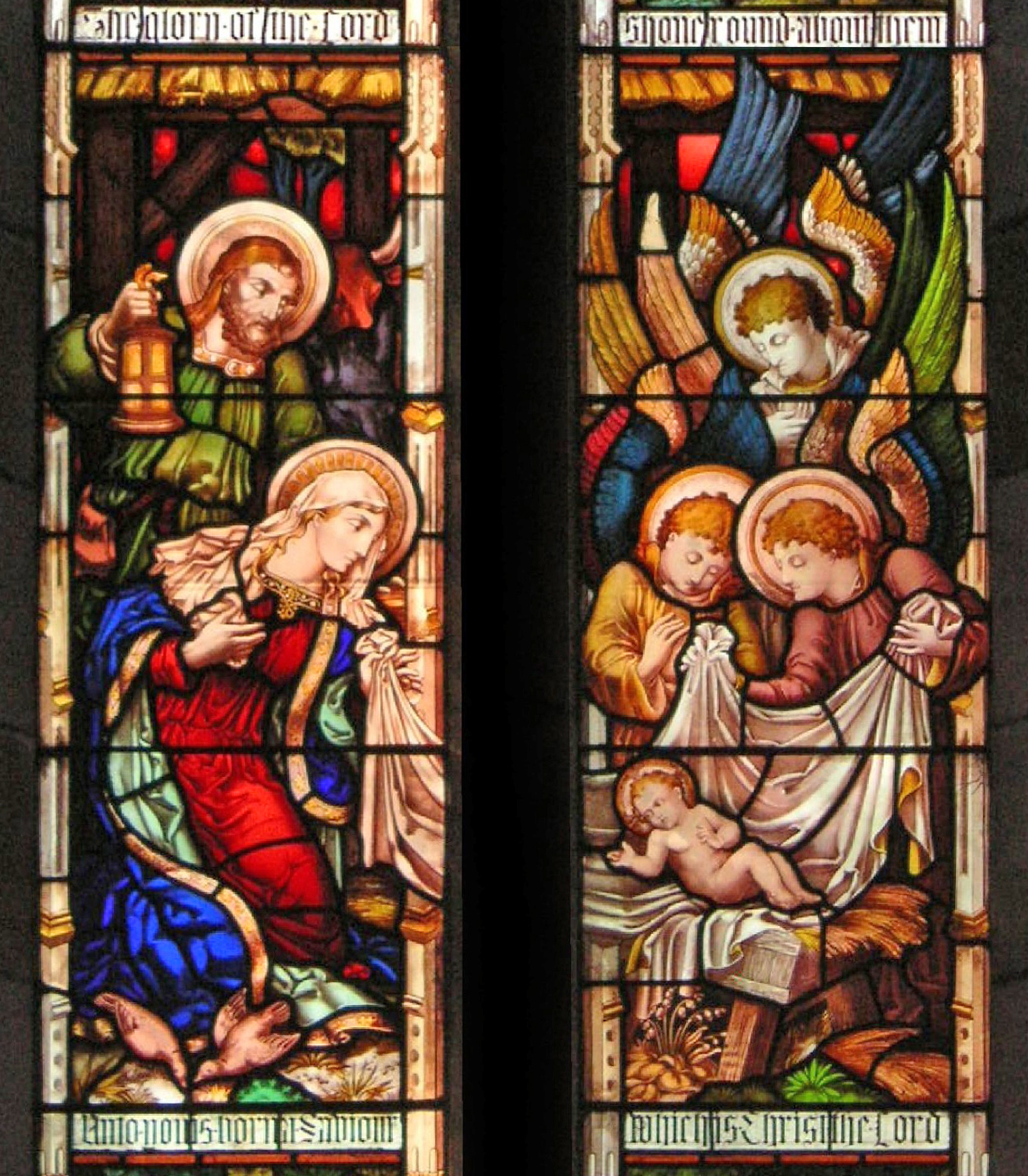
The Nativity (c. 1875) based on a German engraving

Coupled with the brilliant coloration, is an excellence in the painted details. This is particularly apparent in the features of the figures which show a mastery over the handling of a difficult medium that, in their earlier works, few of their contemporaries could equal, each fine line of paint being applied with the steadiness of hand and elegance of form of a master calligrapher. The quality of the work when the firm was at its busiest in the 1870s became heavier, as it also did with other firms in that decade. There was a trend for a greater naturalism in the depiction of figures. This was often achieved by the application of more paint and at the expense of colour and luminosity. There was also a reliance upon German engravings such as those by the artist Martin Schongauer. Also, an increasing number of commissions came from individuals wishing to commemorate a family member in their local church rather than from architects who were themselves designers and appreciated the creative process.

In the 1880s, Clayton and Bell's work went through something of a revival. Remarkably, many windows produced in the 1880s and 90s have recaptured something of the freshness and brightness of the earlier works. They are in strong contrast to those of their pupils Burlison and Grylls, who specialised in silvery backgrounds with ornate canopies under which stand solidly three-dimensional figures in vast cloaks of wine red and indigo blue.

In the 20th century, Michael Farrar-Bell continued the tradition of figurative window design, using backgrounds of transparent quarries and maintaining much the same range of coloured glass as had been perfected by Clayton in the 1860s.

== Buildings with Clayton and Bell windows ==
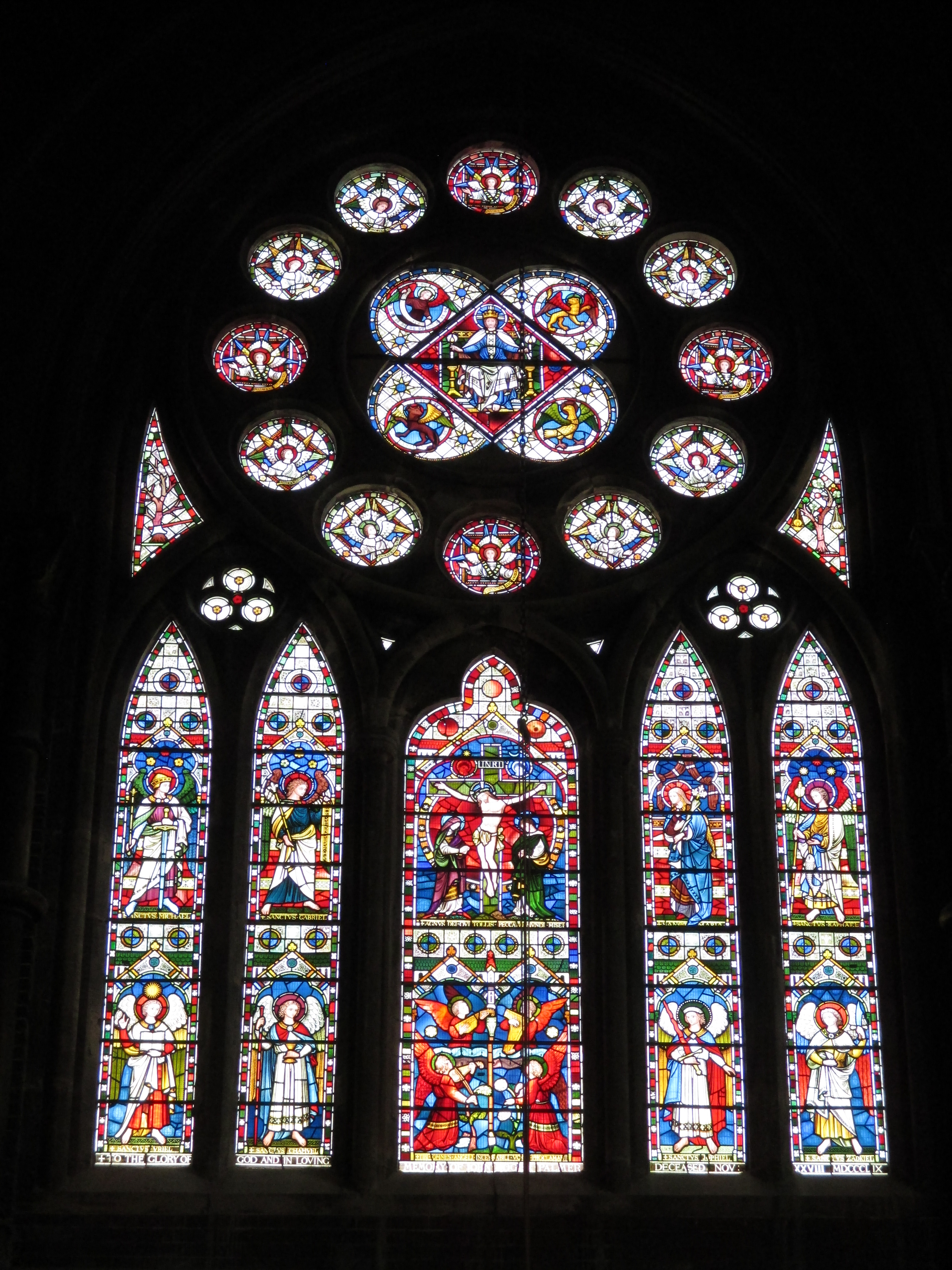
East window of St Michael and All Angels Church, Brighton

England

- St John's College Chapel, Cambridge, Cambridgeshire
- Wesley House Chapel, Cambridge, Cambridgeshire
- St Michael's Church, Chester, Cheshire
- St Anne's Church, Hessenford, Cornwall
- St Peter's Church, Bournemouth, Dorset
- Sherborne Abbey, Sherborne, Dorset
- St Michael and All Angels' Church, Brighton, East Sussex
- St Michael and All Angels, Shoreditch, London (EC2A)
- St Saviour's Church, Eastbourne, East Sussex
- All Saints' Church, Hove, East Sussex
- Church of St Michael and All Angels, Garton on the Wolds, East Yorkshire
- Church of St Katherine, Ickleford, Hertfordshire
- Canterbury Cathedral, Canterbury, Kent
- St Peter's Church, Leicester, Leicestershire
- St John the Evangelist's Church, Knotty Ash, Liverpool
- St Mary the Virgin Church, Camden Town, London (NW3)
- King's College Hospital, Camberwell, London (SE5)
- St Margaret's Church, Lee, London, London (SE12)
- St Philip and St James' Church, Whitton, London (TW2)
- St John the Baptist Church, Holland Road, London (W14)
- St Paul's, Hammersmith, London (W6)
- St Christopher's Chapel, Great Ormond Street Hospital, London (WC1)
- Church of St Andrew and St Peter, Blofield, Norfolk
- St Lawrence's Church, Brundall, Norfolk
- All Saints' Church, East Winch, Norfolk
- St Edmund's Church, Emneth, Norfolk
- St Andrew's Church, Framingham Pigot, Norfolk
- All Saints' Church, Freethorpe, Norfolk
- St Peter's Church, Hockwold cum Wilton, Norfolk
- St Peter's Church, Kimberley, Norfolk
- St Ethelbert's Church, Larling, Norfolk
- Norwich Cathedral, Norwich, Norfolk
- St Botolph Church, Westwick, Norfolk
- St Nicholas Church House, Kyloe, Northumberland
- All Saints' Chapel, Bloxham School, Bloxham, Oxfordshire
- Christ Church Cathedral, Oxford, Oxfordshire
- Exeter College Chapel, Oxford, Oxfordshire
- St Swithun's Church, Cheswardine, Shropshire
- Christ Church, Bath, Somerset
- Church of St Thomas à Becket, South Cadbury, Somerset
- St Benedict Biscop Church, Wombourne, Staffordshire
- Wentworth Woodhouse Chapel, Rotherham, South Yorkshire
- St Saviour's Church, High Green, Sheffield, South Yorkshire
- Saint Edmundsbury and Ipswich Cathedral, Bury St Edmunds, Suffolk
- St Agnes, Exning, Newmarket, Suffolk
- St Barnabus' Church, Ranmore Common, Surrey
- St Andrew's Church, Rugby, Rugby, Warwickshire, Warwickshire
- All Saints' Church, West Hoathly, West Sussex
- All Souls' Church, Halifax, West Yorkshire
- Trinity Church, Ossett, West Yorkshire
- Salisbury Cathedral Salisbury, Wiltshire

Wales

- Holy Trinity Church, Pont-ar-Gothi, Carmarthenshire

Scotland

- St Machar's Cathedral, Aberdeen, Aberdeenshire
- Udny Parish Church, Udny Green, Aberdeenshire
- Govan Old Parish Church, Govan, Glasgow

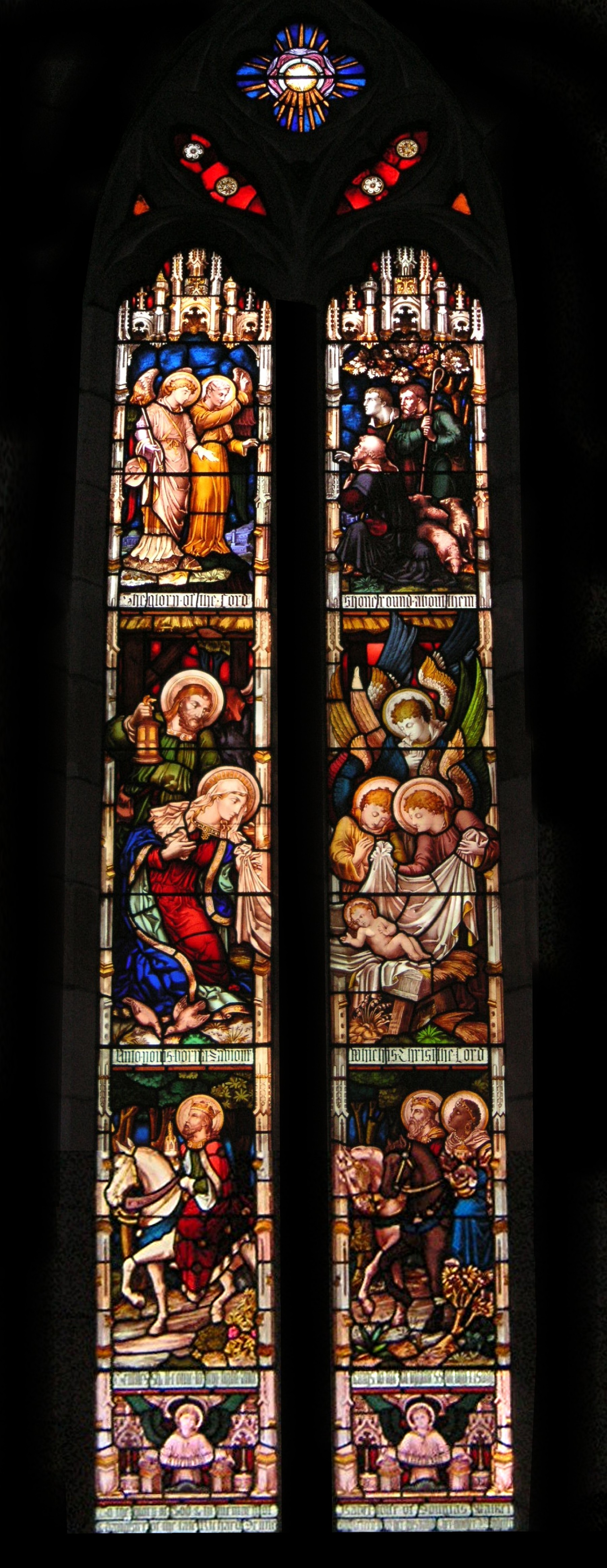
A nativity in the style of a German engraving. St John's, Darlinghurst, Sydney, c. 1875

Australia

- St John's Church, Darlinghurst, New South Wales
- Christ Church St Laurence, Sydney, New South Wales
- Great Hall of the University of Sydney, Sydney, New South Wales
- St Patrick's Cathedral, Ballarat, Victoria

Canada

- Central Presbyterian Church, Hamilton, Ontario
- St James' Cathedral, Toronto, Ontario
- Christ Church Cathedral, Montreal, Quebec
- Redpath Hall, Montreal, Quebec
- St John's (Stone) Church, Saint John, New Brunswick

France

- Holy Trinity Church, Nice, Alpes-Maritimes

Ireland

- Anglican Church, Virginia, County Cavan

Italy

- St Paul's Within the Walls, Rome

New Zealand

- Christ Church, Ellerslie, Auckland Region

Switzerland

- Christ Church, Lausanne, Vaud

United States

- Grace Church, Amherst, Massachusetts
- Old South Church, Boston, Massachusetts
- Trinity Church, Boston, Massachusetts
- Millicent Library, Fairhaven, Massachusetts
- St Peter's Episcopal Church, Albany, New York State
- St Thomas' Church, Mamaroneck, New York State
- Fourth Universalist Society in the City of New York, Manhattan, New York State
- Church of the Incarnation, New York City, New York State
- Grace Church, New York City, New York State
- Church of the Advocate, Philadelphia, Pennsylvania
- First Presbyterian Church, Pittsburgh, Pennsylvania
- Trinity Church, Newport, Rhode Island
- United Church of Christ, Yankton, South Dakota

== See also ==
=== Other related 19th-century firms ===
- Heaton, Butler and Bayne
- Lavers, Barraud and Westlake
- Burlison and Grylls
- Hardman & Co.
- James Powell and Sons
- Charles Eamer Kempe
- John Loughborough Pearson
- Augustus Welby Pugin

=== Context ===
- Poor Man's Bible
- University of Sydney
