= Seaton, Cornwall =

Village in Cornwall, England

Coordinates: 50.3648°N 4.3851°W

Seaton: Cornish: Sethyn
- Location within Cornwall
- OS grid reference: SX304544
- Civil parish: Deviock
- Shire county: Cornwall
- Region: South West
- Country: England
- Sovereign state: United Kingdom
- Post town: TORPOINT
- Postcode district: PL11
- Dialling code: 01503
- Police: Devon and Cornwall
- Fire: Cornwall
- Ambulance: South Western
- UK Parliament: South East Cornwall

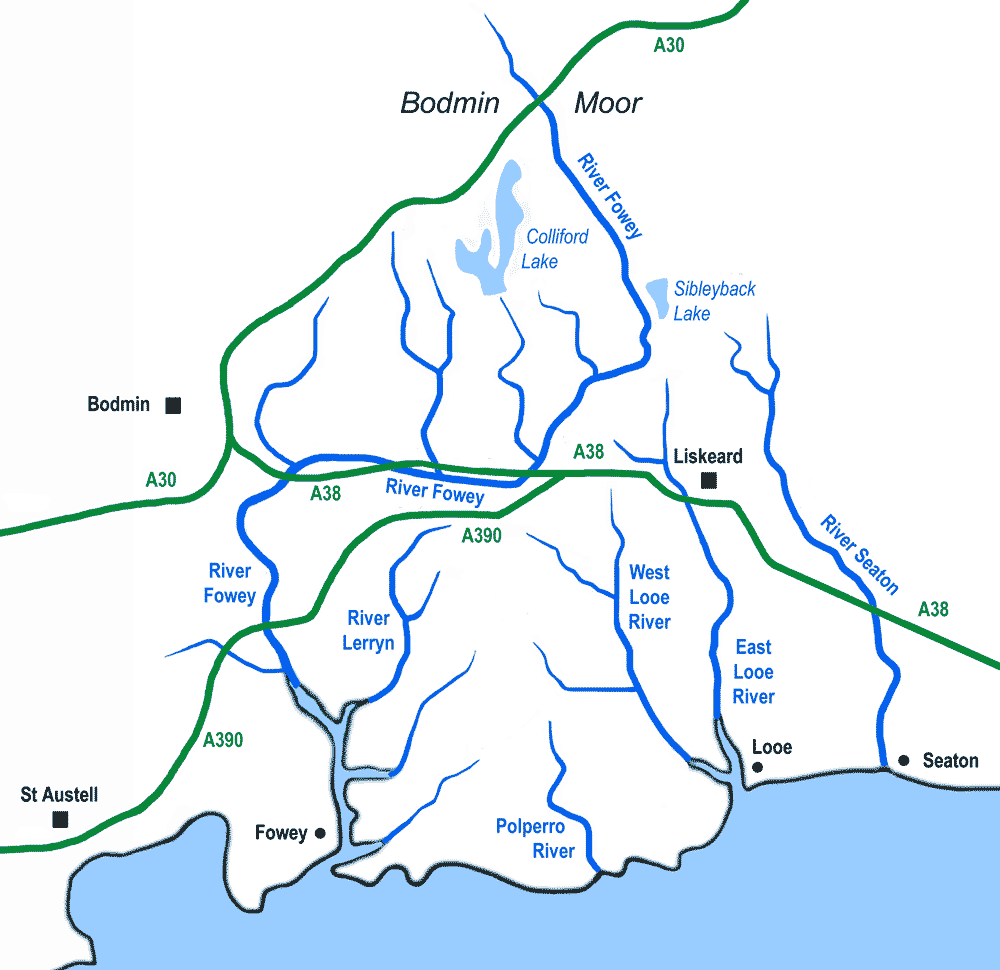
Sketchmap of the River Seaton and neighbouring rivers in Cornwall

Seaton (Cornish: Sethyn, meaning little arrow, after the river on which it lies) is a village on the south coast of Cornwall, England, at the mouth of the River Seaton 3.8 miles (6.1 km) east of Looe and ten miles (16 km) west of Plymouth. The village is in the civil parish of Deviock.

The village stretches inland along the River Seaton valley. It has two pubs, a beach café. Seaton beach is mostly shingle and stretches from the river to the village of Downderry a mile to the east.

Seaton Valley Countryside Park, one of four Country Parks in Cornwall, is immediately to the north of the village. The park includes a nature trail that can be followed for nearly two miles north to Hessenford.

A Monkey Sanctuary with a colony of woolly monkeys and other rescued primates is two miles to the west.

A station was to be built at Seaton as part of the proposed St Germans & Looe Railway in the late 1930s, but the railway was abandoned without the station having been built.

== Gallery ==
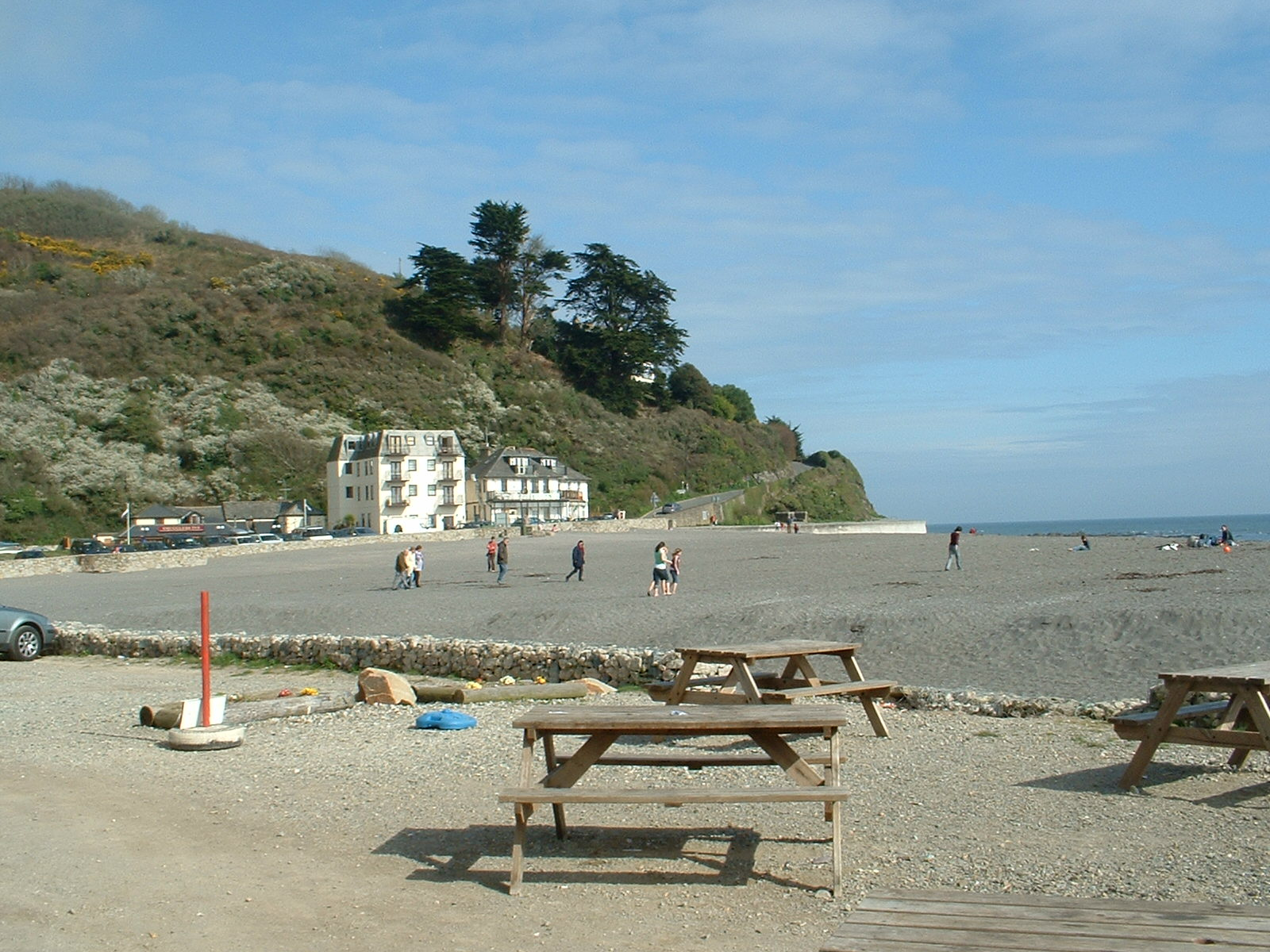
Seaton beach

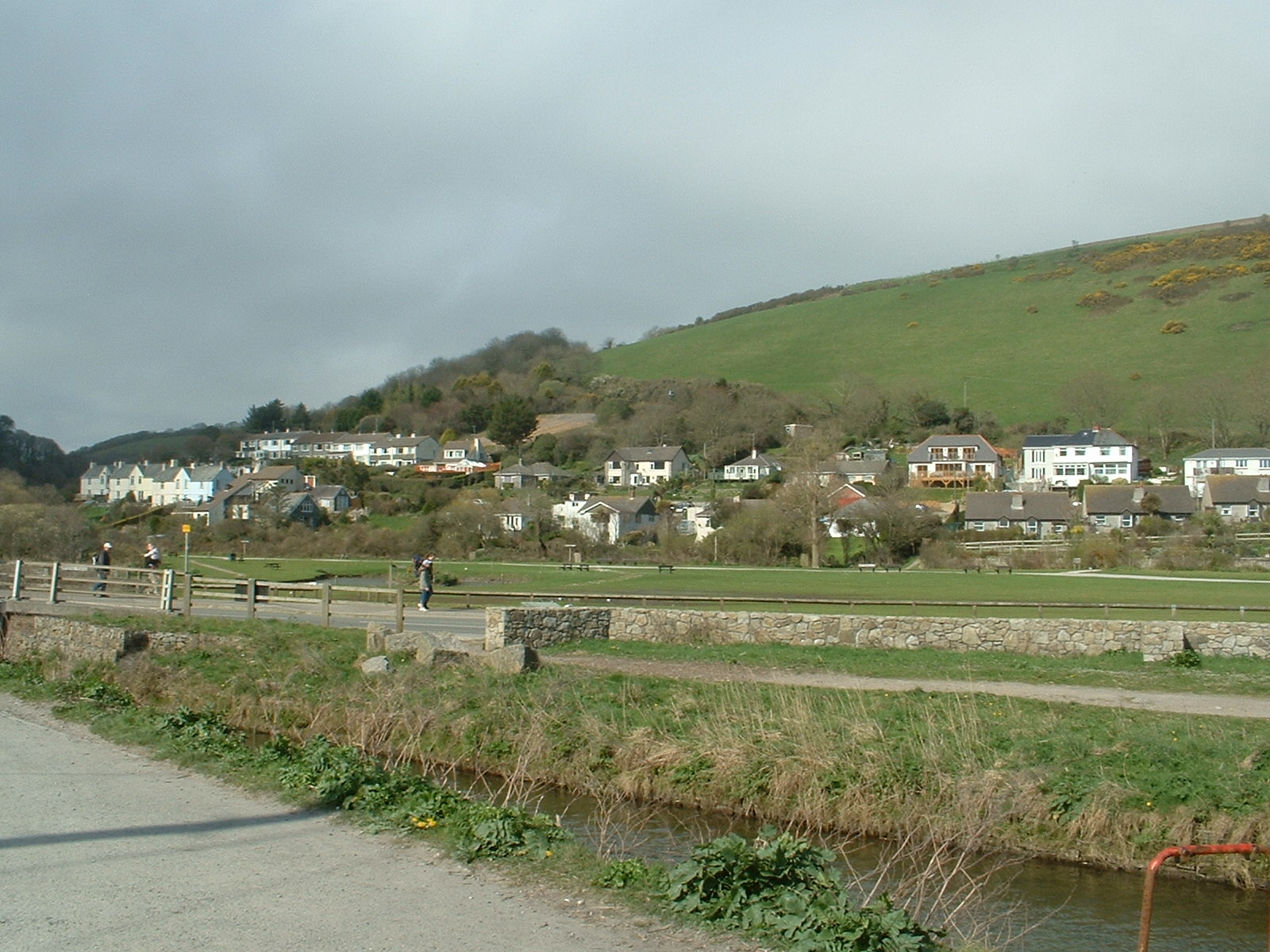
The Seaton valley

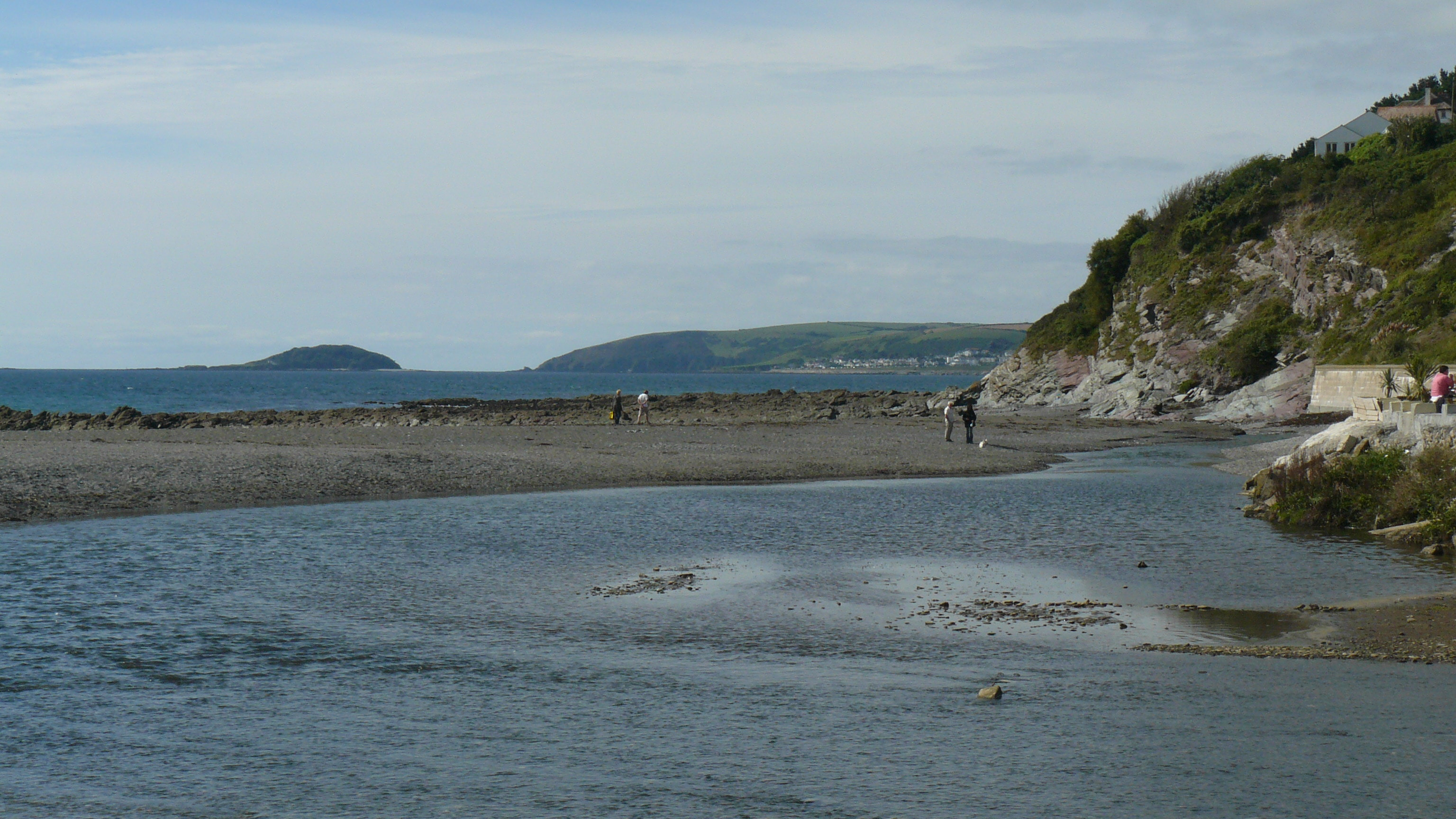
The River Seaton meets the sea

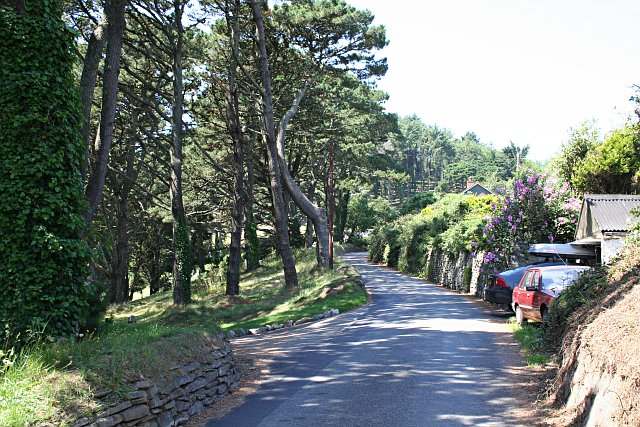
A minor road west of Seaton

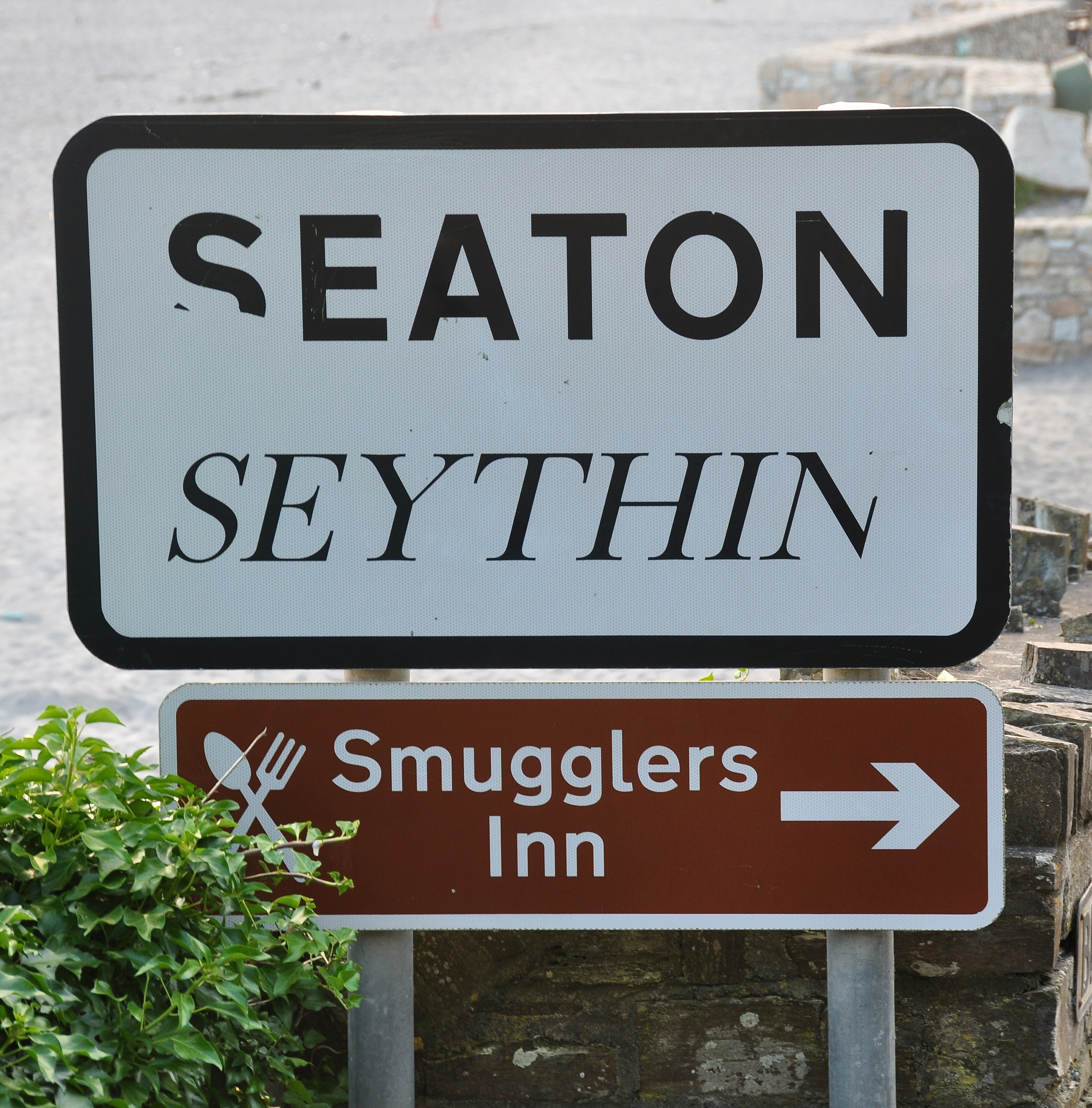
A bilingual road sign with Seaton in English and Seythin in Cornish.
