= River Seaton =

River in east Cornwall, England

Coordinates: 50°21′49″N 4°23′16″W

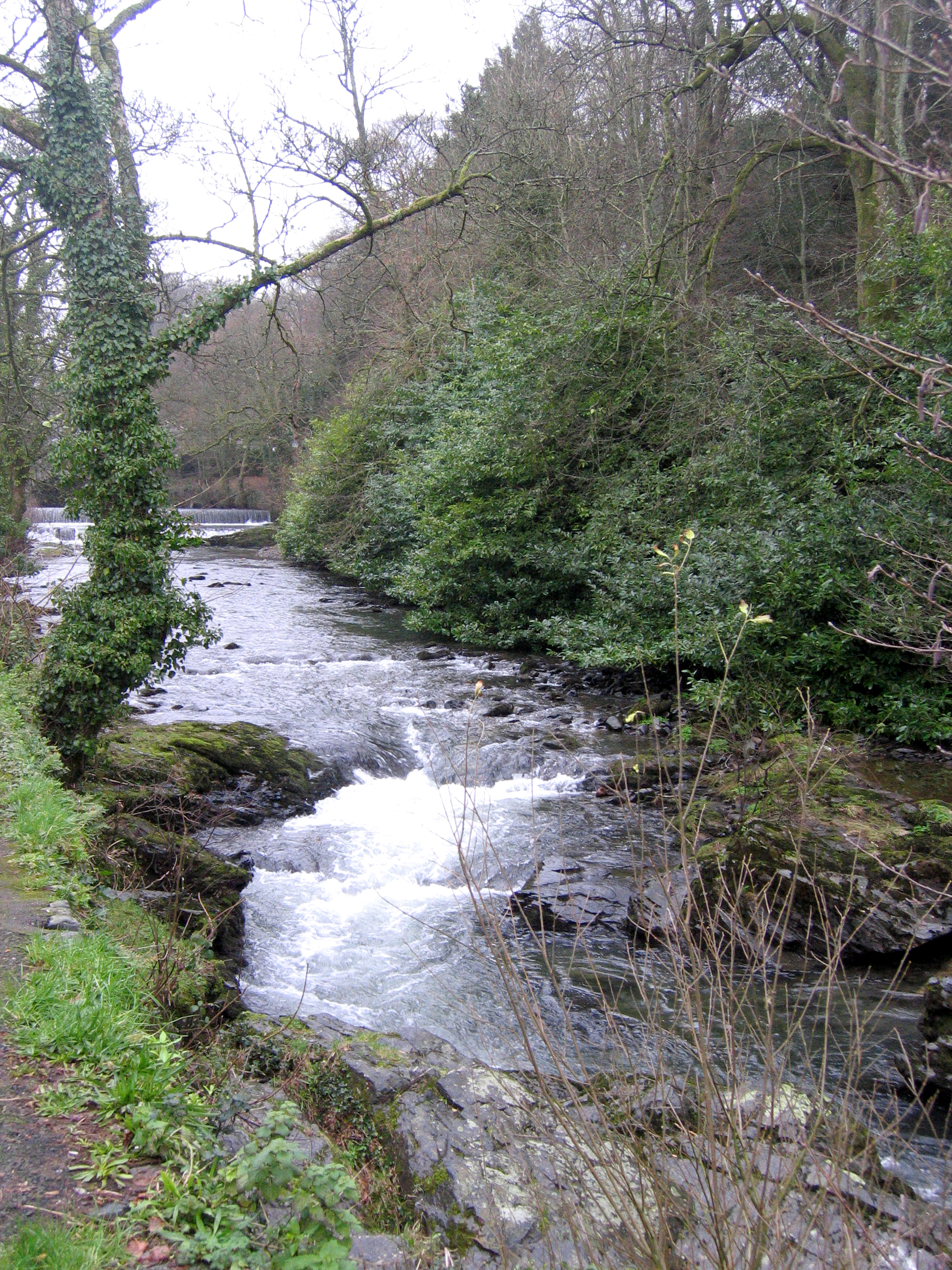
- The River Seaton, Hessenford

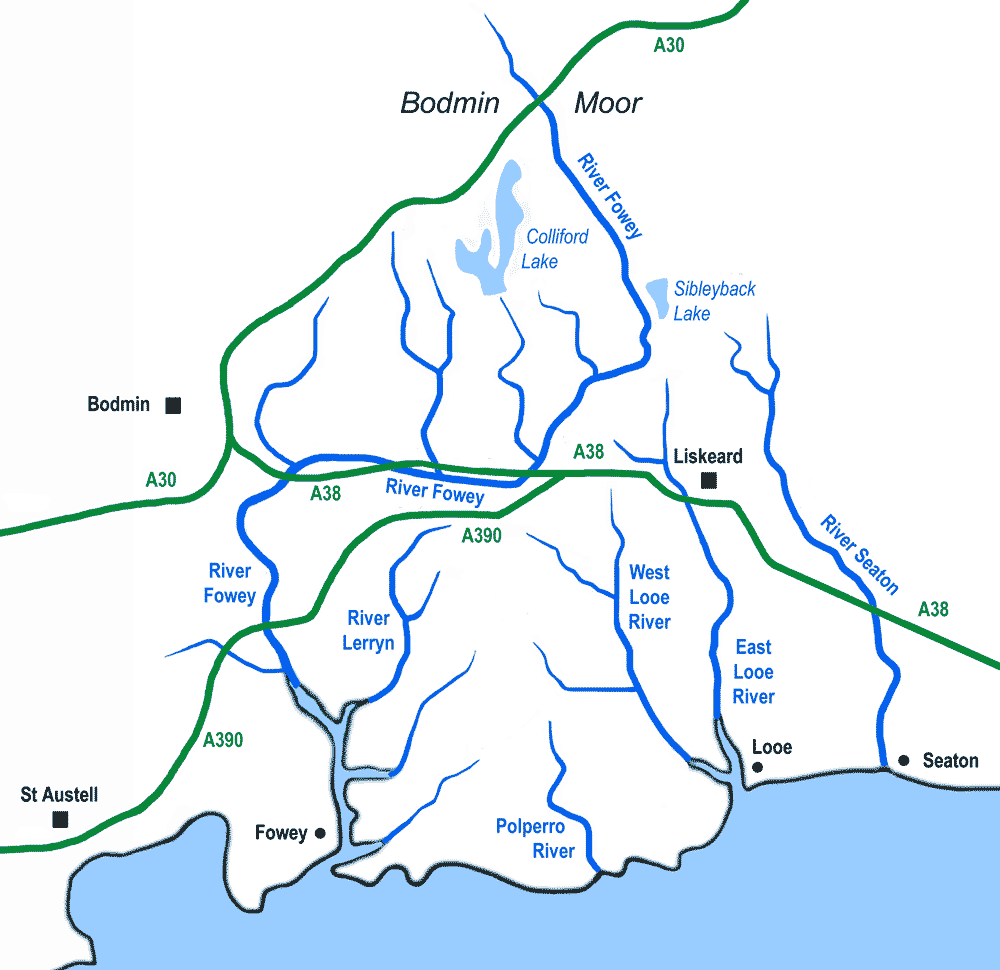
- Rivers south of Bodmin Moor

Physical characteristics
- Source
  - elevation: 1,214 feet (370 m)
- Length: 11 miles (17 km)

The River Seaton is a river in east Cornwall, England, UK which flows southwards for 11 miles (17 km) into the English Channel.

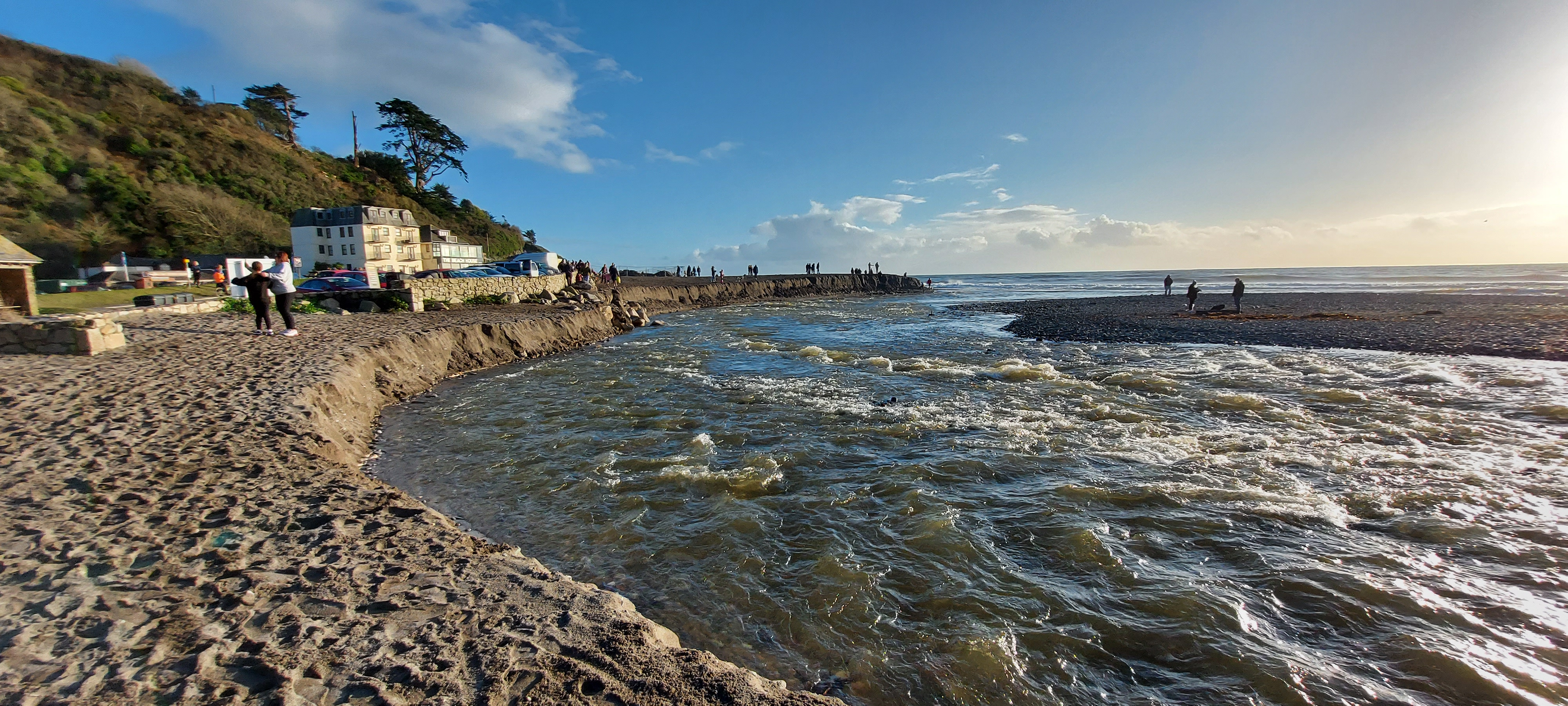
The mouth of the river after heavy rainfall from Storm Bella eroded part of the beach

The river rises near Caradon Hill and flows generally south past Darite, Menheniot and Hessenford and a few miles further south into the sea at Seaton Beach, west of Downderry. The river has been dug into channels in its lower reaches which has sped the flow of the water up and straightened the curves out. Additionally, because of the mining history around Bodmin Moor, the water is polluted with traces of aluminium and copper; both these effects have led to smaller populations of wildlife inhabiting the river.

There is an early record of the river as "Seythyn" in 1302; the name means "little arrow river".

== See also ==
- Seaton Valley Countryside Park
