= Looe (disambiguation) =

Looe is a town in Cornwall, England, UK.

Looe may also refer to:

== Geography ==
- Liskeard and Looe Union Canal
- Looe Island
- River Looe
- Looe Key

== Other fields ==
- East Looe (UK Parliament constituency), constituency represented in the House of Commons of the Parliament of the United Kingdom
- Looe railway station, the terminus of a branch line from Liskeard railway station
- Looe high-level railway station, the terminus of the proposed but abandoned St Germans & Looe Railway
- Looe Valley Line, railway line from Liskeard to Looe in Cornwall, UK
- West Looe (UK Parliament constituency), constituency represented in the House of Commons of the Parliament of the United Kingdom
- HMS Looe, the name of six ships of the Royal Navy and one planned one
