= Millendreath railway station =

Proposed railway station in Cornwall

Millendreath railway station was a proposed railway station in Millendreath, Cornwall which would have formed one of four stations on the St Germans & Looe Railway. The railway was proposed in 1935 and authorised by the Great Western Railway (Additional Powers) Act 1936 (c. ci), and work commenced in 1937. By the time that war began in 1939 only a small amount of work had been completed, and it was abandoned. Millendreath station itself was unbuilt, although the adjacent golf course was constructed but subsequently abandoned.
