= St Anne's Church, Hessenford =

Church in Cornwall, England

Coordinates: 50°23′34″N 4°22′56″W

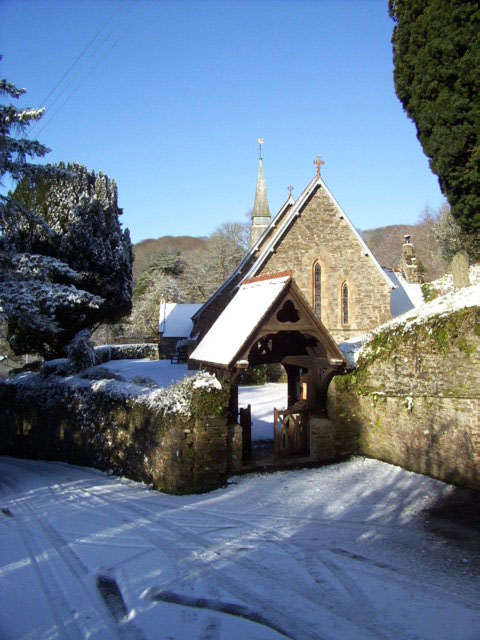
St Anne's Church, Hessenford

St Anne's Church is a former Church of England parish church in the village of Hessenford in Cornwall. It is dedicated to St Anne, the mother of the Virgin Mary. The church is in the Archdeaconry of Bodmin, in the Diocese of Truro. The church is largely the work of J P St Aubyn, and is Grade II listed.

== History ==
Although there has been a village at Hessenford since at least 1286 (when a mill is recorded), the earliest reference to a church is from 1539 when, following the dissolution, it was sold for eight shillings sixpence. This was a chapel, dedicated to St Anne, of St German's Priory, and probably built in the 15th century. As late as 1914 it was recorded that remains of the 'ancient chapel' were still visible in Hessenford Wood.

The church was built as a chapel-of-ease to St Germans parish church in 1832 to support the growing population of Hessenford. It was consecrated the following year. Although there is a small tower and spire, there has never been a bell, and the church became renowned for its shotgun weddings as a volley was fired in place of a peal. A newspaper report in 1930 pictured local farmers firing a salute of one hundred rounds in celebration of a wedding. The church became a separate parish in 1851, with the Rev John Turner Fisher as the first Vicar.

The chancel was the first extension, in 1855, by the Countess of St Germans (erroneously referred to in the parish history and in Kelly's Directory as Lady Cornwallis, her name at birth having been Lady Jemima Cornwallis), in an Early English style. The chancel includes a double sedilia. In 1871 Fisher had the rest of the church rebuilt, also in an Early English style, by J P St Aubyn. The church is built of slatestone rubble with limestone dressings.

Fisher was also responsible for the construction of the mission chapel in Downderry, now St Nicolas's Church.

The church is Grade II listed.

The parish was merged back in with that of St Germans in 1984.

== Features ==
=== Stained glass ===
All of the stained glass is the work of the renowned glassmakers Clayton and Bell. The east window depicts Christ in Majesty over St Michael, and the Archangels Gabriel and Raphael. It was given in memory of the Revd Edward Golding in 1891. The remaining stained glass in the chancel was installed in 1901 in memory of Sir Charles Watson-Copley Bt and depicts Anna the Prophetess the Blessed Virgin Mary and St Elizabeth, the mother of St John the Baptist.

There are three windows in the south aisle. Installed in 1894 and dedicated to the memory of Sir Charles and Lady (Georgina) Watson-Copley, they depict Abraham (Faith): the Centurion, David (Hope): St Paul and St Joseph (Charity): St John the Evangelist.

The west window was the first to be installed, in 1880, during Fisher's incumbency. It depicts the Resurrection above a roundel of the prophet Isiah, the Crucifixion above the Last Supper, and the Ascension above a roundel of St John the Baptist. It is dedicated to the memory of Mrs Frances Abraham, Fisher's mother-in-law. The two west aisle windows are both dedicated to the memory of the Revd John Turner Fisher: that on the south depicts Solomon and the building of the Temple and that on the north depicts the Good Samaritan.

=== Other features ===
The pulpit is made of Caen stone and alabaster, and was the work of the Exeter sculptor Harry Hems. It was erected to the memory of the Revd H N Wheeler (Vicar, 1886–1902) in 1904. The reredos is also the work of Hems: it depicts, in the central panel, the Crucifixion with the Blessed Virgin, St John and St Mary Magdalene at the foot of the Cross. The northern panel depicts Christ carrying the Cross and the southern panel depicts the Resurrection being witnessed by the Roman soldiers guarding the tomb.

The organ was obtained by public subscription in 1901. Originally blown by hand, in 1939 it was converted to an electric blower. The National Pipe Organ Register describes it as an undated Casson, although given the date of its installation (1901) it is likely to be the work of Casson's Positive Organ Company. It is located in the north aisle, and the north vestry is used as the organ chamber.

The lectern is of carved oak and depicts St Joseph. It was the work of Jack Sandy, a local craftsman.

The aumbry on the north wall of the chancel was a later installation, in 1966, although is no longer in use, the key having been lost.

There is a lych gate, which was installed in 1905.

== Churchyard ==
There is an adjacent churchyard, which contains two war graves from the First World War and one from the Second World War. The churchyard is home to two very rare bee species: Andrena bucephala, a mining bee, and Nomada hirtipes, a solitary bee.

== Incumbents ==
- James William Campbell, 1834–35.
- Charles Vaughan, 1836–42.
- Edward Golding, 1843–51.
- John Turner Fisher, 1851–85. Fisher is buried in the churchyard.
- Horace Newman Wheeler, 1886–1902. Wheeler is buried in the churchyard.
- Ralph Cecil Purton, 1903–19.
- William George Henry Ward, 1919–24. Ward was the father of the actor Michael Ward.
- Leonard Alfred Williams, 1924–32. Williams was the son of Sir Frederick Williams, Bt, and, at the time of his death in 1956, was his nephew's heir presumptive to the baronetcy.
- Lancelot Wilkinson, 1933-36
- James Dawson Wray Dawson, 1936–47.
- Richard Bertram Seccombe, 1947-? .
- Dudley North Henchy, 1949–55.
- ?, 1955–66.
- Frederick Ronald Harwood, 1966–71.
- Malcolm Senior Byrom, 1972–77. Byrom was subsequently the last Warden of the Community of the Epiphany.
- John Duncan Ferguson, 1977–84.
- Richard Edward Buller Maynard, 1984–85.
- Stephen Coffin, 1986–2000.
- Alexander Irvine Johnston, 2001–12.
- Michael Eric Goodland, 2012–17.
- Lynn Parker, since 2019.
