= Millendreath =

Hamlet in Cornwall, England

Coordinates: 50°21′46″N 4°26′12″W

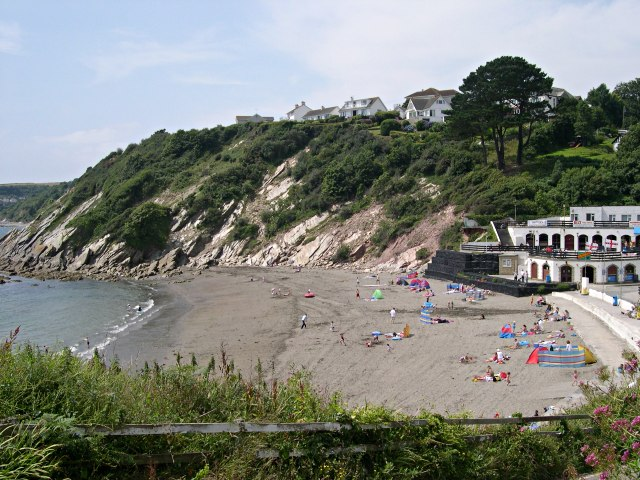
Millendreath Beach

Millendreath (Cornish: Melindreth) is a hamlet in the parish of St Martin-by-Looe, Cornwall, England, situated two miles east of the town of Looe.

A station was to be built at Millendreath as part of the proposed St Germans & Looe Railway in the late 1930s, but the railway was abandoned without the station having been built. An associated golf course was constructed, but it was abandoned on the outbreak of war.
