= St Germans and Looe Railway =

Proposed railway line in Cornwall

The St Germans & Looe Railway was a proposed new railway in Cornwall by the Great Western Railway, providing a direct connection between St Germans and Looe. The railway was proposed in 1935 and authorised in 1936, and work commenced in 1937. By the time that war began in 1939 only a small amount of work had been completed, and it was abandoned. Had the railway been completed, it would have involved the construction of four stations, three tunnels and two viaducts.

== The Liskeard and Looe Railway ==
What became the Liskeard and Looe Railway opened in 1860, initially between Moorswater, to the west of Liskeard, and Looe, as a freight line. It opened to passenger traffic in 1879. In 1901 it was extended to Liskeard. Due to the sharp curve between Coombe Junction and Liskeard it was not possible to run through trains, or even through carriages, further up the main line towards St Germans and Plymouth. It was the desire to run through trains, as well as to open up coastal resorts to the east of Looe, that led to the proposal for the St Germans & Looe Railway.

== The proposed railway ==
Although there are records that the proposed railway was to commence at a new junction at Trerulefoot, 1 3/4 miles (2.8 km) west of St Germans although GWR plans indicate that the junction was 3 chains (60 m) west of Crift Lane Bridge and 6 chains (120 m) east of milepost 257 3/4. From there it was to travel south west to join the Seaton Valley north of Hessenford, and then follow the River Seaton south for two miles to Seaton, and thereafter follow the coast westwards to Looe, where a high-level station was to be built. The total length of the railway was seven miles, half the distance of the route via Liskeard. Rolling stock was to be diesel railcars.

The route was to be as follows:

- Trerule Junction: the signalbox at Trerule opened in 1938 but, as a result of abandonment of the railway, it never had more than 6 levers; it was replaced by colour light IBS signals in the 1950s.
- Hessenford Tunnel: 1 mile (1.6 km)
- Hessenford railway station
- Keveral viaduct: 144 ft (44 m) high, eleven 70 ft (21 m) spans and two 35 ft (11 m) spans
- Seaton railway station
- Seaton tunnel: 1 mile 528 yards (2.092 km)
- Millendreath railway station: located 123 ft (37 m) above Chubb's Mill
- Millendreath viaduct: nine 70 ft (21 m) spans and three 35 ft (11 m) spans
- Looe tunnel: 700 yds
- Looe high-level railway station

The railway was authorised by the Great Western Railway (Additional Powers) Act 1936 (c. 101), amended by the Great Western Railway Act 1937 (c. 30). Work began on the coastal section in 1937 and the signalbox at Trerule was opened in 1938, but all other work was curtailed by the start of war in 1939.

== Funding and associated development ==
The project was to be funded under the Government's Guaranteed Loans Scheme legislation. There was an associated scheme for extensive residential, leisure and resort development along the coastline by the GWR's development partner, Western Enterprises Limited. From 1935 the GWR bought up over 700 acres (280 ha) of farmland and 309 acres (125 ha) of beach. Some of this land was to be put to use as an 18-hole championship golf course (which was completed just prior to the start of war) and a 60-room luxury hotel above Millendreath to be designed by Edwin Lutyens (which was not). The principal contractors for the golf course and associated roads were Franks, Harris and Company, the leading golf course contractor of its day. The golf course was located between Millendreath and the site of what has been the Monkey Sanctuary since 1964.

The development land returned to grazing land and was sold by auction in 1954 by the Metropolitan Railway Country Estates, other than Bodigga Cliff which it donated to the National Trust in 1967.

The 1936 Authorising Act was repealed in part by the Transport Act 1962 (12th Schedule Part I), but otherwise remains extant. It was not repealed by the Statute Law (Repeals) Act 2013, Schedule 1 Part 9 of which repealed a large number of Acts authorising abortive railway projects.
