= Seaton Valley Countryside Park =

Country park in Cornwall, England

Coordinates: 50.376°N 4.388°W

The park entrance sign

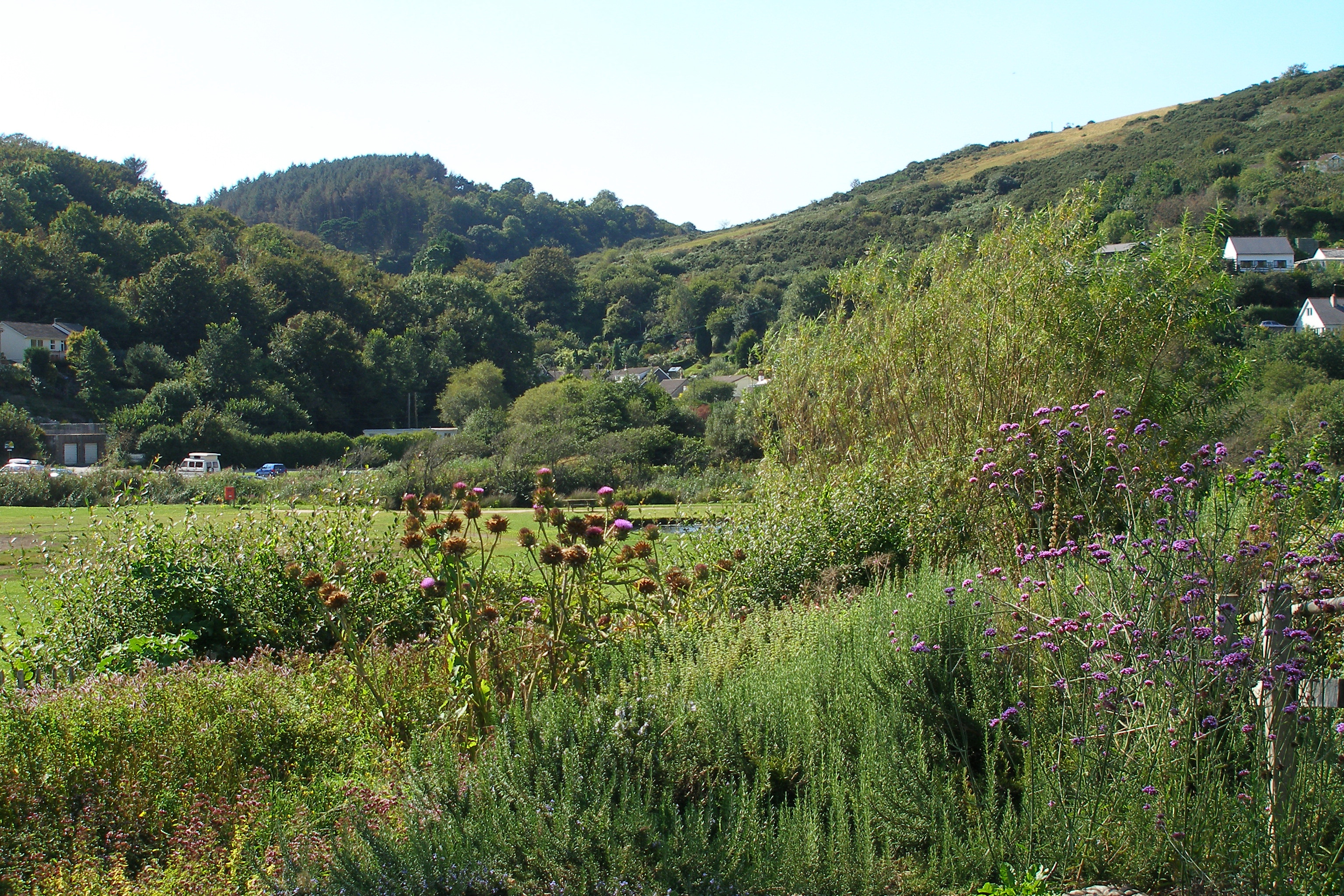
The view from sensory garden

A braille sign in the sensory garden

Seaton Valley Countryside Park is the newest of Cornwall's four Country Parks. It is situated in the Seaton valley between the villages of Seaton and Hessenford. It includes two Local Nature Reserves, Seaton Valley North and Seaton Valley South.

The park was formerly owned and managed by Caradon District Council since 1995 and it was formally opened in 1998. Today, the park is owned and managed by Cornwall Council. It covers over 50 hectares, including a sensory garden, ponds, cycleways and footpaths, with disabled access on the main footpath and to the garden. In 2005, the park became the first one in Cornwall to win a Green Flag Award.

The park provides a flat path of over a mile in length which winds its way through the valley bottom with ponds, woodlands, and picnic areas. To the south, the path leads to a beach and to the north a longer path leads through woodland to Hessenford.

Part of Seaton Valley Countryside Park occupies the site of a derelict caravan park.
