= Looe high-level railway station =

Proposed railway station in Cornwall

Looe high-level railway station was a proposed railway station in Looe, Cornwall which would have formed one of four stations on the St Germans & Looe Railway. Looe was to be the terminus station; it was to be set at a higher-level than the existing Looe railway station on the Liskeard and Looe Railway. The railway was proposed in 1935 and authorised by the Great Western Railway (Additional Powers) Act 1936 (c. ci), and work commenced in 1937. By the time that war began in 1939 only a small amount of work had been completed, and it was abandoned. Looe station itself was unbuilt.
