= Hessenford =

Village in Cornwall, England

Coordinates: 50.391°N 4.384°W

Hessenford: Cornish: Rys an Gwraghes
- Location within Cornwall
- Population: 170
- OS grid reference: SX307573
- Civil parish: United parishes of St Germans, Hessenford, Downderry and Tideford
- Shire county: Cornwall
- Region: South West
- Country: England
- Sovereign state: United Kingdom
- Post town: TORPOINT
- Postcode district: PL11
- Dialling code: 01503
- Police: Devon and Cornwall
- Fire: Cornwall
- Ambulance: South Western
- UK Parliament: South East Cornwall

Hessenford (Cornish: Rys an Gwraghes) is a small village in south-east Cornwall, United Kingdom, four miles west of St Germans on the A387 Polbathic to Polperro road. The village had a population of 170 at the 2001 census. It is in the civil parish of Deviock. The river Seaton runs through the village and a mill was recorded here in 1286; the last mill closing in the mid-20th century.

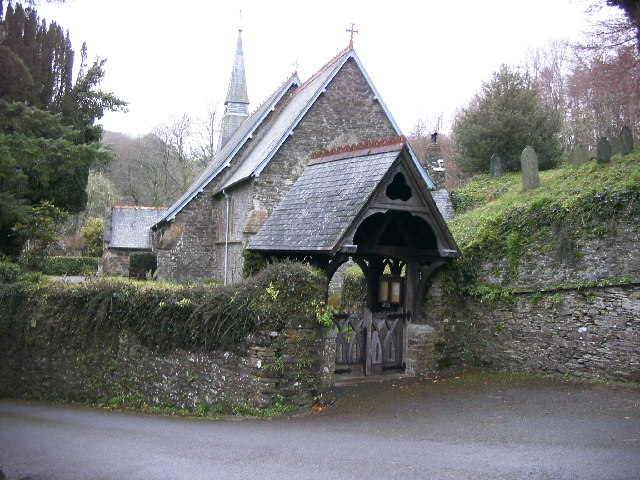
Hessenford Church

Hessenford is part of the united parishes of St Germans, Hessenford, Downderry and Tideford. St Anne's Church was built in 1832 as a chapel of ease in the parish of St Germans to serve the growing population of the village. It was built by local subscription, local labour and materials, and was dedicated on 26 September 1833, the perpetual curate being appointed by the vicar of Saint Germans. Hessenford became a parish in its own right by "Order in Council" in 1852 and in 1855 and 1871 the church was rebuilt in early English style. The lychgates, a gift, were built in 1905, the original gates being used for the entrance to the church yard.

A station was to be built at Hessenford as part of the proposed St Germans & Looe Railway in the late 1930s, but the railway was abandoned without the station having been built.

The Seaton Valley Countryside Park is to the south of the village following the river valley to the coast at Seaton.
