= Downderry =

Village in Cornwall, England

Downderry: Cornish: Downderri
- Location within Cornwall
- OS grid reference: SX315540
- Civil parish: Deviock
- Unitary authority: Cornwall
- Ceremonial county: Cornwall
- Region: South West
- Country: England
- Sovereign state: United Kingdom
- Post town: TORPOINT
- Postcode district: PL11
- Dialling code: 01503
- Police: Devon and Cornwall
- Fire: Cornwall
- Ambulance: South Western
- UK Parliament: South East Cornwall

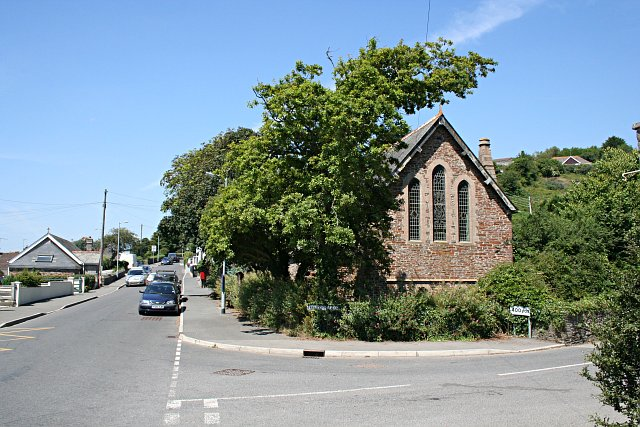
Downderry Church

Downderry (Cornish: Downderri) is a coastal village in south-east Cornwall, England, United Kingdom. It is 12 miles (19 km) west of Plymouth and one mile east of Seaton.

Downderry has a long beach of light shingle with road access to the beach via a slipway, although this is blocked by a locked gate, pedestrian access is still possible. Dogs are allowed on the beach. The beach further east is a nudist beach. (Note: Location of naturist beach near Downderry 50°21′37″N 4°20′29″W) The village has a Village Hall which opened in 1891 and hosts a variety of events and activities, a Church of England church, a Methodist chapel, a pub, a Tapas Bar, a coffee shop and a primary school. The Church of St Nicolas Downderry began as a mission church to service the growing population of the village. The building dates from the late 19th-century.

The village and beach offer views of Looe Island to the west and Rame Head to the east and on clear days the Eddystone Lighthouse 8 miles (13 km) offshore.

== Points of interest ==
=== Bass rock ===
Approximately 700 metres (770 yd) east of the village center is a rocky outcrop known locally as "Bass Rock", which is a popular fishing spot as it affords access to deeper water.

=== Coldeadon ===
About 300 metres (330 yd) further east from Bass Rock are the cliffs of Coldeadon. The promontory beyond these cliffs cuts off access to the beach at high tide.

=== The Long Stone (Shag Rock) ===
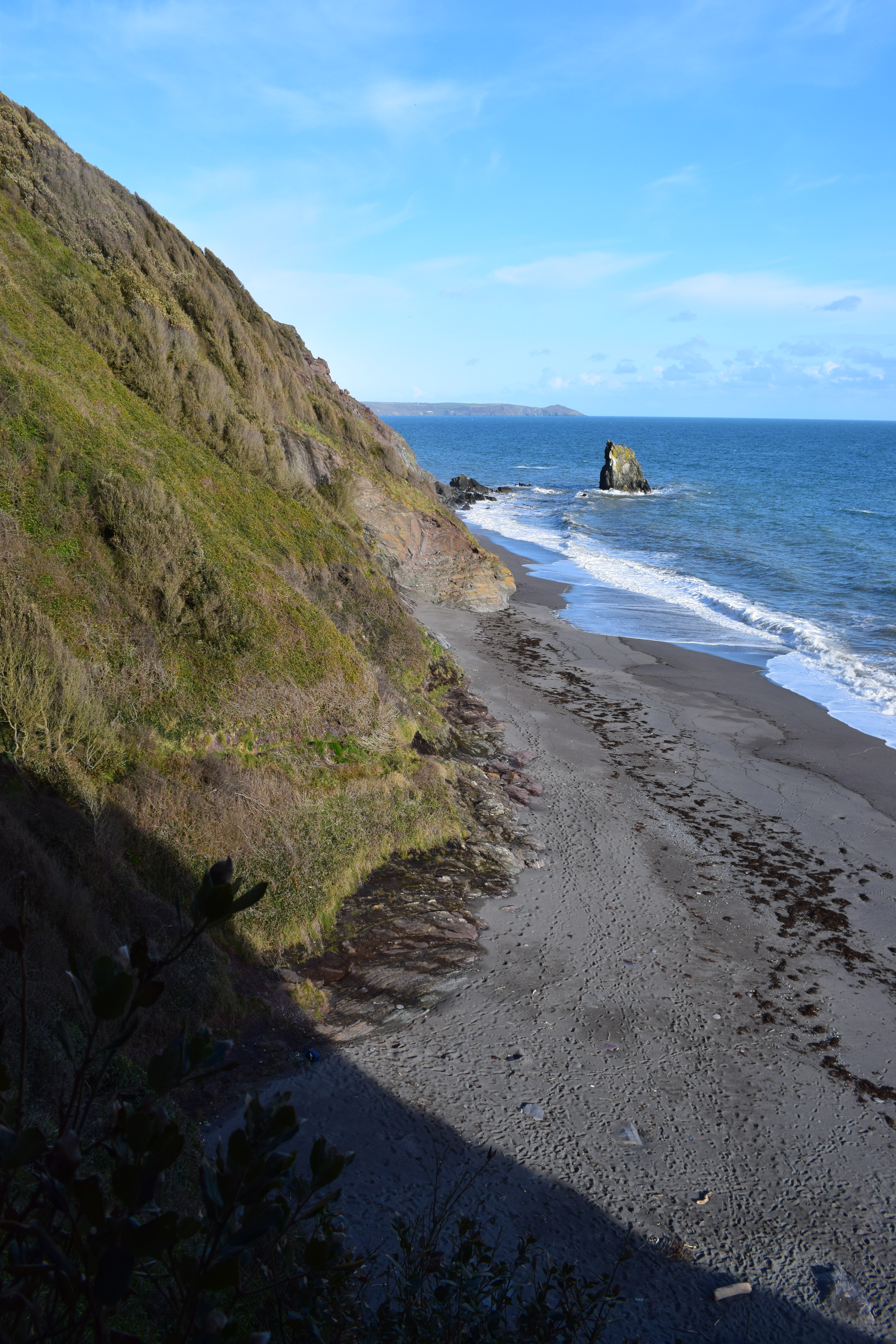
Shag Rock

Beyond Coldeadon is a 600 metres (660 yd) stretch of beach which ends at a rocky outcrop known locally as "Shag Rock", named for the seabirds that gather there to dry their wings after diving for fish. This marks the end of easy foot access along the coastline. A path up the cliff leads to the road above the beach; the ascent is pleasant but reasonably strenuous. The ruins of a Victorian lodge, known as "St Germans Hut" are located about halfway up the path.

=== Television transmitter ===
One of the hills above the village hosts a television transmitter which serves as a repeater for the surrounding area.

=== Chain Home bunkers ===
During the Second World War, Downderry was the site of a Chain Home radar installation. The remains of this facility are still present on the east side of the village. One of the bunkers has been converted into a residential garage, while the other is no longer accessible from the road because it is now on private property.

=== Neolithic earthworks ===
The only known example of a 'cursus' earthwork in Cornwall is situated behind the village in the fields near Triffle farm.

=== Wreck of the Gipsy ===
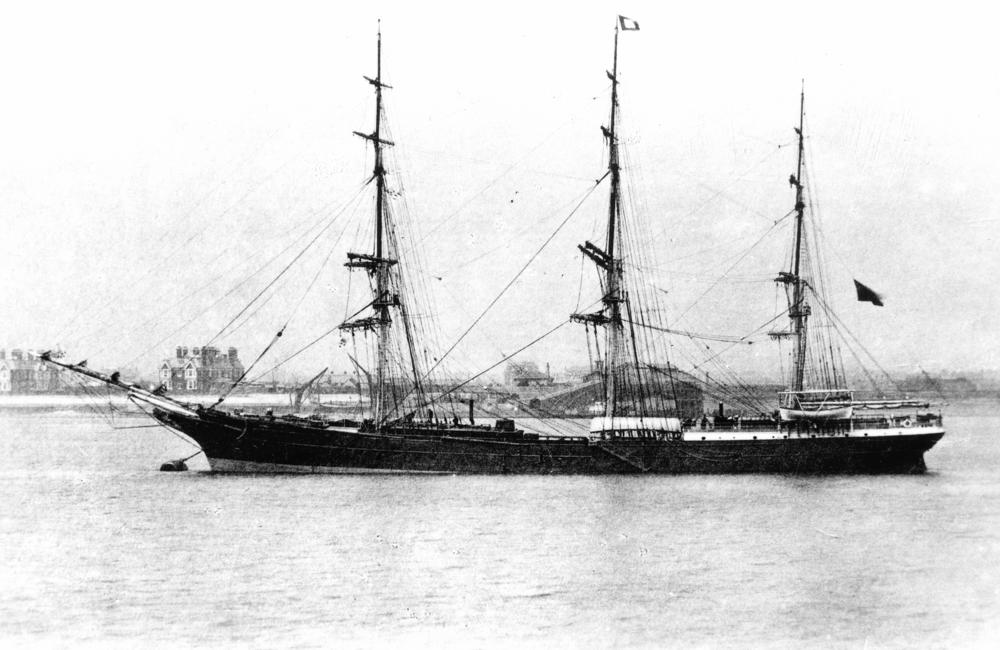
The Gypsy (Rodney) wrecked off Downderry, Cornwall.

The wreck of the Gipsy can be found just off Downderry in about 7 metres (23 ft) of water 90 metres (300 ft) west of the slipway. Originally named The Rodney she was an iron, full-rigged ship built in 1874 by W Pile & Co., Sunderland. In November 1895, Rodney lost her figurehead in a gale in the English Channel, while en route from Gravesend, Kent to Sydney. The figurehead washed ashore at Whitsand Bay, Cornwall, six months later.

In 1897, the ship was sold to F. Boissière, of Nantes, France, and renamed Gipsy (the cross-over year, per Lloyd's, is 1896/97). Re-rigged then as a barque. On 7 December 1901, the vessel was wrecked, and became a total loss, at Downderry on the return voyage from Iquique (Chile) to France with a cargo of nitrate. The 1,447 tonnes (1,424 long tons; 1,595 short tons) ship lost her bearings and became stranded on the reef and was later blown apart by explosives as she had become a hazard to local fishing vessels. Parts of the wreck are strewn over a large area in about 7 to 8 metres (23 to 26 ft) of water.

== In literature ==
Downderry! Downderry! The very name of this small Cornish seaside village has a rhythmic, lyrical quality... Downderry down, Downderry down... it rings of lymeric, folk song and rhyme. Snug between the bay of Whitsand and the promontory of Looe, Downderry with its spouse Seaton, bathes in the constant ebb and flow of the English Channel. Their gentle cliffs roll and tumble towards the sea.

— John Betjeman

A 19th-century nonsense verse,

There was an old Derry Downderry,
Who loved to make little folks merry,
So he made them a book, and with laughter they shook,
At the fun of that Derry Downderry.

— Anon,
