= Connock =

Connock is a surname. Notable people with the surname include:

- Jim Connock (1925–1991), English film editor
- John Connock (fl. 1554–1571), English politician
- Richard Connock (died c. 1620), MP
- John Connock (born 1631), English politician

== See also ==
- Connick
