= William Dolben (disambiguation) =

William Dolben was a Welsh clergyman.

William Dolben may also refer to:

- William Dolben (judge) (c. 1627–1694), English judge
- Sir William Dolben, 3rd Baronet (1727–1814), British MP and campaigner for the abolition of slavery
- William H. Dolben (1878–1948), American politician in Massachusetts

== See also ==
- Dolben (surname)
