= Henry Pyne =

Henry Pyne may refer to:

- Henry Pyne (MP for Liskeard) (1504/5–1556 or later), member of English Parliament
- Henry Pyne (MP for Dungarvan) (before 1688–1713), member of Irish Parliament

== See also ==
- William Henry Pyne (1796–1843), artist
- Henry's pine, species of conifer
