= Dolben =

Dolben is a surname. Notable people with the surname include:

- John Dolben (1625–1686), English priest
- John Dolben (1662 – 1710), East India judge-advocate
- William Dolben (c. 1588–1631), Welsh priest
- Dolben baronets, from 1704 to 1837
