= Paul Wentworth =

16th-century English politician

The Honourable Paul Wentworth
- Arms of Wentworth: Sable, a chevron between three leopard's faces or

Member of Parliament for Chipping Wycombe
- In office 1559–1559
- Preceded by: Thomas Pymme
- Succeeded by: Thomas Fermore

Member of Parliament for Buckingham
- In office 1563–1567
- Preceded by: William Riseley
- Succeeded by: Thomas Wenman

Member of Parliament for Liskeard
- In office 1572–1583
- Preceded by: John Connock
- Succeeded by: Edward Denny

Personal details
- Born: 1534
- Died: 13 January 1594 (aged 59–60)
- Resting place: St Peter's Church, Burnham; 51.5328°N 0.659823°W
- Spouse: Helen Agmondesham (m. 1563)
- Children: Francis Wentworth; Paul Wentworth; Peter Wentworth; William Wentworth; Anne Wentworth; Helen Wentworth; Elizabeth Wentworth; Mary Wentworth
- Parents: Sir Nicholas Wentworth; Jane Josselyn

Paul Wentworth (1534 – 13 January 1594), of Burnham, Buckinghamshire, was an English politician who sat in the House of Commons from 1559 to 1583 in the reign of Elizabeth I. He was elected MP for the seat of Chipping Wycombe in 1559, Buckingham in 1563 and Liskeard in 1572. He was a member of the Lillingstone Lovell branch of the family.

== Life ==
He was born in 1534, the 3rd son of Sir Nicholas Wentworth (d. 1557) of Lillingstone Lovell, Oxfordshire and Jane Josselyn (d. 1569), daughter of John Josselyn of Hyde Hall, Sawbridgeworth, Hertfordshire. His father was chief porter of Calais.

=== Marriage and issue ===
He married, on 26 November 1563, Helen Agmondesham, daughter of Richard Agmondesham of Heston, Middlesex, widow of William Tyldesley, Groom of the Chamber. By Helen he had 4 sons and 4 daughters:

- Francis Wentworth, baptised at Burnham 3 October ?1566, and buried there in his infancy.
- Paul Wentworth, baptised 9 February 1569.
- Peter Wentworth, baptised 25 April 1574.
- William Wentworth, baptised 22 January 1577, and living in 1615 with 2 sons and 2 daughters:
  - John Wentworth
  - Winsor Wentworth
  - Mary Wentworth
  - Margaret Wentworth
- Anne Wentworth, (baptised 16 September 1565 – October 1591), married Norton Knatchbull (d. 1636), of Mersham Hatch, Kent, who survived her and remarried twice. She was buried at Burnham on 19 October 1591.
- Helen Wentworth, married William Day, Esq.
- Elizabeth Wentworth, married Robert Woodford, Esq.
- Mary Wentworth, married — Barrow, and had a daughter:
  - Mary Barrow

Paul Wentworth was of Puritan sympathies, and he first came into notice by the freedom with which in 1566 he criticized Elizabeth's prohibition of discussion in parliament on the question of her successor.

Paul was probably the author of the famous puritan devotional book The Miscellanie, or Regestrie and Methodicall Directorie of Orizons (London, 1615). He became possessed of Burnham Abbey through his wife, to whose first husband, William Tyldesley, it had been granted at the dissolution of the monasteries by Henry VIII.

His brother Peter Wentworth (d. 1597) was also a prominent Puritan. The significance of both Paul and Peter Wentworth has in the past been exaggerated. In reality, although they did contend for freedom of speech (for which they were both imprisoned), neither had any impact. Graves refers to them as "standard bearers without an army" as they had no significant following, ignoring the fact that they were part of a social movement. Graves denies the significance of Wentworth's speech on the Monday following the Queen's Saturday 9 November 1566 order to end discussion on a topic, which has been quoted for over four centuries. On the Monday following, Wentworth, who as far as is known had not previously intervened, asked ″whether the Queen's commandment was not against the liberties″ of the House and presented three foundational ″questions″ that led to enhancement of the freedom of speech within parliament, amongst peers and later across society.

== Death ==
He died on 13 January 1594, and was buried in the parish church at Burnham, where ″as he lived most Christian-like, so he died most comfortably strong in faith, steadfast in hope, fervent in love, a zealous professor of the truth, and an earnest detester of all superstition″. His eldest son, Paul, was of age by August 1594, when an inquisition post mortem was taken. In his will dated 7 September 1593, he required that his widow, ″the sole executrix and residuary legatee″, supervise the upbringing of their children, with the assistance of six of his friends. His widow survived him by about 20 years. Her will, dated 24 August, was proved on 8 November 1615.
