= William Killigrew (Chamberlain of the Exchequer) =

English courtier (died 1622)

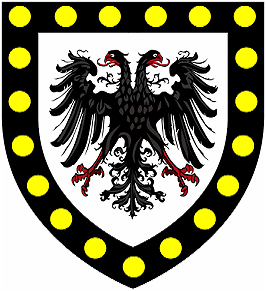
Modern arms of Killigrew: Argent, an eagle displayed with two heads sable a bordure of the second bezantée. The bezantée bordure indicates a connection to the ancient Earls of Cornwall

Sir William Killigrew (died 1622) of Hanworth, Middlesex, was a courtier to Queen Elizabeth I and to her successor King James I, whom he served as Groom of the Privy Chamber. He served as a member of parliament at various times between 1571 and 1614 and was Chamberlain of the Exchequer between 1605 and 1608. Several of his descendants were also royal courtiers and many were buried in Westminster Abbey.

== Origins ==
Killigrew was the fifth son of John III Killigrew (died 1567) of Arwenack, Cornwall, the first Governor of Pendennis Castle, situated on land within the Arwenack estate, appointed by King Henry VIII. His mother was Elizabeth Trewinnard, 2nd daughter of James Trewennard of Trewennard, in the parish of St Erth, Cornwall. The monumental brass of John III Killigrew survives in St Budock's Church, near Arwenack.

== Career ==
=== Under Queen Elizabeth I ===
In 1571 he was elected Member of Parliament for Grantham in Lincolnshire and in 1572 he was elected MP for Helston in Cornwall. He became feodary and escheator for the Duchy of Cornwall and Constable of Launceston Castle in 1576 by which year he was Groom of the Privy Chamber to Queen Elizabeth I. In 1578 he was farmer of the profits from seals in the Court of Queen's Bench and the Court of Common Pleas. He was commissioner for musters for Cornwall by 1582 and was a Justice of the Peace for Cornwall from 1583 to 1587. In 1584 he was elected MP for the Killigrew pocket borough of Penryn. He was receiver for Devon and Cornwall by 1588 and was commissioner for goods from Madre de Dios in 1592. In 1593 he was elected MP for Fowey in Cornwall. He was commissioner acting treasurer of the chamber in 1595 and commissioner for goods from Cádiz in 1596. In 1597 he was elected MP for the prestigious county seat, Cornwall.

=== Under King James I ===
He was knighted in 1603 on the succession of King James I. In 1604 he became MP for Liskeard. From 1605 to 1608 he was Chamberlain of the Exchequer. In 1614 he was elected MP for Penryn again.

== Marriage and progeny ==
At some time about 1576 Killigrew married Margaret Saunders, daughter of Thomas Saunders of Uxbridge, Middlesex, and widow of Robert Woolman and of John Leigh. By his wife he had the following progeny:

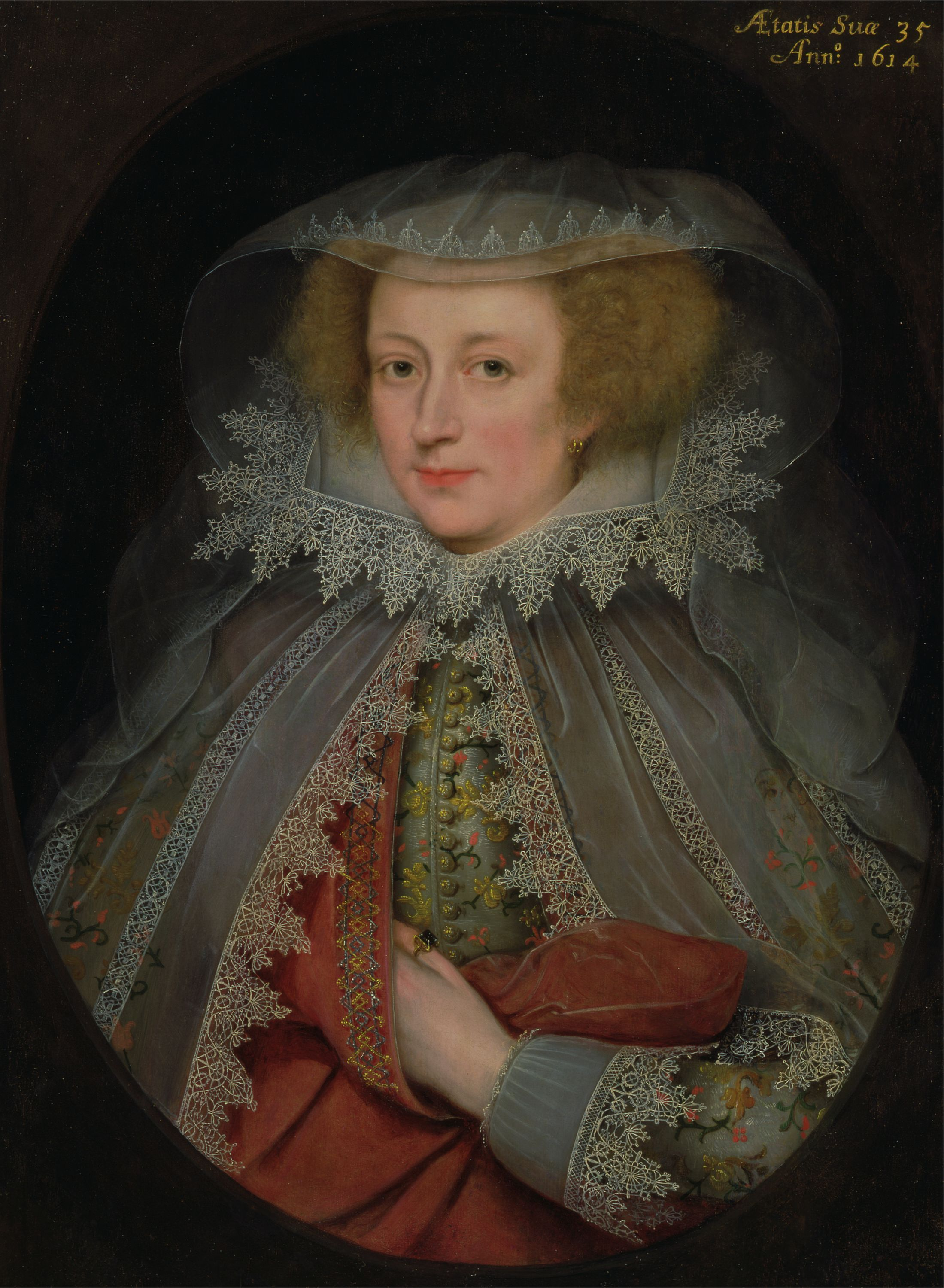
Catherine Killigrew (born 1579) (Lady Jermyn), at age 35, daughter of Sir William Killigrew and wife of Sir Thomas Jermyn (died 1645). 1614 Portrait by Marcus Gheeraerts the Younger (1561–1636), Yale Center for British Art, Connecticut

- Sir Robert Killigrew (1580–1633) of Hanworth, Middlesex, MP and Vice-Chamberlain to Queen Henrietta Maria.
- Elizabeth Killigrew, eldest daughter, wife of Sir Maurice Berkeley (c. 1577–1617), MP, of Bruton Abbey, Somerset.
- Catherine Killigrew (born 1579), wife of Sir Thomas Jermyn (died 1645) of Suffolk, MP, and mother of Henry Jermyn, 1st Earl of Saint Albans, KG, (1605–1684). Her portrait by Marcus Gheeraerts the Younger (1561–1636) survives in the collection of the Yale Center for British Art, Connecticut, USA.

== Landholdings ==
In 1594 he obtained an 80-year lease of the two adjoining royal manors of Kempton and Hanworth in Middlesex. In 1631 his son Sir Robert Killigrew (1580–1633) secured the reversion and in 1651 the latter's son Sir William Killigrew (1606–1695), "of Kempton Park", conveyed Kempton to John Warburton.

== Death and burial ==
Killigrew died in 1622 and was buried in St. Margaret's Church, Lothbury, in the City of London, near his brother Henry Killigrew.

Parliament of England
Preceded by Roger Manners; William Cooke	Member of Parliament for Grantham; 1571; With: Arthur Hall	Succeeded by John Vaughan; Arthur Hall
Preceded by Sir Edward Bray; John Gayer	Member of Parliament for Helston; 1572; With: John Vyvyan	Succeeded by Humphrey Prideaux; William Lewis
Preceded by John Killigrew; Robert Peter	Member of Parliament for Penryn; 1584; With: John Killigrew	Succeeded by John Killigrew; William Onslow
Preceded by John Rashleigh	Member of Parliament for Fowey; 1593; With: Samuel Lennard	Succeeded by John Rashleigh; Thomas Treffry
Preceded by Peter Edgcumbe; William Bevil	Member of Parliament for Cornwall; 1597; With: Jonathan Trelawny	Succeeded by Sir Walter Raleigh; John Arundell
Preceded by Thomas Edmunds; Sampson Lennard	Member of Parliament for Liskeard; 1604; With: Reginald Nicholas	Succeeded by Richard Connock; John Glanville
Preceded by Sir William Maynard	Member of Parliament for Penryn; 1614; With: (Sir) Francis Crane	Succeeded by (Sir) Francis Crane; Robert Jermyn
