= James Hamilton, Viscount Hamilton =

British nobleman and politician

James Hamilton
- Born: 7 October 1786; Petersham Lodge, Surrey, Britain
- Died: 27 May 1814 (aged 27)
- Occupation: Viscount

James Hamilton, Viscount Hamilton (7 October 1786 – 27 May 1814) was a British nobleman and politician.

== Birth and education ==
The eldest son of John Hamilton, 1st Marquess of Abercorn, James Hamilton was born at Petersham Lodge, Surrey, on 7 October 1786, and baptized on 4 November at Petersham.

From the age of 5 Hamilton was tutored by his father's domestic chaplain, William Howley, who was later to become Bishop of London, and Archbishop of Canterbury. Later, he was educated at Harrow School, where he was a lieutenant, and then captain of volunteers in 1803. He matriculated at Christ Church, Oxford on 24 October 1805.

== Political career ==
Lord Abercorn intended to put Hamilton up as a candidate for County Donegal as soon as he could obtain sufficient interest there, or else for County Tyrone. The death of Abercorn's personal agent, James Hamilton, in 1806, damaged his personal interest in Donegal, and Viscount Hamilton was obliged to retire before the contest. Instead, he was put in (while underage) for Dungannon by Abercorn's political ally, Thomas Knox, 1st Viscount Northland, at a by-election in January 1807. At the 1807 general election, in May, Abercorn declined a compromise with Earl Conyngham to put Hamilton in at Donegal, and he was instead returned, still underage, for Liskeard, by his half-cousin Lord Eliot.

== Private life ==
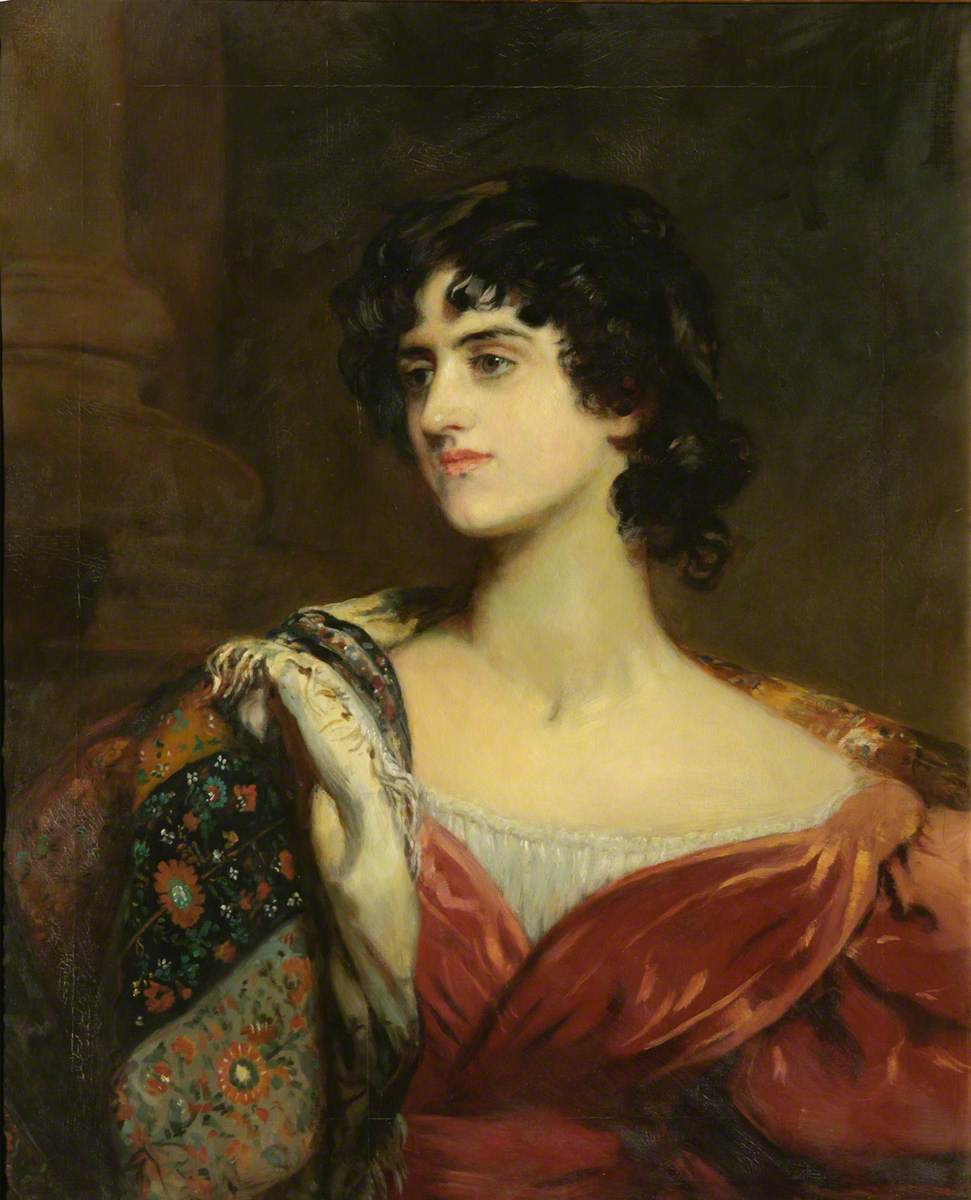
Harriet Hamilton, Dowager Viscountess Hamilton

On 25 November 1809, in London, he married Harriet Douglas, granddaughter of James Douglas, 14th Earl of Morton, by whom he had three children:

- James Hamilton, 1st Duke of Abercorn (1811–1885)
- Harriet Hamilton (1812–1884), married Admiral William Alexander Baillie-Hamilton and had issue
- Lord Claud Hamilton (1813–1884)

He evidently suffered from chronic illness, as his father described him as "long dying" in declining an offer from Lord Eliot to return him for Liskeard again in 1812, although he was a founding member of Grillion's that year. He died in his house in Upper Brook Street on 27 May 1814. His eldest son, James, would succeed his grandfather as Marquess of Abercorn four years later. His widow Harriet would in 1815 marry her brother-in-law, the 4th Earl of Aberdeen, with whom she had another 5 children.

== Notes ==
Parliament of Great Britain
Preceded by George Knox	Member of Parliament for Dungannon; 1807	Succeeded by Lord Claud Hamilton
Preceded by William Eliot; William Huskisson	Member of Parliament for Liskeard; 1807–1812; With: William Eliot	Succeeded by William Eliot; Charles Philip Yorke
