= Konik (disambiguation) =

Konik may refer to:

- Konik, a small Polish semi-feral horse
- Konik, Podlaskie Voivodeship, a village in the region of Podlachia
- Konik, Montenegro, a suburb of Podgorica
- Konik (surname)
- Konik (ritual), a Polish folk tradition
