= John Cork (disambiguation) =

John Cork is a writer and producer.

John Cork may also refer to:

- John Cork (MP)
- "John Cork", an informant in the Culper Ring

== See also ==
- Jack Cork
- John Corker
