= Konik (surname) =

Konik is a surname. Notable people with the surname include:

- Michael Konik, American author, television personality, jazz singer, improvisational comedian, blackjack player and poker player.
- George Konik (1937–2016), American professional ice hockey player
- Anna Konik (born 1974), Polish artist whose work includes installations, objects, video, photography and drawings
- Konstantin Konik (1873–1936), Estonian politician and surgeon, member of the Estonian Salvation Committee

== See also ==
- Connick
