= Philip Rashleigh =

Philip Rashleigh may refer to:

- Philip Rashleigh (1689–1736), MP for Liskeard 1710–22
- Philip Rashleigh (1729–1811), MP for Fowey 1765–1802
