= Robert Jermyn =

Robert Jermyn may refer to:

- Robert Jermyn (1539–1614), English MP and magistrate
- Robert Jermyn (1601–1623), English MP, grandson of the above
