= John Robinson (Liskeard MP) =

Member of the Parliament of England

John Robinson (born c. 1620) was an English politician who sat in the House of Commons in 1660.

Robinson was the second surviving son of William Robinson of Helston, Cornwall and his wife Catherine Penrose, daughter of Thomas Penrose of Sithney, Cornwall. He was baptised on 2 April 1620.

In 1660, Robinson was elected Member of Parliament for Liskeard in the Convention Parliament.

Robinson was probably unmarried. His brother Thomas was MP for Helston.
