= Charles Philip Yorke =

British politician

The Right Honourable Charles Philip Yorke FRS FSA
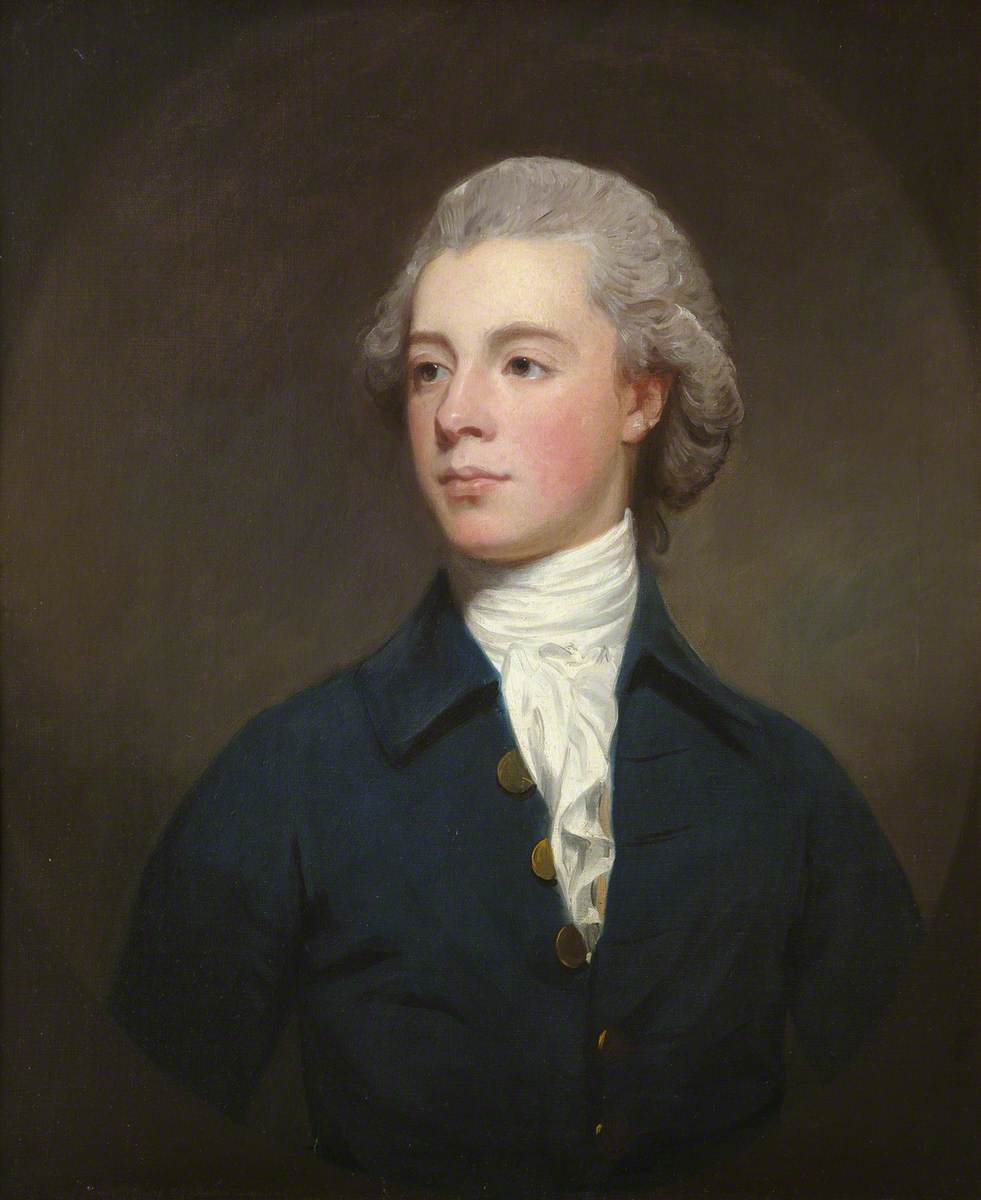
- Portrait by George Romney

Home Secretary
- In office 17 August 1803 – 12 May 1804
- Monarch: George III
- Prime Minister: Henry Addington
- Preceded by: Lord Pelham
- Succeeded by: The Lord Hawkesbury

Member of Parliament for Cambridgeshire
- In office 1790–1810
- Preceded by: Philip Yorke
- Succeeded by: Lord Francis Osborne

First Lord of the Admiralty
- In office 1810–1812
- Monarch: George III
- Prime Minister: Spencer Perceval
- Preceded by: Henry Phipps
- Succeeded by: Robert Dundas

Personal details
- Born: 12 March 1764
- Died: 13 March 1834 (aged 70)
- Party: Tory
- Spouse: Harriott Manningham

Charles Philip Yorke PC FRS FSA (12 March 1764 – 13 March 1834) was a British politician. He notably served as Home Secretary from 1803 to 1804.

== Political career ==
He sat as a member of parliament (MP) for Cambridgeshire from 1790 to 1810. He was commissioned as an officer in the Cambridgeshire Militia in 1793. He was promoted to major in 1795, a fellow officer was Captain George Manby By 1806 he was their colonel. He was MP for Liskeard from 1812 to 1818.

In 1801 he was appointed Secretary at War in Henry Addington's ministry, transferring to the Home Office in 1803, where he was a strong opponent of concession to the Roman Catholics. He made himself exceedingly unpopular in 1810 by bringing about the exclusion of strangers, including reporters for the press, from the House of Commons under the standing order, which led to the imprisonment of Sir Francis Burdett, 5th Baronet in the Tower and to riots in London. In the same year, Yorke joined Spencer Perceval's government as First Lord of the Admiralty. He retired from public life in 1818.

He was elected a Fellow of the Royal Society in 1801.

== Family ==
Yorke was the second son of the Hon. Charles Yorke and grandson of Philip Yorke, 1st Earl of Hardwicke. His mother was Agneta, daughter of Henry Johnstone. His brother was Admiral Sir Joseph Sidney Yorke (1768–1831), whose son succeeded to the earldom of Hardwicke.

Yorke married Harriott, eldest daughter of Charles Manningham, Esq. of Thorpe, Surrey in July 1790. They had no children. He died in March 1834, one day after his 70th birthday.

He had a natural son, Charles Eurwicke Douglas.

== Legacy ==
In 1802, Matthew Flinders named Yorke Peninsula in South Australia after Yorke.

Parliament of Great Britain
Preceded by Philip Yorke; James Whorwood Adeane	Member of Parliament for Cambridgeshire; 1790–1800; With: James Whorwood Adeane	Succeeded by (Parliament of Great Britain abolished)
Parliament of the United Kingdom
Preceded by (self in Parliament of Great Britain)	Member of Parliament for Cambridgeshire; 1801–1810; With: James Whorwood Adeane, to 1802; Sir Henry Peyton, Bt 1802; Lord Charles Manners 1802–1810	Succeeded by Lord Charles Manners; Lord Francis Osborne
Preceded by Sir Joseph Sidney Yorke; Matthew Montagu	Member of Parliament for St Germans; 1810–1812; With: Matthew Montagu	Succeeded by William Henry Pringle; Henry Goulburn
Preceded by William Eliot; Viscount Hamilton	Member of Parliament for Liskeard; 1812–1818; With: William Eliot	Succeeded by William Eliot; Sir William Pringle
Political offices
Preceded by Lord Pelham	Home Secretary; 1803–1804	Succeeded by Lord Hawkesbury
Preceded by The Lord Mulgrave	First Lord of the Admiralty; 1810–1812	Succeeded by The Viscount Melville
Preceded by Hon. William Eden	Teller of the Exchequer; 1813–1834	Succeeded by Charles William Manningham
