= John Connock (born 1631) =

English politician

John Connock (1631-c. 1675) was an English politician who sat in the House of Commons in 1660.

== Origins ==
He was the son of Nicholas Connock of St Cleer by his wife Joan Vivian, daughter of Hannibal Vivian of Trelowarren, Cornwall. He was a descendant of John Connock, MP for Liskeard in 1554.

== Career ==
He studied law at the Middle Temple in 1649. In 1658 he inherited the Treworgey estate from his uncle John Connock. In 1660 he was elected a Member of Parliament for Liskeard, Cornwall, in a double return to the Convention Parliament, but made little impact.

== Marriages and progeny ==
Connock married firstly Bridget Hele, daughter of Walter Hele of Whympston, Modbury, Devon. He married secondly Elizabeth Courtenay, widow of John Tremayne of Collacombe, Devon, and daughter of John Courtenay of Molland, Devon. His son John Connock (d. 1730) was also MP for Liskeard.

== Death ==
Connock's will dated 1674 was proved in March 1676.
