= William Eliot, 2nd Earl of St Germans =

British diplomat and politician (1767–1845)

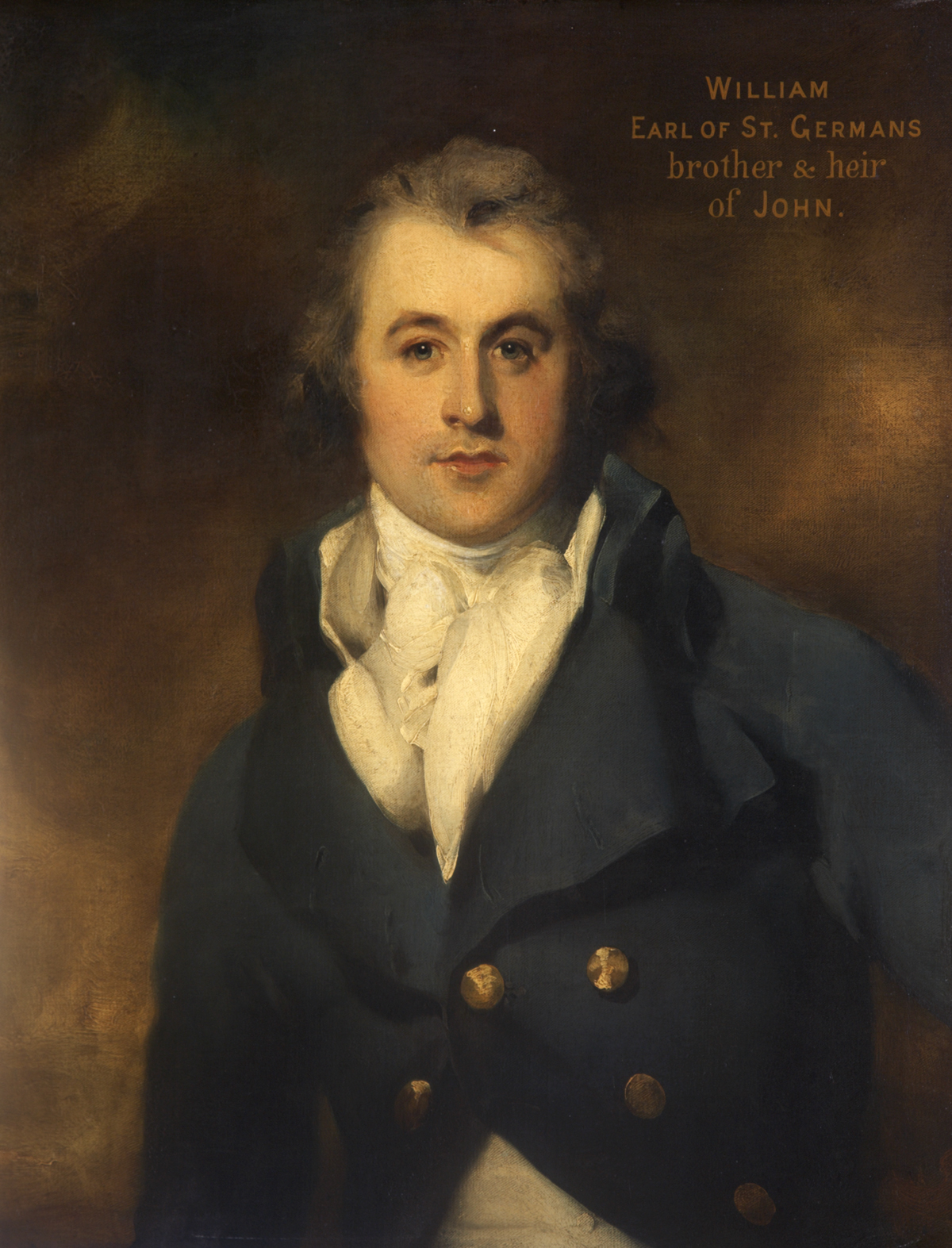
- Portrait by Thomas Lawrence

Member of the British Parliament for St Germans
- In office 1791–1802

Member of the British Parliament for Liskeard
- In office 1802–1823

Under-Secretary of State for Foreign Affairs
- In office 1804–1805

Earl of St Germans
- In office 17 November 1823 – 1845
- Preceded by: John Eliot
- Succeeded by: Edward Eliot

Personal details
- Born: 1 April 1767
- Died: 19 January 1845 (aged 77)
- Spouses: Lady Georgiana Augusta Leveson-Gower (m. 1797; died 1806); Letitia A'Court (m. 1809; died 1810); Charlotte Robinson (m. 1812; died 1813); Susan Mordaunt (m. 1814; died 1830)
- Children: 4, including Edward Eliot
- Parents: Edward Craggs-Eliot, 1st Baron Eliot (father); Catherine Elliston (mother)
- Relatives: John Eliot (brother); Edward James Eliot (brother); Edward Granville Eliot (son); Henry Lygon, 4th Earl Beauchamp (son-in-law)
- Education: Pembroke College, Cambridge
- Occupation: military officer and diplomat

William Eliot, 2nd Earl of St Germans (1 April 1767 – 19 January 1845), styled as Hon. William Eliot from 1784 until 1823, was a British peer, diplomat and politician.

Port Eliot, St Germans, the Eliot family seat

Eliot was born at Port Eliot, Cornwall, the third son of Edward Craggs-Eliot, 1st Baron Eliot and his wife Catherine (née Elliston). He was educated at Pembroke College, Cambridge, taking an M.A. in 1786. He served as an officer with the East Cornwall Militia.

From November 1791 until 1793 he was a Secretary of Legation at Berlin, from 1793 to 1794 Secretary of Embassy and Minister Plenipotentiary at The Hague and from 1796 Minister Plenipotentiary to the Elector Palatine and to the Diet of Ratisbon. Eliot also sat as Tory Member of Parliament for St Germans from 1791 to 1802 and for Liskeard from 1802 to 1823. He served as a Lord of the Admiralty from 1800 to 1804, as Parliamentary Under-Secretary of State for Foreign Affairs from 1804 to 1805 and as one of the Lords Commissioners of the Treasury from 1807 to 1812.

In 1823, he succeeded his eldest brother John by special remainder as second Earl of St Germans and entered the House of Lords.

== Family ==
Lord St Germans was married and widowed four times.

Firstly, in November 1797 at Trentham, Staffordshire, he married Lady Georgiana Augusta Leveson-Gower (13 April 1769 – 24 March 1806), daughter of Granville Leveson-Gower, 1st Marquess of Stafford. They had one son and three daughters:

- Edward Granville Eliot, 3rd Earl of St Germans (29 August 1798 – 7 October 1877), married Lady Jemima Cornwallis, daughter of Charles Cornwallis, 2nd Marquess Cornwallis
- Lady Caroline Georgina Eliot (27 July 1799 – April 1865), died unmarried
- Lady Susan Caroline Eliot (12 April 1801 – 15 January 1835), married Henry Lygon, 4th Earl Beauchamp
- Lady Charlotte Sophia Eliot (28 May 1802 – 8 July 1839), married Rev. George Martin, Canon of Exeter

After Lady Georgiana's death of tuberculosis, he married again on 13 February 1809 at Heytesbury, Wiltshire, to Letitia à Court (9 August 1778 – 10 January 1810), daughter of Sir William Percy Ashe à Court. She died in childbirth along with their child.

On 7 March 1812 at the Earl of Powis' House, Berkeley Square, London, he married the earl's niece Charlotte Robinson (26 March 1784 – 3 July 1813), daughter of John Robinson, MP of Denston Hall, and the Hon. Rebecca Clive (daughter of Robert Clive, 1st Baron Clive (Clive of India) and Margaret Clive). She also died in childbirth, with no surviving issue.

On 20 August 1814 at Walton, Warwickshire, he married Susan Mordaunt (15 December 1779 – 5 February 1830), daughter of Sir John Mordaunt, 7th Baronet, with no issue.

He died at Port Eliot in 1845, following an attack of paralysis. His only surviving daughter, Lady Caroline, was by his side. He was succeeded by his eldest son.

Parliament of Great Britain
| Preceded by Marquess of Lorne; Edward James Eliot | Member of Parliament for St Germans; 1791–1800; With: Marquess of Lorne 1791–1796; Lord Grey of Groby 1796–1802 | Succeeded by (Parliament of Great Britain abolished) |
Parliament of the United Kingdom
| Preceded by (self in Parliament of Great Britain) | Member of Parliament for St Germans; 1801–1802; With: Lord Grey of Groby 1796–1802 | Succeeded by Lord Binning; James Langham |
| Preceded by John Eliot; Lord Dunmore | Member of Parliament for Liskeard; 1802–1823; With: John Eliot 1802–1804; William Huskisson 1804–1807; Viscount Hamilton 1807–1812; Charles Philip Yorke 1812–1818; Sir William Henry Pringle 1818–1823 | Succeeded by Sir William Henry Pringle; Lord Eliot |
Political offices
| Preceded by Charles Arbuthnot | Under-Secretary of State for Foreign Affairs; 1804–1805 | Succeeded by Robert Ward |
Peerage of the United Kingdom
| Preceded by John Eliot | Earl of St Germans; 1823–1845 | Succeeded by Edward Granville Eliot |
