= William Henry Pringle =

British Army officer

Lieutenant-General Sir William Henry Pringle GCB
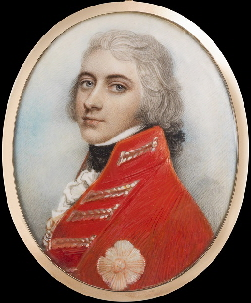
- Portrait by Andrew Plimer
- Born: 21 August 1772; Dublin
- Died: 23 December 1840 (aged 68); Stratford Place, London
- Education: Drogheda Grammar School
- Military career
- Allegiance: United Kingdom
- Branch: British Army
- Service years: 1792–1840
- Rank: Lieutenant-General
- Units: 16th Light Dragoons; 111th Regiment of Foot; 4th Regiment of Foot; Coldstream Guards; 1st Regiment of Foot
- Commands: Inspecting Field Officer of Militia, North America; Brigade, 5th Division; 5th Division; Brigade, 2nd Division; 2nd Division
- Conflicts: French Revolutionary Wars; Flanders campaign; Anglo-Russian Invasion of Holland; Battle of Castricum (POW); Napoleonic Wars; Hanover Expedition; Copenhagen Expedition; Peninsular War; Battle of Salamanca; Siege of Burgos; Battle of Villa Muriel; Battle of Maya; Battle of Beunza; Battle of Nivelle; Battle of St Pierre; Battle of Garris (WIA)
- Awards: Army Gold Cross
- Other work: Member of Parliament

Lieutenant-General Sir William Henry Pringle GCB (21 August 1772 – 23 December 1840) was a British Army officer who served as a Member of Parliament (MP) for two constituencies in Cornwall.

He was born the eldest son of Maj-Gen. Henry Pringle, of Dublin and educated privately and at Trinity College Dublin.

He joined the British Army as a cornet and progressed to the rank of Colonel of the 64th Foot in 1816. Further promotion to Lieutenant-General followed before he was transferred as Colonel for life in 1837 to the 45th Regiment of Foot. He was made KCB in 1815 and GCB in 1834.

He was MP for St Germans from 1812 to 1818, and then for Liskeard from 1818 to 1832.

He died in 1840. He had married Harriet Hester Eliot on 20 May 1806 (the daughter and heiress of Hon. Edward James Eliot) with whom he had a son and 4 daughters.

== External Sources ==
Sir William Henry Pringle's correspondence at the John Rylands Library, Manchester

Parliament of the United Kingdom
Preceded by Charles Philip Yorke; Matthew Montagu	Member of Parliament for St Germans; 1812–1818; With: Henry Goulburn	Succeeded by Seymour Thomas Bathurst; Charles Arbuthnot
Preceded by William Eliot; Charles Philip Yorke	Member of Parliament for Liskeard; 1818–1832; With: William Eliot 1818–26; Edward Eliot 1826–32	Succeeded by Charles Buller
Military offices
Preceded by Henry Wynyard	Colonel of the 64th (2nd Staffordshire) Regiment of Foot; 1816–1837	Succeeded by Sir Richard Bourke
