= Ralph Trenewith (died 1427) =

14th-century English politician

Ralph Trenewith (died 1427), of Fentongollan in St Michael Penkivel and Trenowth in St. Probus, Cornwall, was an English Member of Parliament in 1395 for Liskeard.
