= Sir Lewis Molesworth, 11th Baronet =

British politician (1853–1912)

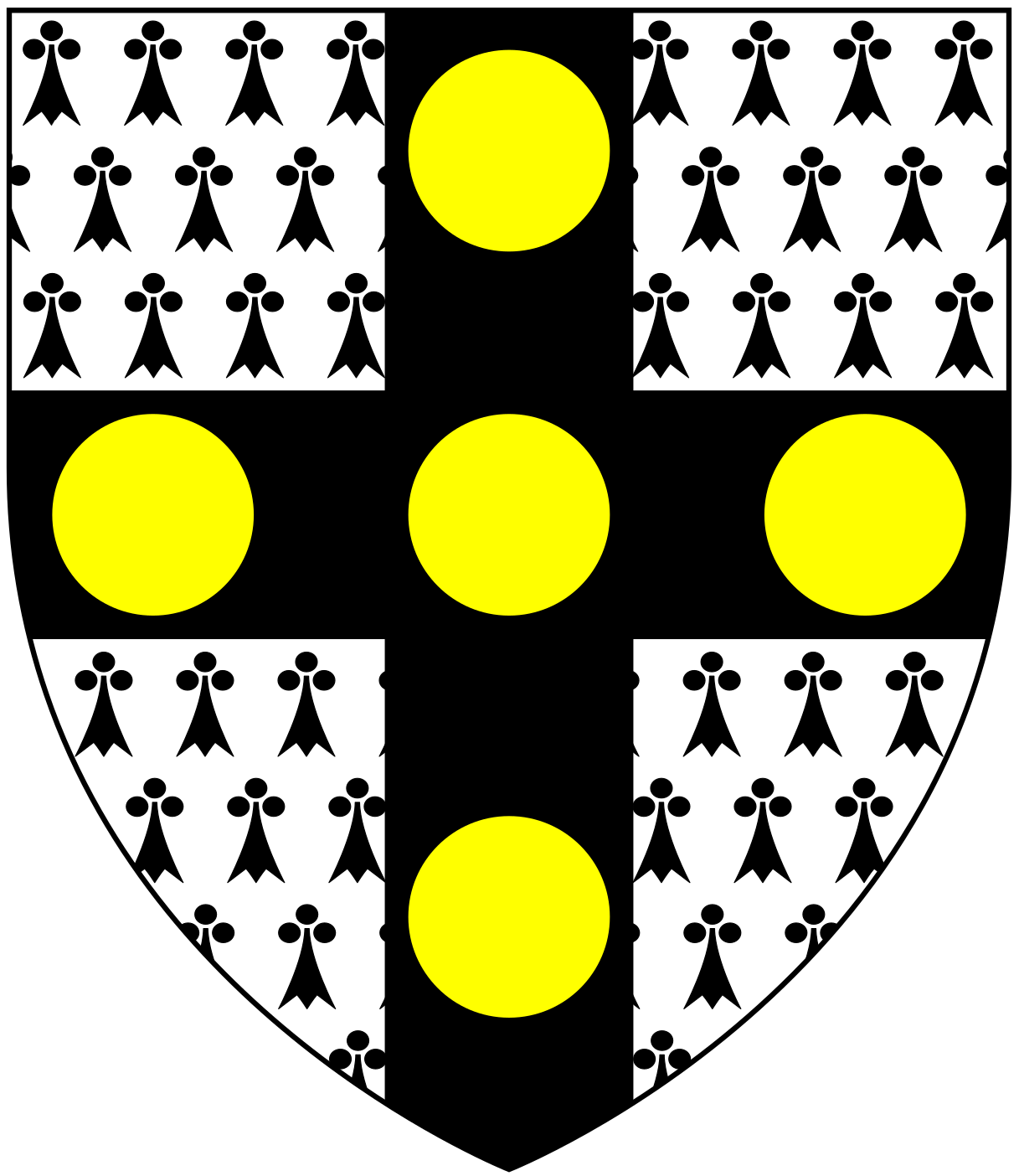
Arms of St Aubyn, as quartered by the Molesworth-St Aubyn Baronets of Pencarrow: Ermine, on a cross sable five bezants

Sir Lewis William Molesworth, 11th Baronet (31 October 1853 – 29 May 1912) was an English landowner from Cornwall and a Liberal Unionist Party politician.

== Family and education ==
Lewis Molesworth was the eldest son of The Reverend Sir Paul William Molesworth, 10th of the Molesworth Baronets. He was the first cousin once removed of Sir William Molesworth, 8th Baronet, who served as Colonial Secretary under Lord Palmerston. Lewis succeeded to the baronetcy on the death of his father in 1889. Sir Paul Molesworth had been an Anglican rector but converted to Roman Catholicism in 1854 and he passed on his religion to his son Lewis. Lewis was duly educated at Beaumont and Stonyhurst Colleges.

On 3 June 1875, he married Jane Graham, the daughter of Brigadier-General Daniel Marsh Frost of St Louis, Missouri. The couple did not have any children. Lady Molesworth died in September 1913 of heart failure, which an inquest jury found had been brought on by the sting of a wasp. She died at Trewarthenick, where she and her husband shared a home.

== Politics ==
Molesworth descended from an old established landowning family. One source records he owned 20,000 acres. It is likely he inherited substantially from the earlier Molesworth baronets, who as recently as the time of Lewis' birth, had income from estates in Huntingdonshire and Jamaica as well as interests in mining and banking. In 1909 he inherited the Pencarrow Estate in North Cornwall which had been in the Molesworth family since the late 16th century. Consequently, Sir Lewis Molesworth had sufficient private income and was in the privileged position of being able to give his time and commitment to his public career.

He fought his first Parliamentary seat at the 1892 general election in the Liberal Unionist interest at Launceston in his home county of Cornwall. Traditionally a Conservative seat, Launceston went Liberal after 1885. The sitting MP, Sir Charles Thomas Dyke Acland, was returned unopposed in 1886 but by 1892, Acland had stood down and a new Liberal candidate was installed. Molesworth picked up the Unionist baton for this election but lost by 984 votes.

Molesworth did not make a commitment to fighting Launceston again, although it was hoped by the Liberal Unionists that he might be their candidate in 1895. In the event however, Molesworth did not contest any seat at the 1895 general election. His next election was as Liberal Unionist candidate for another local seat, Bodmin, in 1900 and this time he was successful. The political views of the former MP, Leonard Courtney, had been gradually diverging from those of his Liberal Unionist supporters in Bodmin and his opposition to the policy of the government on South Africa proved decisive. At a meeting at Liskeard on 16 June 1900, the Bodmin Liberal Unionists voted not to re-adopt Courtney at the coming election and to ask Molesworth to place his views before their association with a view to becoming their candidate. He duly addressed a meeting of the Liberal Unionist Association at Liskeard on 30 June when he was adopted by 31 votes to 5; the dissenting voices apparently feeling his views on temperance issues were sufficiently advanced. At the election, Molesworth (supported by the Liberal Unionists' Conservative allies) retained the seat for the Liberal Unionists with a majority of 1,032 votes.

Courtney gradually reverted to formal membership of the Liberal party and, in January 1906, unsuccessfully contested Edinburgh West as a supporter of Sir Henry Campbell-Bannerman at the general election. Perhaps as a reward, he was elevated to the peerage in the 1906 Birthday Honours list.

However, Molesworth only served a single Parliamentary term. At the beginning of 1905, he wrote to the Liberal Unionist Association advising them that, because of his general state of health, he could not undertake another election campaign and tendered his resignation. He served out the rest of his Parliamentary term until the 1906 general election by which time he was 52 years old, but did not stand for Parliament again.

== Other interests and public appointments ==
Molesworth was elected a Fellow of the Royal Geographical Society in 1894 It is also known that at some point, probably in the 1880s, Molesworth served as an officer in the West Somerset Yeomanry cavalry.

In 1898 he was appointed to serve as a Sheriff for the County of Cornwall and was High Sheriff in 1899.

Molesworth also served as a Justice of the Peace for the county of Cornwall, and was appointed a deputy lieutenant of the county on 19 March 1900.

== Death and succession ==
Molesworth died suddenly, aged 58, on 29 May 1912 at Vane Tower, an Italianate villa in Torquay, where he had arrived on a visit. He was buried on 1 June 1912 in the churchyard of the church at Cornelly where he had been christened. As he and his wife had no children, the baronetcy passed to Lewis’ cousin, St. Aubyn Hender Molesworth-St Aubyn, formerly the vicar of Collingham in the West Riding of Yorkshire and the great-great-grandson of Sir John St Aubyn, 4th Baronet of the St Aubyn Baronetcy of Clowance, in the County of Cornwall. The father of the twelfth Baronet, the Reverend Hender Molesworth, had assumed by Royal licence the additional surname of St Aubyn, through his mother (the twelfth baronet's grandmother) Catherine St Aubyn. This resulted in the baronetcy being renamed the Molesworth-St Aubyn Baronetcy, providing a linkage back to the extinct (since 1839) St Aubyn Baronetcy.

Parliament of the United Kingdom
| Preceded by Leonard Henry Courtney | Member of Parliament for Bodmin; 1900 – 1906 | Succeeded by Thomas Agar-Robartes |
Baronetage of England
| Preceded by Paul Molesworth | Baronet of Pencarrow; 1889–1912 | Succeeded by St Aubyn Molesworth-St Aubyn |
