= Leonard Courtney, 1st Baron Courtney of Penwith =

British politician (1832–1918)

The Right Honourable The Lord Courtney of Penwith PC
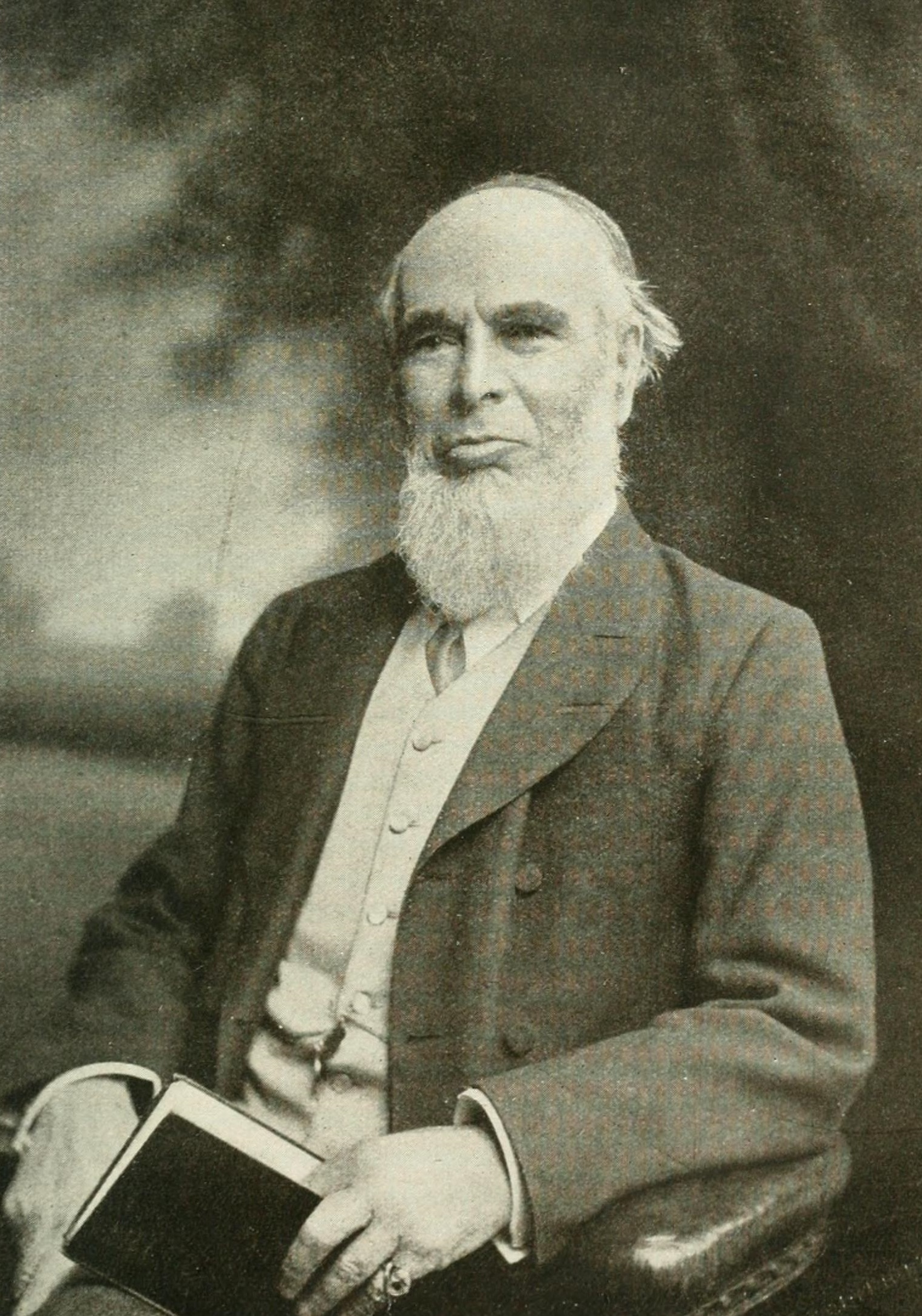

Deputy Speaker of the House of Commons Chairman of Ways and Means
- In office 1886–1893
- Preceded by: Sir Arthur Otway
- Succeeded by: John William Mellor

Financial Secretary to the Treasury
- In office 6 May 1882 – 12 December 1884
- Preceded by: Lord Frederick Cavendish
- Succeeded by: J. T. Hibbert

Under-Secretary of State for the Colonies
- In office 26 June 1881 – 6 May 1882
- Preceded by: M. E. Grant Duff
- Succeeded by: Evelyn Ashley

Under-Secretary of State for the Home Department
- In office 1881 – 26 June 1881
- Preceded by: Lord Peel
- Succeeded by: Lord Rosebery

Member of Parliament for Bodmin Liskeard (1876–1885)
- In office 22 December 1876 – 26 September 1900
- Preceded by: Edward Horsman
- Succeeded by: Sir Lewis Molesworth

Personal details
- Born: 6 July 1832 Penzance, Cornwall, England
- Died: 11 May 1918 (aged 85) Chelsea, London, England
- Party: Liberal; Liberal Unionist
- Spouse: Catherine Courtney (m. 1883)
- Education: St John's College, Cambridge; Lincoln's Inn

Leonard Henry Courtney, 1st Baron Courtney of Penwith PC (6 July 1832 – 11 May 1918) was a radical British politician, and an academic, who became famous after being advocate of proportional representation in Parliament and acting as an opponent of imperialism and militarism.

He was a member of William Ewart Gladstone's second administration from 1880 to 1883 and served as Chairman of Ways and Means (Deputy Speaker of the House of Commons) between 1886 and 1893. He was the first and the last Baron Courtney of Penwith.

== Background and education ==
Courtney was born at Penzance, Cornwall. He was the eldest son of John Sampson Courtney, a banker, and Sarah, daughter of John Mortimer. Two of his brothers, John Mortimer Courtney (1838–1920), and William Prideaux Courtney (1845–1913), also attained public distinction, the former in the government service in Canada (from 1869, retiring in 1906), rising to be deputy-minister of finance, and the latter in the British civil service (1865–1892), and as a prominent man of letters and bibliographer. He was educated at St John's College, Cambridge, where he was Second Wrangler and first Smith's Prizeman, and elected a fellow of his college. He was called to the bar at Lincoln's Inn in 1858. From 1872 to 1875 he was professor of political economy at University College London. He was president of the Royal Geological Society of Cornwall from 1881 to 1882.

== Political career ==
In December 1876, after a previous unsuccessful attempt, Courtney was elected to parliament for Liskeard as a Liberal. He continued to represent the borough, and Bodmin into which it was merged by the Redistribution of Seats Act 1885, until 1900, when his attitude towards the South African War (he and his wife Catherine were one of the foremost of the so-called Pro-Boer Party) compelled his retirement.

Until 1885, he was a devoted adherent of William Ewart Gladstone, particularly in finance and foreign affairs. In 1880 he was appointed Under-Secretary of State for the Home Department, in 1881 Under-Secretary of State for the Colonies and in 1882 Financial Secretary to the Treasury. He was known as a stubborn fighter for principle, and after finding that the government's Reform Bill in 1884 contained no recognition of the scheme for proportional representation, to which he was deeply committed, he resigned office. He refused to support Gladstone's Home Rule Bill in 1886 and was one of those who chiefly contributed to its rejection, whose reputation for unbending integrity and intellectual eminence gave solidity to the Liberal Unionist party.

In 1886, Courtney was elected Chairman of Ways and Means (Deputy Speaker of the House of Commons) and was sworn of the Privy Council in 1889. His efficiency in this office seemed to mark him out for the speakership after the 1895 general election. A Liberal Unionist, however, could be elected only by Conservative votes, and he had made himself objectionable to a large section of the Conservative Party by his independent attitude on various questions, on which his liberalism outweighed his party loyalty. He, would in any case, have been incapacitated by an affection of the eyesight, which for a while threatened to withdraw him from public life altogether.

After 1895, Courtney's divergences from the Unionist party on questions other than Irish politics became gradually more marked. He became known in the House of Commons principally for his candid criticism of the measures introduced by his nominal leaders, and he was rather to be ranked among the Opposition than as a Ministerialist. When the crisis with the Transvaal came in 1899, Courtney's views, which remained substantially what they were when he supported the settlement after Majuba in 1881, had plainly become incompatible with his position even as a nominal follower of Lord Salisbury and Joseph Chamberlain.

He led the work of the South African Conciliation Committee which brought the sufferings of the Boers to the attention of British people.

In November 1902, he was appointed chairman of the Royal Commission on Superannuation of the Civil Service, which delivered their report the following year.

He gradually reverted to formal membership of the Liberal party and, in January 1906, unsuccessfully contested Edinburgh West as a supporter of Sir Henry Campbell-Bannerman at the general election. Among the birthday honours of 1906 he was elevated to the peerage as Baron Courtney of Penwith, in the County of Cornwall.

Courtney was a prominent supporter of the women's movement through the influence of his wife and sister-in-law. In his earlier years, he was a regular contributor to The Times, and he wrote numerous essays in the principal reviews on political and economic subjects. In 1901, he published a book on The Working Constitution of the United Kingdom. He was President of the Royal Statistical Society, 1897–99. He was a great friend of artist Norman Garstin.

== Personal life ==
Courtney married Catherine Potter, daughter of Richard Potter and an elder sister of Beatrice Webb, on 15 March 1883 at St Jude's Church, Whitechapel. They had no children.

In May 1918, aged 85, he was living at 15 Cheyne Walk at the time of his death. He left effects totalling £56,672 2s 6d. The peerage became extinct.

== Gallery ==
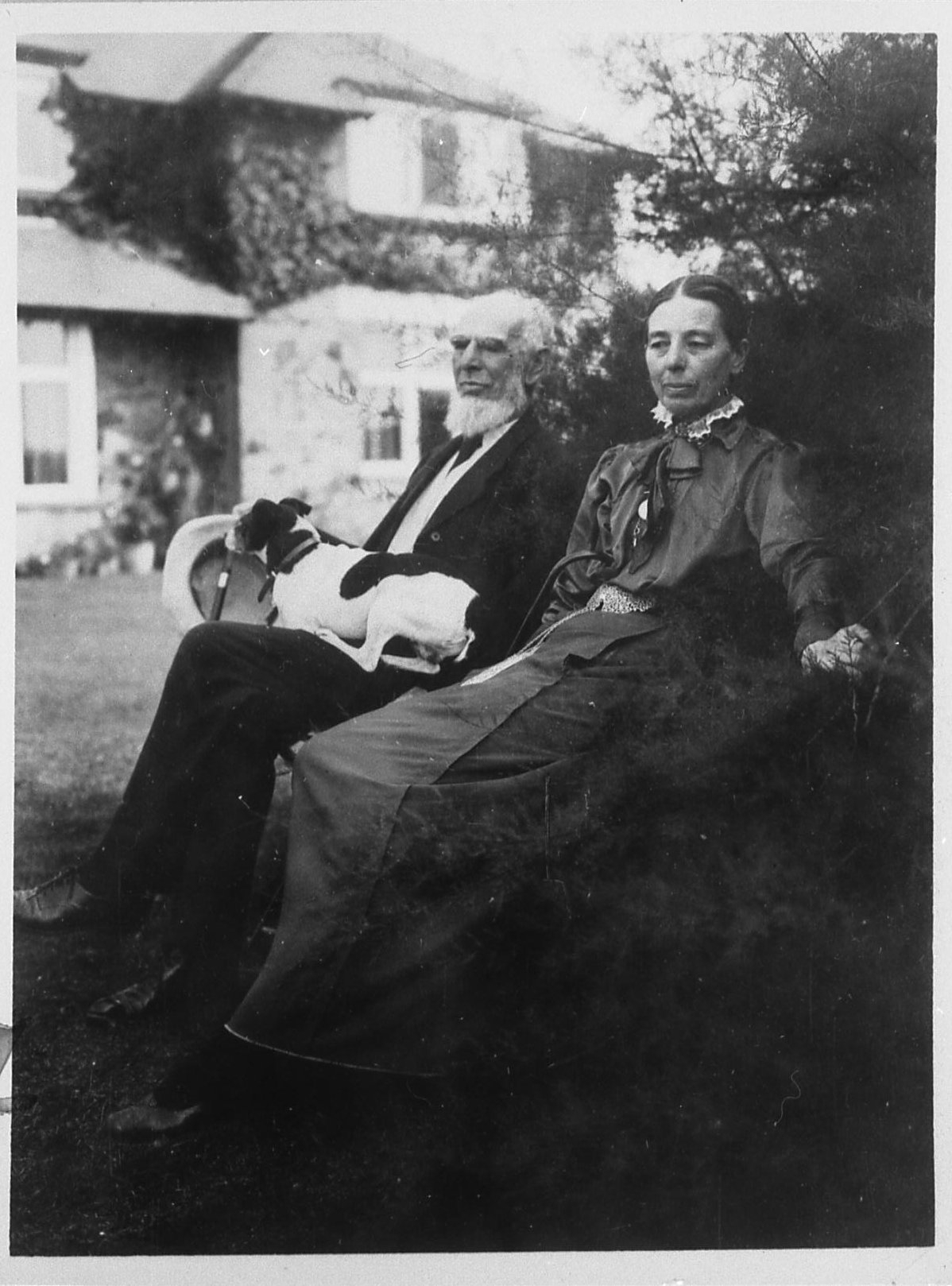
Lord Courtney and his wife Catherine in 1916

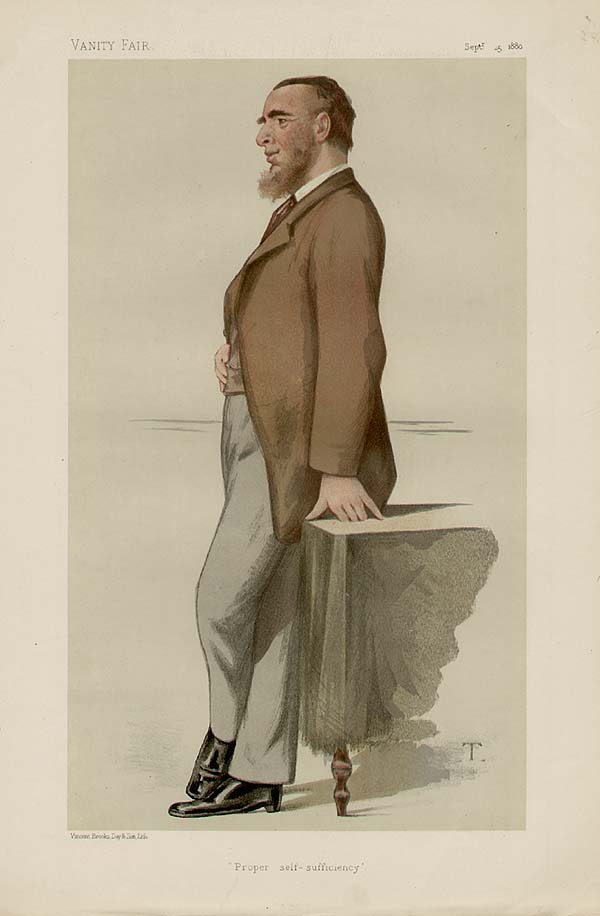
"Proper self-sufficiency"
Caricature of Courtney by "T" (Théobald Chartran) in Vanity Fair, 25 September 1880

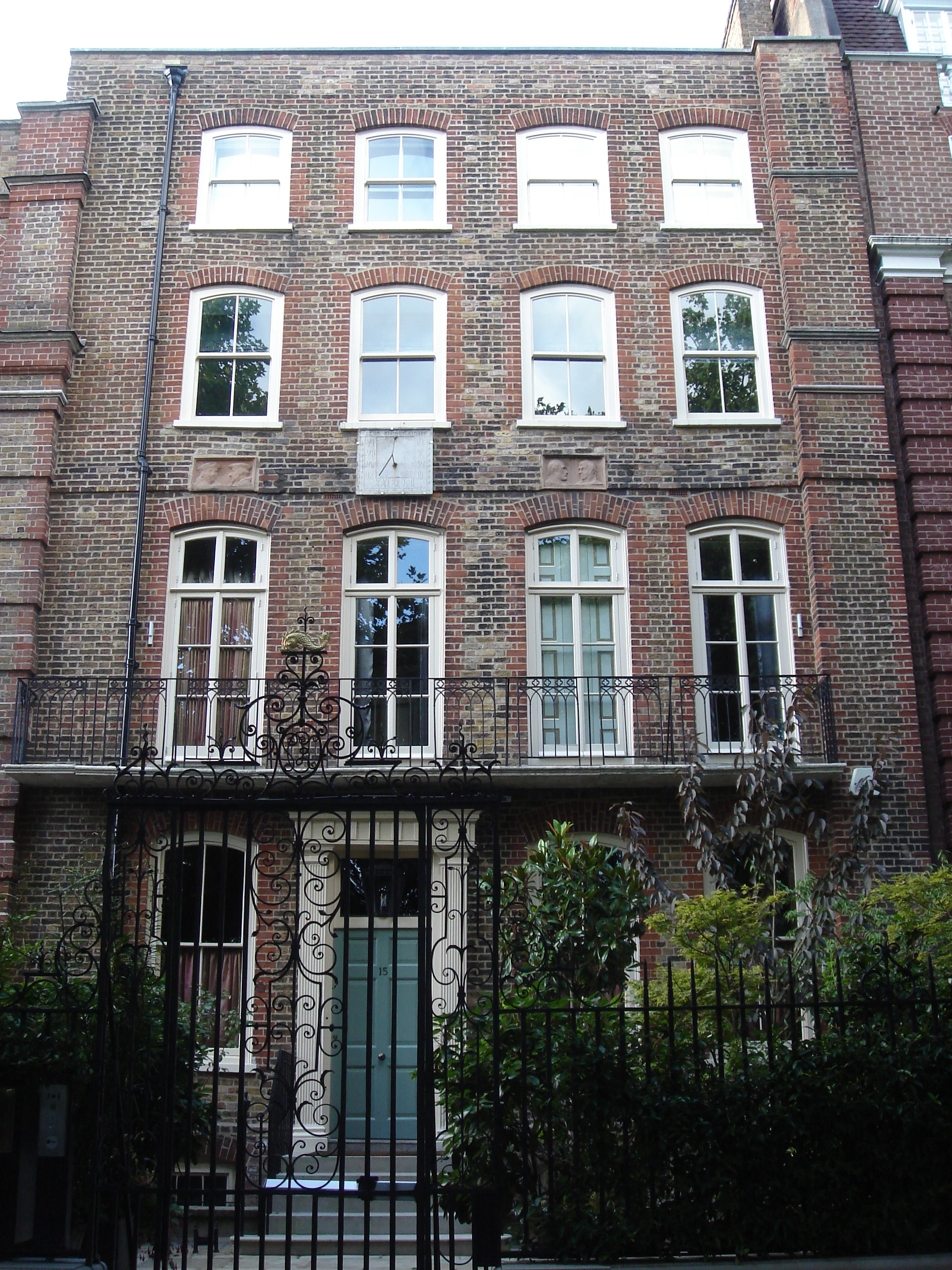
15 Cheyne Walk, Chelsea, London, where Courtney was living at the time of his death

== Arms ==
Coat of arms of Leonard Courtney, 1st Baron Courtney of Penwith
Crest A torteau charged with a dolphin Or. Escutcheon Gules, three bezants, on a chief Or as many Cornish choughs Proper. Supporters On either side a doctor of civil law of the University of Cambridge, vested in his robes, the dexter holding in his right hand an open book, the sinister in the right hand a pen, in the left hand a scroll all Proper. Motto Ut Liberati Serviamus

== Works ==
- Nationalism and War in the Near East (1915)

Parliament of the United Kingdom
Preceded by Edward Horsman	Member of Parliament for Liskeard; 1876–1885	Succeeded by Constituency merged into Bodmin
Preceded by Hon. Frederick Leveson-Gower; James Wyld	Member of Parliament for Bodmin; 1885–1900	Succeeded by Sir Lewis Molesworth
Preceded by Sir Arthur Otway, Bt	Chairman of Ways and Means; 1886–1893	Succeeded by John William Mellor
Political offices
Preceded by Arthur Wellesley Peel	Under-Secretary of State for the Home Department; 1881	Succeeded by The Earl of Rosebery
Preceded by M. E. Grant Duff	Under-Secretary of State for the Colonies; 1881–1882	Succeeded by Evelyn Ashley
Preceded by Lord Frederick Cavendish	Financial Secretary to the Treasury; 1882–1884	Succeeded by John Tomlinson Hibbert
