= Henry Wynyard =

British Army officer

General Henry Wynyard
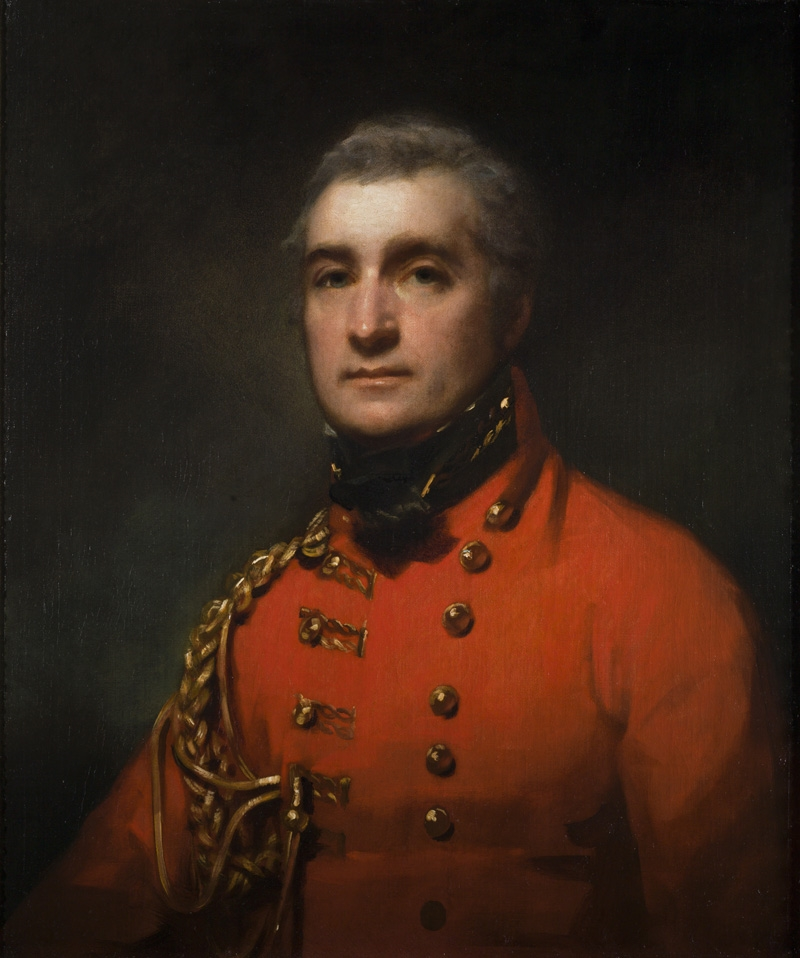
- Portrait by Henry Raeburn
- Born: 8 June 1761
- Died: 3 April 1838 (aged 76)
- Military career
- Allegiance: United Kingdom
- Branch: British Army
- Service years: 1778–1816
- Rank: General
- Commands: Commander-in-Chief, Scotland
- Conflicts: French Revolutionary Wars; Anglo-Russian invasion of Holland

General Henry Wynyard (8 June 1761 – 3 April 1838) was a British Army officer who became Commander-in-Chief, Scotland.

== Military career ==
Wynyard was commissioned as an ensign in the First Regiment of Footguards on 6 June 1778. He took part in the expedition to Holland in February 1793 and saw action at Arnhem in November 1794 during the French Revolutionary Wars. Promoted to brevet colonel he landed in command of a battalion of grenadiers at the Helder in August 1799 and was wounded at Battle of Bergen in September 1799 during the Anglo-Russian invasion of Holland. Promoted to major-general in April 1802, he was given command of a brigade of guards in Southern District in May 1803. He took part in an expedition to Sicily in September 1806 and returned to Southern District in January 1808. Promoted to lieutenant-general in April 1808 he transferred to the staff in Ireland in June 1808 and then became Commander-in-Chief, Scotland in July 1812. He retired from his post in April 1816 and was promoted to full general on 12 August 1819.

Wynyard was also colonel of the 64th Regiment of Foot from 1808 to 1816 and of the 46th (South Devonshire) Regiment of Foot from 1816 to his death. He lived his final years in London at 2 Upper Brook Street, Mayfair.

Military offices
Preceded by Earl Cathcart	Commander-in-Chief, Scotland; 1812–1816	Succeeded by Sir John Hope
Preceded by John Whyte	Colonel of the 46th (South Devonshire) Regiment of Foot; 1816–1838	Succeeded by Sir John Keane, 1st Baron Keane
Preceded by William Anne Vilettes	Colonel of the 64th (2nd Staffordshire) Regiment of Foot; 1808–1816	Succeeded by Sir William Henry Pringle
