= William Bridges (politician) =

British politician

William Bridges (died 30 October 1714), of Wallington, Surrey, was a British politician who sat in the English and British House of Commons from 1695 to 1714.

Bridges was the son of Robert Bridges and his wife Mary (née Woodcock).

Bridges was returned as Member of Parliament (MP) for Liskeard, Cornwall at the 1695 English general election and sat until 1714. He was a member of the Board of Ordnance.

He acquired the estate of Kenwood House from Brook Bridges, rebuilding the house, and selling it in 1705 to John Walter of London.

Military offices
Preceded by Samuel Fortrey	Clerk of the Deliveries of the Ordnance; 1682–1683	Succeeded by Thomas Gardiner
Preceded by Edward Conyers	Storekeeper of the Ordnance; 1683–1685	Succeeded by Thomas Gardiner
Preceded by John Charlton	Surveyor-General of the Ordnance; 1702–1714	Succeeded by Michael Richards
Parliament of England
Preceded by Emanuel Pyper; Sir Bourchier Wrey	Member of Parliament for Liskeard; 1695–1707; With: Sir Bourchier Wrey 1695–1696; Henry Darell 1696–1701; Thomas Dodson 1701–1707	Succeeded by Parliament of Great Britain
Parliament of Great Britain
Preceded by Parliament of England	Member of Parliament for Liskeard; 1707–1714; With: John Dolben 1707–1710; Philip Rashleigh 1710–1714	Succeeded by Sir John Trelawny; Philip Rashleigh
