= Simon Lowys =

Member of the Parliament of England

Simon Lowys or Laws of Liskeard, Cornwall, was a Member of Parliament for Liskeard in October 1383, November 1384, 1385, February 1388, September 1388, January 1390, 1393, January 1397, 1402, 1410, 1411, May 1413 and November 1414 and for Lostwithiel in 1391.
