= Liskeard (constituency) =

Former parliamentary constituency in the United Kingdom

- Former borough constituency for the House of Commons

1295–1885
- Seats: two (1295–1832); one (1832–1885)
- Replaced by: Bodmin

Liskeard was a parliamentary borough in Cornwall, which elected two Members of Parliament (MPs) to the House of Commons from 1295 until 1832, and then one member from 1832 until 1885. The constituency was abolished by the Redistribution of Seats Act 1885.

== History ==
The parliamentary borough was based upon the community of Liskeard in the south-eastern part of Cornwall.

Sedgwick estimated the electorate at 30 in 1740. Namier and Brooke considered it was about 50 in the 1754–1790 period. The right of election before 1832 was in the freemen of the borough. This constituency was under the patronage of the Eliot family, which acquired the predominant interest by 1722.

There were no contested elections between at least 1715 and 1802. In the early 19th century the Whigs attempted to expand the electorate to include householders. During the 1802 general election, 48 householders claimed the right to vote but their ballots were rejected by the Mayor (see the note to the 1802 election result below). The Eliot family continued to control the borough in the Tory interest, for another thirty years.

The Reform Act 1832 augmented the freemen voters (who retained their ancient right votes), with the beneficiaries of a new householder franchise. The number of voters registered in 1832 was 218. The political effect of the change was that a Whig was elected unopposed to the one remaining seat in 1832, whereas the two Tory candidates had been elected unopposed at the previous seven general elections. Only Whig or Liberal candidates were returned from 1832 until the constituency was abolished.

The Reform Act 1867 preserved the borough constituency but slightly expanded the electorate (from 434 in 1865 to 881 in 1868). Liskeard was one of the smallest boroughs to retain individual representation in the 1868–1885 period. However the constituency was finally abolished by the Redistribution of Seats Act 1885, when the borough became part of the Bodmin or South East division of Cornwall.

== Members of Parliament ==
=== 1295–1629 ===
- Constituency created (1295)

Parliament	First member	Second member
1355	John Hamely	
1386	John Bodilly	Stephen Bant
1388 (Feb)	Simon Lowys	John Helligan
1388 (Sep)	Simon Lowys	Walter Bloyowe
1390 (Jan)	Simon Lowys	John Cokeworthy I
1390 (Nov)		
1391	Robert Brewys	John Goly
1393	Simon Lowys	Robert Combe
1394		
1395	Ralph Cokeworthy	Ralph Trenewith II
1397 (Jan)	Simon Lowys	John Tregoose
1397 (Sep)	John Gryk	Robert Syteston
1399	Walter Gosham	Thomas Forster
1401		
1402	Simon Lowys	John Price
1404 (Jan)		
1404 (Oct)		
1406	John Treffridowe	Williard Hamond
1407	William Aston	Thomas Gybbe
1410	Simon (Lowys)	John Clink (MP for Liskeard)
1411	Simon Lowys	John Penrose
1413 (Feb)		
1413 (May)	Simon Lowys	Walter Lowys
1414 (Apr)		
1414 (Nov)	Simon Lowys	William Bodrugan
1415		
1416 (Mar)	Oto Trenewith	John Trewoofe
1416 (Oct)		
1417	John But	Robert Treage
1419	Philip Motty	John Calwe
1420	John Fursdon	John Cork
1421 (May)	Nicholas Aysshton	Richard Tredinney
1421 (Dec)	John Trelawny III	Robert Trenerth
1510–1523	No names known	
1529	James Trewynnard	Henry Pyne
1536	?	
1539	?	
1542	?	
1545	John Roscarrock	Richard Halfacre
1547	Robert Becket	Ambrose Gilberd
First Parliament of 1553	John Trelawny	John Gayer
Second Parliament of 1553	William Morice	Thomas Roscarrock
First Parliament of 1554	James Kemp	Francis Roscarrock
Second Parliament of 1554	John Connock	John Pethbridge
Parliament of 1555	John Cruys	William Lower (MP for Liskeard)
Parliament of 1558	William Coryton	John Gayer
Parliament of 1559	George Bromley	Renald Muschamp
Parliament of 1563–1567	George Bromley	Reginald Mohun
Parliament of 1571	John Connock	Basil Johnson
Parliament of 1572–1581	Henry Macwilliam	Paul Wentworth
Parliament of 1584–1585	Peter Edgcumbe	Edward Denny
Parliament of 1586–1587	Richard Edgecumbe	Jonathan Trelawny
Parliament of 1588–1589	John Jackson	Jonathan Trelawny
Parliament of 1593	George Wray	Jonathan Trelawny
Parliament of 1597–1598	Henry Neville	Edward Trelawny
Parliament of 1601	Thomas Edmunds	Sampson Lennard
Parliament of 1604–1611	Sir William Killigrew	Reginald Nicholas
Addled Parliament (1614)	Richard Connock	John Glanville
Parliament of 1621–1622	Sir Edward Coke	Nicholas Hele
Happy Parliament (1624–1625)	William Wrey (later 2nd Wrey Baronet)	Nicholas Hele
Useless Parliament (1625)	William Coryton	Nicholas Hele
Parliament of 1625–1626	Sir Francis Steward	Joseph Jane
Parliament of 1628–1629	Sir Francis Steward	John Harris
No Parliament summoned 1629–1640

=== 1640–1832 ===
Year	First member	First party	Second member	Second party
April 1640	John Harris	Royalist	George Kekewich	Parliamentarian
November 1640	John Harris	Royalist	Joseph Jane	Royalist
January 1644	Harris and Jane disabled from sitting – both seats vacant			
1647	Thomas Povey	Non-partisan	George Kekewich	Parliamentarian
December 1648	Povey and Kekewich excluded in Pride's Purge – both seats vacant			
1653	Liskeard was unrepresented in the Barebones Parliament and the First and Second Parliaments of the Protectorate			
January 1659	Thomas Noell		Hunt Greenwood	
May 1659	Not represented in the restored Rump			
April 1660	John Connock		John Robinson	
April 1661	John Harris		Peter Prideaux (Note: Prideaux was also elected for Honiton, which he chose to represent, and never sat for Liskeard)	
May 1661	John Harris		Bernard Granville	
1678	Sir Bourchier Wrey		Bernard Granville	
February 1679	John Connock		John Buller	
August 1679	Sir Jonathan Trelawny		John Buller	
1685	Chichester Wrey		John Connock	
1689	Sir Bourchier Wrey		John Buller	
1690	Sir Bourchier Wrey		Emanuel Pyper	
1695	Sir Bourchier Wrey		William Bridges	
1696	Henry Darell		William Bridges	
1701	Thomas Dodson		William Bridges	
1707	John Dolben		William Bridges	
1710	Philip Rashleigh	Tory	William Bridges	
1715	Philip Rashleigh	Tory	Sir John Trelawny	
April 1722	Edward Eliot		John Lansdell	
November 1722	Thomas Clutterbuck		John Lansdell	
1727	Thomas Clutterbuck		Sir John Cope	
1734	Richard Eliot		George Dennis	
1740	Richard Eliot		Charles Trelawny	
1747	Sir George Lee		Charles Trelawny	
1754	Edmund Nugent		Philip Stanhope	
1759	Philip Stephens		Philip Stanhope	
1761	Philip Stephens		Anthony Champion	
1768	Edward Eliot		Samuel Salt	
1774	Edward Gibbon	Whig	Samuel Salt	
1780	Wilbraham Tollemache		Samuel Salt	
1784	Edward James Eliot		John Eliot	Tory
1797	The Earl of Inchiquin		John Eliot	Tory
1800	Lord Fincastle		John Eliot	Tory
1802	William Eliot	Tory	John Eliot	Tory
1804	William Eliot	Tory	William Huskisson	Tory
1807	William Eliot	Tory	Viscount Hamilton	Tory
1812	William Eliot	Tory	Charles Philip Yorke	Tory
1818	William Eliot	Tory	Sir William Pringle	Tory
1824	Lord Eliot	Tory	Sir William Pringle	Tory
1832	Representation reduced to one Member			

=== 1832–1885 ===
Year	Member	Party
1832	Charles Buller	Radical
1849	Richard Crowder	Radical
1854	Ralph Grey	Whig
1859	Ralph Bernal Osborne	Liberal
1865	Sir Arthur Buller	Liberal
1869	Edward Horsman	Liberal
1876	Leonard Courtney	Liberal
1885	Constituency abolished	

== Election results ==
Note on sources: The information for the election results given below is taken from Sedgwick 1715–1754, Namier and Brooke 1754–1790 and Stooks Smith 1790–1832. From 1832 the principal source was Craig, with additional or different information from Stooks Smith included. Candidates classified by Craig as Liberal before 1859, are labeled as Whig or Radical (following Stooks Smith) or Liberal if their exact allegiance is uncertain. Similarly candidates classified by Craig as Conservative but by Stooks Smith as Tory are listed below as Tory.

Note on percentage change calculations: Where there was only one candidate of a party in successive elections, for the same number of seats, change is calculated on the party percentage vote. Where there was more than one candidate for a party, in one or both successive contested elections for the same number of seats, then change is calculated on the individual candidates percentage vote.

Note on party allegiance of candidates: A party label is only used when the source used quotes one. Other candidates are labelled Non Partisan, but may have associated themselves with a tendency or faction in Parliament.

=== Elections before 1715 ===
Dates of Parliaments 1660–1715

Summoned	Elected	Opened	Dismissed
16 March 1660	1660	25 April 1660	29 December 1660
18 February 1661	1661	8 May 1661	24 January 1679
25 January 1679	1679	6 March 1679	12 July 1679
24 July 1679	1679–1680	21 October 1680	18 January 1681
20 January 1681	1681	21 March 1681	28 March 1681
14 February 1685	1685	19 May 1685	2 July 1687
29 December 1688	1688–1689	22 January 1689	6 February 1690
6 February 1690	1690	20 March 1690	11 October 1695
12 October 1695	1695	22 November 1695	6 July 1698
13 July 1698	1698	24 August 1698	19 December 1700
26 December 1700	1700–1701	6 February 1701	11 November 1701
3 November 1701	1701	30 December 1701	2 July 1702
2 July 1702	1702	20 August 1702	5 April 1705
1705	7 May – 6 June 1705	14 June 1705	see Note
1707	see Note	23 October 1707	3 April 1708
1708	30 April – 7 July 1708	8 July 1708	21 September 1710
1710	2 October – 16 November 1710	25 November 1710	8 August 1713
1713	22 August – 12 November 1713	12 November 1713	15 January 1715

Note:-

- The MPs of the Parliament of England (elected 1705) and 45 members co-opted from the former Parliament of Scotland, became the House of Commons of the 1st Parliament of Great Britain in 1707.

=== Index to Election results 1715–1799 ===
1710s – 1720s – 1730s – 1740s – 1750s – 1760s – 1770s – 1780s – 1790s

=== Index to Election results 1800–1885 ===
1800s – 1810s – 1820s – 1830s – 1840s – 1850s – 1860s – 1870s – 1880s

=== Elections in the 1710s ===
General election 29 January 1715: Liskeard (2 seats)
Party	Candidate	Votes	%	±%
Nonpartisan	John Trelawny	Unopposed	N/A	N/A
Tory	Philip Rashleigh	Unopposed	N/A	N/A

=== Elections in the 1720s ===
- Trelawny became a Baronet in 1721

General election 12 April 1722: Liskeard (2 seats)
Party	Candidate	Votes	%	±%
Nonpartisan	Edward Eliot	Unopposed	N/A	N/A
Nonpartisan	John Lansdell	Unopposed	N/A	N/A

- Death of Eliot

By-Election 2 November 1722: Liskeard
Party	Candidate	Votes	%	±%
Nonpartisan	Thomas Clutterbuck	Unopposed	N/A	N/A
Nonpartisan hold		Swing	N/A	

General election 25 August 1727: Liskeard (2 seats)
Party	Candidate	Votes	%	±%
Nonpartisan	Thomas Clutterbuck	Unopposed	N/A	N/A
Nonpartisan	John Cope	Unopposed	N/A	N/A

=== Elections in the 1730s ===
- Seat vacated on Clutterbuck being appointed a Lord of the Admiralty

By-Election 15 June 1732: Liskeard
Party	Candidate	Votes	%	±%
Nonpartisan	Thomas Clutterbuck	Unopposed	N/A	N/A
Nonpartisan hold		Swing	N/A	

- Death of Dennis

By-Election 25 March 1739: Liskeard
Party	Candidate	Votes	%	±%
Nonpartisan	Charles Trelawny	Unopposed	N/A	N/A
Nonpartisan hold		Swing	N/A	

=== Elections in the 1740s ===
General election 11 May 1741: Liskeard (2 seats)
Party	Candidate	Votes	%	±%
Nonpartisan	Richard Eliot	Unopposed	N/A	N/A
Nonpartisan	Charles Trelawny	Unopposed	N/A	N/A

General election 1 July 1747: Liskeard (2 seats)
Party	Candidate	Votes	%	±%
Nonpartisan	Charles Trelawny	Unopposed	N/A	N/A
Nonpartisan	George Lee	Unopposed	N/A	N/A

=== Elections in the 1750s ===
- Seat vacated on the appointment of Trelawny as Assay-Master of Tin for the Duchy of Cornwall

By-Election 2 July 1751: Liskeard
Party	Candidate	Votes	%	±%
Nonpartisan	Charles Trelawny	Unopposed	N/A	N/A
Nonpartisan hold		Swing	N/A	

General election 17 April 1754: Liskeard (2 seats)
Party	Candidate	Votes	%	±%
Nonpartisan	Edmund Nugent	Unopposed	N/A	N/A
Nonpartisan	Philip Stanhope	Unopposed	N/A	N/A

- Seat vacated on the appointment of Nugent to an office

By-Election 1 December 1759: Liskeard
Party	Candidate	Votes	%	±%
Nonpartisan	Philip Stephens	Unopposed	N/A	N/A
Nonpartisan hold		Swing	N/A	

=== Elections in the 1760s ===
General election 30 March 1761: Liskeard (2 seats)
Party	Candidate	Votes	%	±%
Nonpartisan	Philip Stephens	Unopposed	N/A	N/A
Nonpartisan	Anthony Champion	Unopposed	N/A	N/A

General election 22 March 1768: Liskeard (2 seats)
Party	Candidate	Votes	%	±%
Nonpartisan	Edward Eliot	Unopposed	N/A	N/A
Nonpartisan	Samuel Salt	Unopposed	N/A	N/A

=== Elections in the 1770s ===
General election 11 October 1774: Liskeard (2 seats)
Party	Candidate	Votes	%	±%
Nonpartisan	Edward Gibbon	Unopposed	N/A	N/A
Nonpartisan	Samuel Salt	Unopposed	N/A	N/A

- Seat vacated on the appointment of Gibbon to an office

By-Election 12 July 1779: Liskeard
Party	Candidate	Votes	%	±%
Nonpartisan	Philip Stephens	Unopposed	N/A	N/A
Nonpartisan hold		Swing	N/A	

=== Elections in the 1780s ===
General election 9 September 1780: Liskeard (2 seats)
Party	Candidate	Votes	%	±%
Nonpartisan	Wilbraham Tollemache	Unopposed	N/A	N/A
Nonpartisan	Samuel Salt	Unopposed	N/A	N/A

General election 5 April 1784: Liskeard (2 seats)
Party	Candidate	Votes	%	±%
Nonpartisan	Edward James Eliot	Unopposed	N/A	N/A
Nonpartisan	John Eliot	Unopposed	N/A	N/A

- Seat vacated on the appointment of E.J. Eliot as Remembrancer of the Court of Exchequer

By-Election 6 February 1786: Liskeard
Party	Candidate	Votes	%	±%
Nonpartisan	Edward James Eliot	Unopposed	N/A	N/A
Nonpartisan hold		Swing	N/A	

=== Elections in the 1790s ===
General election 1790: Liskeard (2 seats)
Party	Candidate	Votes	%	±%
Nonpartisan	Edward James Eliot	Unopposed	N/A	N/A
Nonpartisan	John Eliot	Unopposed	N/A	N/A

- Seat vacated on the appointment of E.J. Eliot as a Commissioner for India

By-Election 1793: Liskeard
Party	Candidate	Votes	%	±%
Nonpartisan	Edward James Eliot	Unopposed	N/A	N/A
Nonpartisan hold		Swing	N/A	

General election 1796: Liskeard (2 seats)
Party	Candidate	Votes	%	±%
Nonpartisan	Edward James Eliot	Unopposed	N/A	N/A
Nonpartisan	John Eliot	Unopposed	N/A	N/A

- Death of E.J. Eliot

By-Election 1797: Liskeard
Party	Candidate	Votes	%	±%
Nonpartisan	Murrough O'Brien	Unopposed	N/A	N/A
Nonpartisan hold		Swing	N/A	

- Inchiquin was a peer of Ireland

=== Elections in the 1800s ===
- Resignation of Inchiquin

By-Election 1800: Liskeard
Party	Candidate	Votes	%	±%
Nonpartisan	George Murray	Unopposed	N/A	N/A
Nonpartisan hold				

- Note (1800): Stooks Smith recorded that William Huskisson was returned unopposed at this by-election, but this appears to be an error.

General election 1802: Liskeard (2 seats)
Party	Candidate	Votes	%	±%
Tory	John Eliot	27	48.21	N/A
Tory	William Eliot	27	48.21	N/A
Whig	Thomas Sheridan	1	1.79	N/A
Whig	William Ogilvie	1	1.79	N/A
Turnout		56	N/A	N/A

- Note (1802): 48 householders claimed the right to vote. The ballots they tendered were rejected by the Mayor. 44 wanted to vote for Sheridan and Ogilvie, 3 for the Eliots and 1 for John Eliot and Sheridan.
- Succession of John Eliot as the 2nd Lord Eliot

By-Election March 1804: Liskeard
Party	Candidate	Votes	%	±%
Tory	William Huskisson	21	87.50	−8.92
Whig	Thomas Sheridan	3	12.50	+8.92
Majority		18	75.00	N/A
Turnout		24	N/A	N/A
Tory hold		Swing	N/A	

General election 1806: Liskeard (2 seats)
Party	Candidate	Votes	%	±%
Tory	William Eliot	Elected	N/A	N/A
Tory	William Huskisson	Elected	N/A	N/A
Whig	Nicholas Tomlinson	6	N/A	N/A
Whig	Alexander Nowell	1	N/A	N/A
Turnout		56	N/A	N/A

- Note (1806): Stooks Smith does not give the votes for the elected candidates.

General election 1807: Liskeard (2 seats)
Party	Candidate	Votes	%	±%
Tory	William Eliot	Unopposed	N/A	N/A
Tory	James Hamilton	Unopposed	N/A	N/A

=== Elections in the 1810s ===
General election 1812: Liskeard (2 seats)
Party	Candidate	Votes	%	±%
Tory	William Eliot	Unopposed	N/A	N/A
Tory	Charles Philip Yorke	Unopposed	N/A	N/A

General election 1818: Liskeard (2 seats)
Party	Candidate	Votes	%	±%
Tory	William Eliot	Unopposed	N/A	N/A
Tory	William Henry Pringle	Unopposed	N/A	N/A

=== Elections in the 1820s ===
General election 1820: Liskeard (2 seats)
Party	Candidate	Votes	%	±%
Tory	William Eliot	Unopposed	N/A	N/A
Tory	William Henry Pringle	Unopposed	N/A	N/A

General election 1826: Liskeard (2 seats)
Party	Candidate	Votes	%	±%
Tory	William Henry Pringle	Unopposed	N/A	N/A
Tory	Edward Eliot	Unopposed	N/A	N/A

=== Elections in the 1830s ===
General election 1830: Liskeard (2 seats)
Party	Candidate	Votes	%
Tory	William Henry Pringle	Unopposed	
Tory	Edward Eliot	Unopposed	
Tory hold			
Tory hold			

General election 1831: Liskeard (2 seats)
Party	Candidate	Votes	%
Tory	William Henry Pringle	Unopposed	
Tory	Edward Eliot	Unopposed	
Registered electors		51	
Tory hold			
Tory hold			

- Electorate expanded and constituency reduced to one seat, by the Reform Act 1832

General election 1832: Liskeard
Party	Candidate	Votes	%
Radical	Charles Buller	Unopposed	
Registered electors		218	
Radical gain from Tory			

General election 1835: Liskeard
Party	Candidate	Votes	%
Radical	Charles Buller	114	64.0
Conservative	Samuel Trehawke Kekewich	64	36.0
Majority		50	28.0
Turnout		178	82.4
Registered electors		216	
Radical hold			

- Note (1835): Stooks Smith recorded 211 registered electors, but the turnout is calculated on Craig's figure above

General election 1837: Liskeard
Party	Candidate	Votes	%	±%
Radical	Charles Buller	113	54.3	−9.7
Conservative	Samuel Trehawke Kekewich	95	45.7	+9.7
Majority		18	8.6	−19.4
Turnout		208	83.9	+1.5
Registered electors		248		
Radical hold		Swing	−9.7	

- Note (1837): Stooks Smith recorded 250 registered electors, but the turnout is calculated on Craig's figure above

=== Elections in the 1840s ===
General election 1841: Liskeard
Party	Candidate	Votes	%	±%
Radical	Charles Buller	Unopposed		
Registered electors		296		
Radical hold				

- Note (1841): Stooks Smith recorded 285 registered electors, but the turnout is calculated on Craig's figure above
- Seat vacated on the appointment of Buller as Judge-Advocate General

By-election, 15 July 1846: Liskeard
Party	Candidate	Votes	%	±%
Radical	Charles Buller	Unopposed		
Radical hold				

General election 1847: Liskeard
Party	Candidate	Votes	%	±%
Radical	Charles Buller	170	59.2	N/A
Conservative	William Curteis	117	40.8	New
Majority		53	18.4	N/A
Turnout		287	82.2	N/A
Registered electors		349		
Radical hold		Swing	N/A	

- Note (1847): Stooks Smith recorded 333 registered electors, but the turnout is calculated on Craig's figure above
- Seat vacated on the appointment of Buller as President of the Poor Law Board

By-election, 14 December 1847: Liskeard
Party	Candidate	Votes	%	±%
Radical	Charles Buller	Unopposed		
Radical hold				

- Death of Buller

By-election, 3 January 1849: Liskeard
Party	Candidate	Votes	%	±%
Radical	Richard Crowder	Unopposed		
Radical hold				

=== Elections in the 1850s ===
General election 1852: Liskeard
Party	Candidate	Votes	%	±%
Radical	Richard Crowder	Unopposed		
Registered electors		343		
Radical hold				

- Seat vacated on the appointment of Crowder as a Judge of the Court of Common Pleas

By-Election 29 March 1854: Liskeard
Party	Candidate	Votes	%	±%
Whig	Ralph Grey	138	51.5	New
Radical	John Salusbury-Trelawny	119	44.4	N/A
Whig	Joseph Haythorne Reed	11	4.1	New
Majority		19	7.1	N/A
Turnout		268	76.1	N/A
Registered electors		352		
Whig gain from Radical				

General election 1857: Liskeard
Party	Candidate	Votes	%	±%
Whig	Ralph Grey	174	58.4	N/A
Peelite	Arthur Hamilton-Gordon	124	41.6	New
Majority		50	16.8	N/A
Turnout		298	79.9	N/A
Registered electors		373		
Whig gain from Radical				

General election 1859: Liskeard
Party	Candidate	Votes	%	±%
Liberal	Ralph Grey	164	50.6	−7.8
Conservative	William Pole-Carew	160	49.4	+7.8
Majority		4	1.2	−15.6
Turnout		324	82.0	+2.1
Registered electors		395		
Liberal hold		Swing	−7.8	

- The Whig Party is regarded as having merged into a new Liberal Party, which was formed at a meeting of the supporters of Lord Palmerston on 6 July 1859; although Whigs and Radicals had been informally referred to collectively as Liberals for decades.
- Seat vacated on the appointment of Grey as a Collector of Customs

By-Election 19 August 1859: Liskeard
Party	Candidate	Votes	%	±%
Liberal	Ralph Bernal Osborne	Unopposed		
Liberal hold				

=== Elections in the 1860s ===
- Resignation of Osborne

By-election, 21 June 1865: Liskeard
Party	Candidate	Votes	%	±%
Liberal	Arthur William Buller	Unopposed		
Liberal hold				

General election 1865: Liskeard
Party	Candidate	Votes	%	±%
Liberal	Arthur William Buller	Unopposed		
Registered electors		434		
Liberal hold				

- Electorate expanded by the Reform Act 1867

General election 1868: Liskeard
Party	Candidate	Votes	%	±%
Liberal	Arthur William Buller	Unopposed		
Registered electors		881		
Liberal hold				

- Death of Buller

By-Election 11 May 1869: Liskeard
Party	Candidate	Votes	%	±%
Liberal	Edward Horsman	368	56.4	N/A
Liberal	Francis Lycett	285	43.6	N/A
Majority		83	12.8	N/A
Turnout		653	74.1	N/A
Registered electors		881		
Liberal hold		Swing	N/A	

=== Elections in the 1870s ===
General election 1874: Liskeard
Party	Candidate	Votes	%	±%
Liberal	Edward Horsman	334	50.4	N/A
Liberal	Leonard Courtney	329	49.6	N/A
Majority		5	0.8	N/A
Turnout		663	81.8	N/A
Registered electors		811		
Liberal hold		Swing	N/A	

- Death of Horsman

By-Election 22 December 1876: Liskeard
Party	Candidate	Votes	%	±%
Liberal	Leonard Courtney	388	58.0	+8.4
Conservative	John Burton Sterling	281	42.0	New
Majority		107	16.0	+15.2
Turnout		669	86.1	+4.3
Registered electors		777		
Liberal hold		Swing	N/A	

=== Elections in the 1880s ===
General election 1880: Liskeard
Party	Candidate	Votes	%	±%
Liberal	Leonard Courtney	370	55.1	+5.5
Liberal	Edward Pleydell-Bouverie	301	44.9	−5.5
Majority		69	10.2	+9.4
Turnout		671	91.2	+9.4
Registered electors		736		
Liberal hold		Swing	+5.5	

- Electorate expanded by the Representation of the People Act 1884, but the constituency was abolished by the Redistribution of Seats Act 1885 with effect from the 1885 United Kingdom general election.

== Notes and references ==
Notes

== Sources ==
- The History of Parliament Trust, Lostwithiel, Borough from 1386 to 1868
- D Brunton & D H Pennington, Members of the Long Parliament (London: George Allen & Unwin, 1954)
- Cobbett's Parliamentary history of England, from the Norman Conquest in 1066 to the year 1803 (London: Thomas Hansard, 1808)
- F W S Craig, "British Parliamentary Election Results 1832–1885" (2nd edition, Aldershot: Parliamentary Research Services, 1989)
- J Holladay Philbin, Parliamentary Representation 1832 – England and Wales (New Haven: Yale University Press, 1965)
- Boundaries of Parliamentary Constituencies 1885–1972, compiled and edited by F.W.S. Craig (Parliamentary Reference Publications 1972)
- The House of Commons 1715–1754, by Romney Sedgwick (HMSO 1970)
- The House of Commons 1754–1790, by Sir Lewis Namier and John Brooke (HMSO 1964)
- The Parliaments of England by Henry Stooks Smith (1st edition published in three volumes 1844–50), second edition edited (in one volume) by F.W.S. Craig (Political Reference Publications 1973)) out of copyright
- Who's Who of British Members of Parliament: Volume I 1832–1885, edited by M. Stenton (The Harvester Press 1976)
- Who's Who of British Members of Parliament, Volume II 1886–1918, edited by M. Stenton and S. Lees (Harvester Press 1978)
- Leigh Rayment's Historical List of MPs – Constituencies beginning with "L" (part 3)
