= 1876 Liskeard by-election =

UK Parliamentary by-election

The 1876 Liskeard by-election was fought on 22 December 1876. The by-election was fought due to the death of the incumbent Liberal MP, Edward Horsman. It was won by the Liberal candidate Leonard Courtney.

By-Election 22 December 1876: Liskeard
Party	Candidate	Votes	%	±%
Liberal	Leonard Courtney	388	58.00	+8.38
Conservative	J.B. Sterling	281	42.00	New
Majority		107	16.00	+15.20
Turnout		669	86.10	+4.35
Registered electors		777		
Liberal hold		Swing	N/A	
