= Thomas Fermore =

16th-century English politician

Thomas Fermore alias Draper or Farmer (died 1609), of Great Marlow, Buckinghamshire, was an English politician.

He was a member of parliament (MP) for Chipping Wycombe in 1563.
