= Robert Jermyn (1601–1623) =

English politician (1601–1623)

Robert Jermyn (13 September 1601 (baptised) – December 1623) was an English politician.

== Biography ==
Jermyn was the eldest son of Sir Thomas Jermyn by his first wife, Catherine Killigrew, a daughter of Sir William Killigrew. In 1617 he entered Clare College, Cambridge before obtaining a licence in June 1618 for three years' foreign travel.

In 1621, while underage, he was returned as a Member of Parliament for Penryn on the interest of his grandfather, Sir William Killigrew. He spoke once in the Commons, on 18 April 1621, when he argued that the controversial issue of tobacco imports should be settled by the Privy Council. He was likely staying at his grandfather's London townhouse when he died, unmarried, in December 1623. He was buried in St Margaret Lothbury, where he had an epitaph inscribed by Ben Jonson.

Parliament of England
Preceded by Sir William Killigrew; Sir Francis Crane	Member of Parliament for Penryn; 1621–1622; With: Sir Francis Crane	Succeeded by Edward Roberts; Sir Robert Killigrew
