= William Dolben (judge) =

English judge

Sir William Dolben KS KC
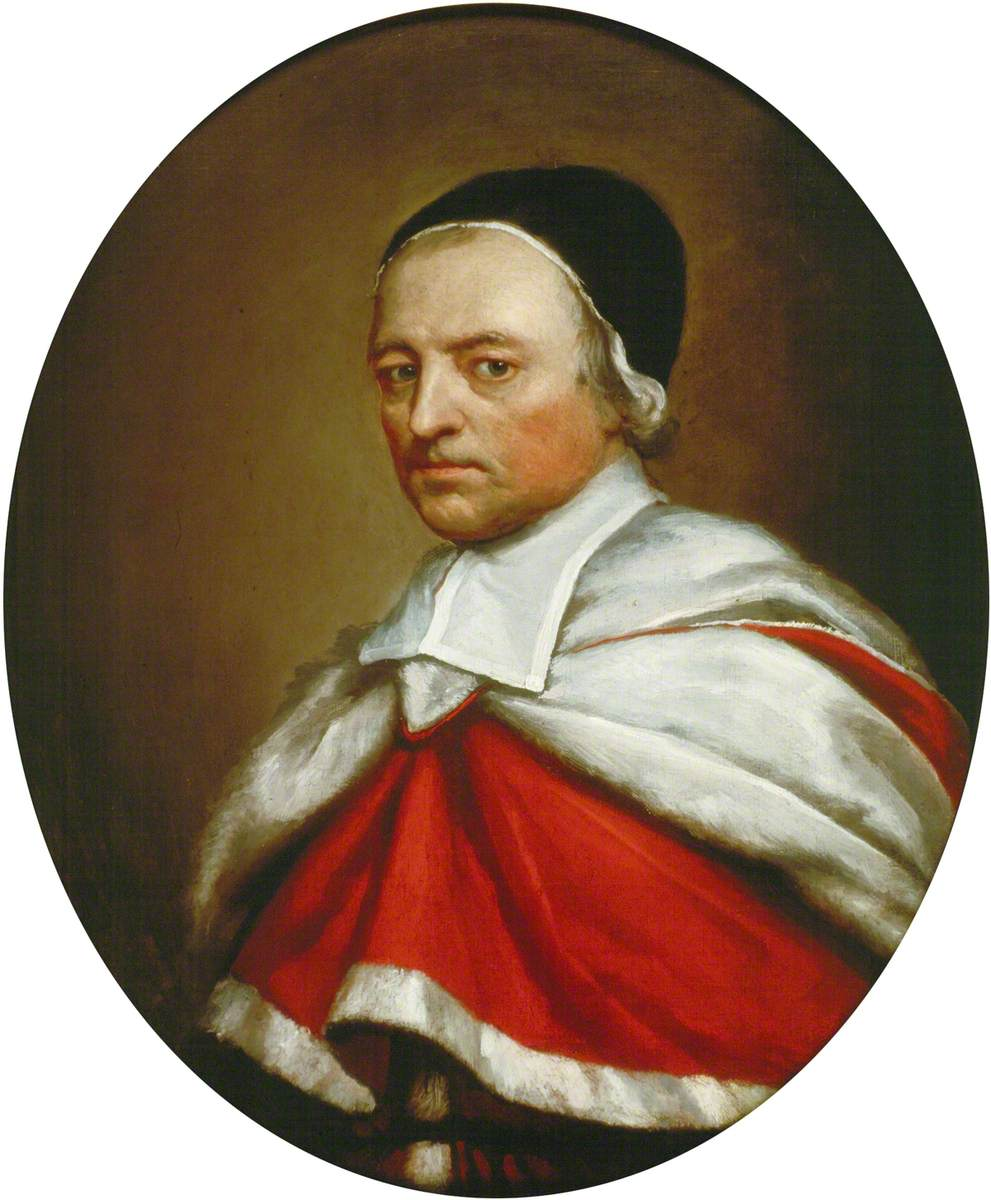

Recorder of London
- In office 1676–1678
- Preceded by: John Howell
- Succeeded by: Sir George Jeffreys

Personal details
- Born: c.27 September 1627; Stanwick, Northamptonshire
- Died: 25 January 1694

Sir William Dolben KS KC (c. 1627 – 25 January 1694) was an English judge who sat as a Justice of the King's Bench.

Born to William Dolben and his wife Elizabeth Williams, whose children also included John Dolben, later Archbishop of York, he joined the Inner Temple in 1647/8 and was called to the Bar in 1655, the same year that he graduated Master of Arts of the University of Oxford. He became a Bencher of the Inner Temple in 1672, Recorder of London in 1676, and was knighted a year later on 3 February 1677.

Dolben apparently served well as Recorder; when he was promoted a few years later, the Corporation of London gave him some silver plate "as a loving remembrance". He became a King's Counsel and King's Serjeant on 2 May and 24 October respectively, and, on 23 October 1678, became a Justice of the Court of King's Bench "during good behaviour". As both a barrister and a judge, Dolben was noted as an "arrant old snarler" with a large voice, despite his small stature, a trait that Stuart Handley notes probably served him well in court.

In the aftermath of the Popish Plot, Dolben tried many of the accused, including Sir Thomas Gascoigne, 2nd Baronet and Sir Miles Stapleton; due to his impartial trait of pointing out inconsistencies in the prosecution's evidence, both were acquitted. At the trial of Mary Pressicks, who was accused of saying that "We shall never be at peace until we are all of the Roman Catholic religion", Dolben saved her life by ruling that the words, even if she did speak them, could not amount to treason.

As a result of this and his opposition to Charles II's removal of the City Corporation's writs, he was "according to the vicious practise of the time" dismissed on 18 April 1683. Again working as a barrister, Dolben prosecuted Algernon Sidney in November 1683 before being reinstated as a Justice of the King's Bench on 18 March 1689. Records from 29 April show him "inveighing mightily against the corruption of juries [during the Glorious Revolution]", and he continued sitting as a Justice until his death from an apoplectic fit on 25 January 1694, and was buried in Temple Church.

Unmarried and with no children, he had originally intended that his estate should go to his younger nephew, John Dolben, and then to John's children, but he was so angered by John's profligate behaviour and chronic gambling that he disinherited him and settled the estate entirely on John's children.

== Bibliography ==
- Foss, Edward (1870). A Biographical Dictionary of the Justices of England (1066 - 1870). Spottiswoode and Company. OCLC 181068114.
- Sainty, John (1993). The Judges of England 1272 -1990: a list of judges of the superior courts. Oxford: Selden Society. OCLC 29670782.
