= John Cork (MP) =

English politician

John Cork (fl. 1414–1443), of Paderda in Menheniot, Cornwall, was an English member of parliament (MP).

He was a Member of the Parliament of England for Helston in 1419, Liskeard in 1420 and 1422, and Bodmin in 1423.
