= John Dolben (politician) =

English barrister and Whig politician

John Dolben (1662 – 29 May 1710), of Epsom, Surrey, was an English barrister and Whig politician who sat in the House of Commons from 1707 to 1710. He was deeply involved in the impeachment proceedings against Dr Henry Sacheverell in 1710, and his work on the impeachment is said to have contributed to his early demise.

== Early life ==
Dolben was the younger son of John Dolben, Archbishop of York, and his wife Catherine Sheldon, daughter of Ralph Sheldon of Stanton, Staffordshire, and niece of Gilbert Sheldon, Archbishop of Canterbury, and was baptised in Christ Church Cathedral, Oxford, on 1 July 1662. He was educated at Westminster School where he is listed as a pupil in 1676, and with the encouragement of his uncle Sir William Dolben, Recorder of London, was admitted at Inner Temple in 1677. He also matriculated at Christ Church, Oxford in 1678 but is not recorded as a graduate. From 1682 to 1683, he travelled abroad in France. By December 1683, he married Elizabeth Mulso, second daughter and co-heiress of Tanfield Mulso of Finedon Hall, Northamptonshire and his wife Mary Luther. Her portrait was once attributed to Sir Peter Lely, but is now thought to be the work of John Riley, completed after his death by John Closterman. He was called to the bar in 1684.

Dolben, whose father died in April 1686, squandered his inheritance on gambling. He also squandered his wife's fortune, selling his moiety of the manor of Finedon around this time to his elder brother, Sir Gilbert Dolben, 1st Baronet, who had married John's sister-in-law, Anne Mulso. In 1691, Sir Gilbert wrote that John's wife and children were reduced to living on the charity of friends. He also complained that their father's memory was being unfairly traduced, as critics said that John's conduct was the result of a bad upbringing. Their uncle Sir William Dolben, who had intended to leave a legacy to John Dolben, was so outraged by his profligacy that he cut him out of his will, and settled the legacy in trust for John's children.

== Career ==
In 1692, Dolben moved to the East Indies, where he became judge-advocate for the East India Company in Bengal and was later a friend of Thomas Pitt, the Governor. He was able to profit by the trading opportunities available to repair his fortune. He went on a voyage to China in 1699 with one of Pitt's sons. By July 1701, he returned to England and corresponded with Pitt on the affairs of the East India Companies. In about 1702 he went back to the East Indies until 1706. Back in England, he was trusted by Pitt to conduct his affairs.

Dolben was returned as Member of Parliament for Liskeard on the interest of Sir Jonathan Trelawny, 3rd Baronet, Bishop of Winchester at a by-election on 21 November 1707. He immediately proved to be a conscientious MP, and was active on ten committees. Most important of these was the bill to extend the East India Company Act and he was particularly concerned about uniting the two East India companies. He put forward a proposal which involved increasing the company's loan to the government by £200,000 and the bill passed into law. He was suspected of working towards replacing Pitt as Governor, but after he reported to Pitt the successful unification of the two companies, he noted that the Company was enraged at the extra sum which he was seen being responsible for imposing on it.

At the 1708 British general election Dolben was returned unopposed for Liskeard again and continued to be very active. He was named to nine drafting committees, including the bill to prevent wagers relating to the public. In spite of this, Dolben himself was still an avid gambler and was forecast to be required to make another trip to the Indies to recover his fortune. He managed a bill to establish a company trading in Africa, and was a teller for the Whigs on ten occasions. He voted for naturalizing the German Palatines in 1709 and was trustee for poor Palatines.

It was Dolben who first raised the issue of Henry Sacheverell's printed sermons on 13 December 1709, moving that the House should take the matter into consideration, and that the sermons should be voted 'malicious, scandalous and seditious libels'. In the debate on the next day, he moved that Sacheverell should be impeached. He was appointed to the committee to draw up the articles of impeachment, and acted as chairman. At the trial itself, he acted as one of the managers. He got into some difficulties from his conduct during the trial, while the mob threatened to burn down his house and hang him on a tree. The mob pulled down the clock at Liskeard Town Hall which he had presented to the town. As well as showing great energy in this role, he was active in other Parliamentary business, including sitting on committees and telling for the Whigs. He was also appointed a Director of the Bank of England in 1710.

== Literature of the Sacheverell trial ==
Among the pamphlets relating to Dolben are:

- A Letter written by Mr. J. Dolbin to Dr. Henry Sacheverell, and left by him with a friend at Epsom, 1710, p. 16; composed as a letter of repentance.
- A true Defence of Henry Sacheverell, D.D., in a Letter to Mr. D——n [Dolben]. By S. M. N. O., 1710.
- An Elegy on the lamented Death of John Dolben.
- The Life and Adventures of John Dolben, 1710, pp. 16.

== Later life and legacy ==
Dolben worked himself to the point where his health gave way, and he retired to the country. He also gave up the directorship of the Bank of England. He then contracted a fever, and it was said he was worse treated by his physicians than by the mob, and died on 29 May 1710, unlamented by Dr Sacheverell’s friends. He was buried in Finedon Church under a large grey-marble tombstone. His two sons died abroad in his lifetime (William, the elder, whose portrait was painted by Godfrey Kneller in 1709 and engraved by Smith in 1710, dying in 1709, aged 20), and Mary, one of his three daughters, died on 24 June 1710, aged 8. His widow survived until 4 March 1736. Their two surviving daughters, Anne and Catherine, were married in Westminster Abbey. Anne married the politician Gilbert Affleck of Dalham Hall, Suffolk, and Catherine married Samuel Whitelocke, grandson of Bulstrode Whitelocke.

Parliament of Great Britain
| Preceded by Parliament of England | Member of Parliament for Liskeard; 1707–1710; With: William Bridges | Succeeded by William Bridges; Philip Rashleigh |
