= John Gayer (MP) =

16th-century English politician

John Gayer (by 1532 – 1571 or later), of St Mawes and Trenbrace in St Keverne, Cornwall, was an English lawyer and politician.

He was a member (MP) of the parliament of England for Liskeard in March 1553, for Newport, Cornwall in October 1553, for Penryn in 1559 and for Helston in 1571.
