= Anna Konik =

Anna Konik (born 1974 in Lubliniec, Poland) is a contemporary artist. She makes video installations, objects; her practice combines video, photography, drawing, sculpture. She lives and works in Berlin.

== Biography ==
Konik studied at the Faculty of Sculpture of the Academy of Fine Arts in Warsaw, and was an actress of the Academy Theater in Warsaw. She studied in the workshops of Krzysztof M. Bednarski (1996/1997) and prof. Grzegorz Kowalski (1997/2000). Konik's work includes video installations, objects, video art, photography, and drawings.

In 2010 and 2011 she cooperated as a guest with the Fashion Design Faculty at the Design Department of the Warsaw Academy of Fine Arts. In 2012 she took the doctor's degree at the Department of Media and Scenography of the Warsaw Academy of Fine Arts.
