= Philip Rashleigh (1689–1736) =

- Born: 1689; Menabilly, near Fowey, Cornwall, England
- Died: 12 August 1736 (aged 46–47)
- Education: Winchester College, New College, Oxford
- Occupations: landowner and politician
- Known for: MP (1710–1722)
- Notable work: rebuilt Menabilly House circa 1710–1715
- Spouse: unmarried
- Parents: Jonathan Rashleigh (father); Jane Carew (mother)

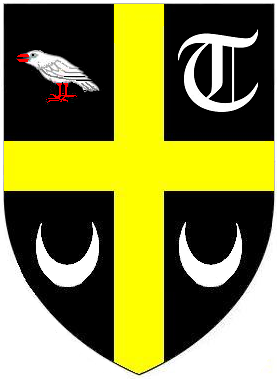
Arms of Rashleigh: Sable, a cross or between in the first quarter: a Cornish chough, argent beaked and legged gules; in the second quarter: a text "T"; in the third and fourth quarters: a crescent all of the third

Philip Rashleigh (1689–1736) of Menabilly, near Fowey, Cornwall, was a British landowner and politician who sat in the House of Commons from 1710 to 1722.

== Early life ==
Rashleigh was the eldest surviving son of Jonathan Rashleigh MP, of Menabilly and his second wife Jane Carew, a daughter of Sir John Carew, 3rd Baronet of Antony, Torpoint, Cornwall. He succeeded to his father’s estates in 1702, when still a minor and was under the guardianship of his uncles. He was educated at Winchester College from 1704 to 1706 and matriculated at New College, Oxford on 4 September 1707, aged 18.

== Career ==
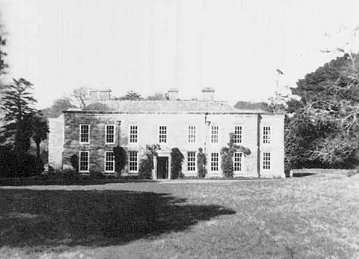
Menabilly House

Rashleigh was returned unopposed as Member of Parliament for Liskeard at the 1710 general election. He was an inactive MP and was classed as a Tory. He was returned unopposed again at the 1713 general election, and at the 1715 general election. He was a Tory and in 1715 a treasonable pamphlet was addressed to him which was seized on government orders in the post at Exeter. He did not stand at the 1722 general election.

Rashleigh rebuilt Menabilly House circa 1710–1715.

== Death and legacy ==
Rashleigh died unmarried on 12 August 1736, and his estates were inherited by his younger brother Jonathan.

Parliament of Great Britain
Preceded by John Dolben; William Bridges	Member of Parliament for Liskeard; 1710–1722; With: William Bridges (1710–15); Sir John Trelawny, Bt (1715-22)	Succeeded by Edward Eliot; John Lansdell
