= Henry Pyne (MP for Liskeard) =

16th-century English politician

Henry Pyne (1504/5 – 1556 or later), of Ham in Morwenstow, Cornwall, was an English politician.

He was a Member (MP) of the Parliament of England for Liskeard in 1529.
