= John Eliot, 1st Earl of St Germans =

British politician (1761-1823)

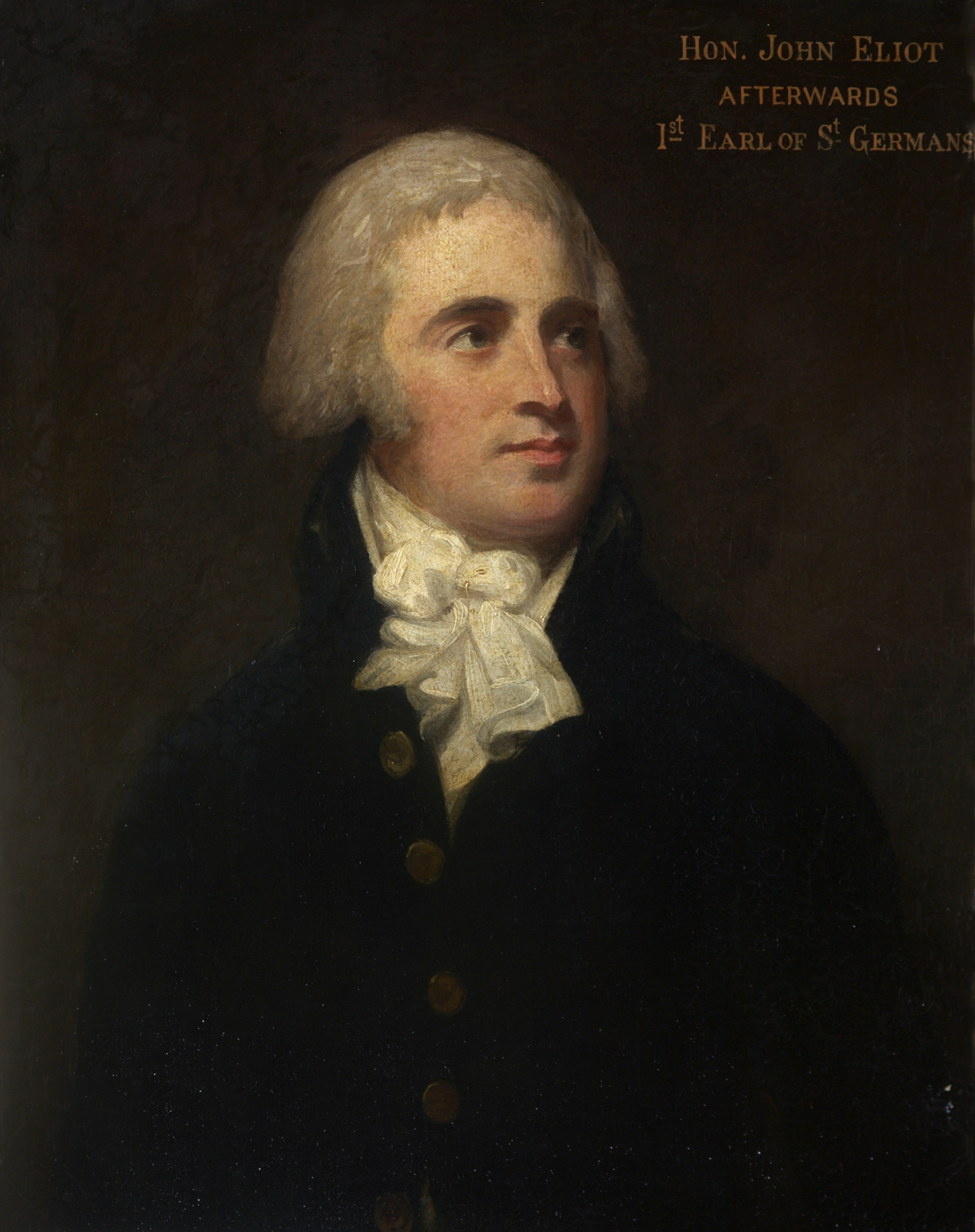

Member of Parliament for Liskeard
- In office 1784–1804 Serving with Edward James Eliot (1784-1797); The Earl of Inchiquin (1797-1800); Lord Fincastle (1800-1802); William Eliot (1802-1804)
- Preceded by: Wilbraham Tollemache; Samuel Salt
- Succeeded by: William Huskisson; William Eliot

Baron Eliot
- In office 17 February 1804 – 1823
- Preceded by: Edward Craggs-Eliot

Earl of St Germans
- In office 28 November 1815 – 1823
- Succeeded by: William Eliot

Personal details
- Born: 30 September 1761 Port Eliot, Cornwall, England
- Died: 17 November 1823 (aged 62) Port Eliot, Cornwall, England
- Resting place: St Germans Church
- Spouses: Lady Caroline Yorke (m. 1790; died 1818); Harriet Pole-Carew (m. 1819)
- Parents: Edward Craggs-Eliot (father); Catherine Elliston (mother)
- Relatives: Edward James Eliot (brother); William Eliot (brother); Charles Yorke (father-in-law); Reginald Pole-Carew (father-in-law)
- Education: Pembroke College, Cambridge

John Eliot, 1st Earl of St Germans (30 September 1761 – 17 November 1823), known as the Lord Eliot from 1804 to 1815, was a British politician.

Port Eliot, St Germans, the Eliot family seat

Eliot was born at Port Eliot, Cornwall, the third son (second surviving) of Edward Craggs-Eliot, 1st Baron Eliot, and his wife Catherine Elliston. He was educated at Pembroke College, Cambridge, taking an M.A. in 1784. He served was Member of Parliament from 1784 to 1804 for Liskeard. He also held the position of His Majesty's Remembrancer in the Court of the Exchequer. On 17 February 1804 he succeeded his father as second Baron Eliot. In 1808 he became Colonel of the East Cornwall Militia, and in 1810, Lieutenant-Colonel Commandant.

On 28 November 1815, Eliot was created Earl of Saint Germans, in the County of Cornwall, with a special remainder to his brother William Eliot and his heirs male. In February 1816 he took his seat in the House of Lords.

== Family ==
John married twice but without issue:

1. On 9 September 1790 at St James Church, Westminster to Caroline Yorke (29 August 1765 – 26 July 1818). Caroline was a daughter of Charles Yorke, Lord High Chancellor of Great Britain.
2. On 19 August 1819 to Harriet Pole-Carew (9 February 1790 – 4 March 1877). She was the daughter of Reginald Pole-Carew.

Lord St Germans died on 17 November 1823 at Port Eliot, and was buried on 27 November at St Germans Church. He was succeeded by his brother William Eliot, 2nd Earl of St Germans.

Parliament of Great Britain
Preceded by Samuel Salt and Wilbraham Tollemache	Member of Parliament for Liskeard; 1784–1800; With: Edward James Eliot 1784–1797; The Earl of Inchiquin, 1797–1800; Lord Fincastle, 1800)	Succeeded by (Parliament of Great Britain abolished)
Parliament of the United Kingdom
Preceded by (self in Parliament of Great Britain)	Member of Parliament for Liskeard; 1801–1804; With: Lord Fincastle 1801–1802; William Eliot 1802–1804	Succeeded by William Eliot; William Huskisson
Peerage of the United Kingdom
New creation	Earl of St Germans; 1815–1823	Succeeded by William Eliot
Peerage of Great Britain
Preceded by Edward Craggs-Eliot	Baron Eliot; 1804–1823	Succeeded by William Eliot
