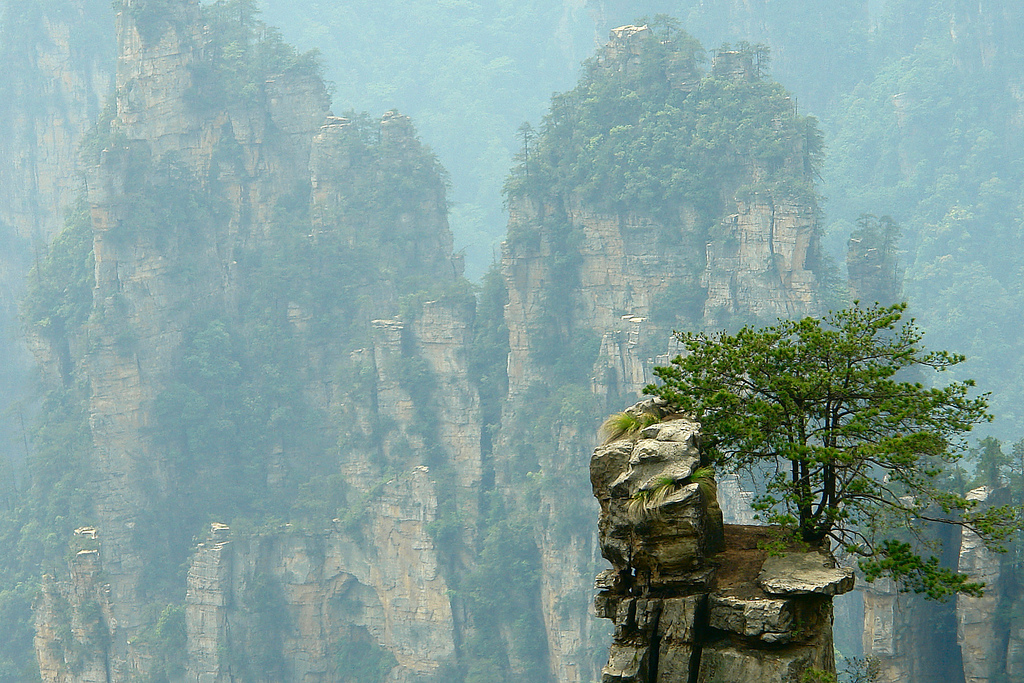

Conservation status
- Near Threatened (IUCN 3.1)

Scientific classification
- Kingdom: Plantae
- Clade: Tracheophytes
- Clade: Gymnosperms
- Division: Pinophyta
- Class: Pinopsida
- Order: Pinales
- Family: Pinaceae
- Genus: Pinus
- Subgenus: P. subg. Pinus
- Section: P. sect. Pinus
- Subsection: P. subsect. Pinus
- Species: P. henryi

Binomial name
- Pinus henryi Mast.

Synonyms
- Homotypic Synonyms: Pinus massoniana var. henryi (Mast.) C.L.Wu; Pinus tabuliformis var. henryi (Mast.) C.T.Kuan; Pinus tabuliformis subsp. henryi (Mast.) Businský; Heterotypic Synonyms: Pinus massoniana var. wulingensis C.J.Qi & Q.Z.Lin; Pinus massoniana subsp. wulingensis (C.J.Qi & Q.Z.Lin) Silba

= Pinus henryi =

Species of plant

Pinus henryi, or Henry's pine, is a pine, a species of conifer in the family Pinaceae. It is endemic to China.

== Description ==
Pinus henryi is a monoecious coniferous tree, reaching up to 30 metres (98 feet) tall and 100 centimetres (39 inches) diameter at breast height, typically with a single straight trunk. The bark on mature P. henryi is scaly, fissured, and broken into large irregular plates, which are gray-brown in color and flaky. The twigs are thick, with new shoots appearing reddish-brown in color. The needles are 7–12 cm (3–4 1/2 in) long and in fascicles of 2, persisting for 2–3 years before falling off. Pollen cones appear in clusters at the base of new shoots, and are only 2 cm long. Seed cones are thin and woody, and bear a short stout spine.

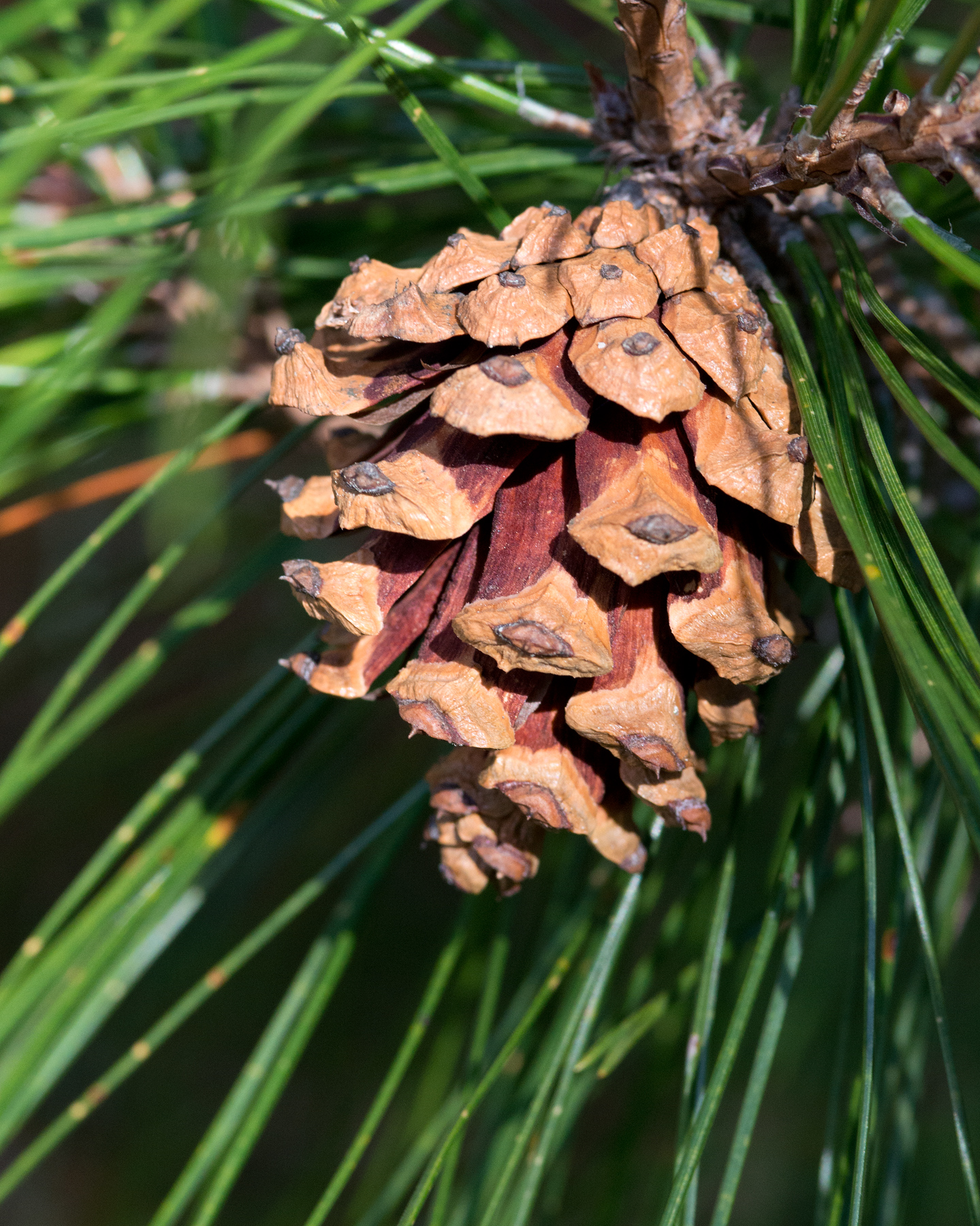
A mature cone on P. henryi at the Arnold Arboretum

== Distribution ==
Pinus henryi is typically considered to be endemic to China, found in the Chongqing, Hubei, Hunan, Shaanxi, and Sichuan provinces. Some sources also place it in the Vietnamese provinces of Ha Giang and Bac Kan. P. henryi occurs in subtropical mountains, typically at elevations of 1,100–2,000 m (3,600–6,600 ft), primarily on dry, sunny slopes.
