= John Dolben =

English priest and Church of England bishop and archbishop (1625–1686)

The Most Reverend John Dolben
- Archbishop of York
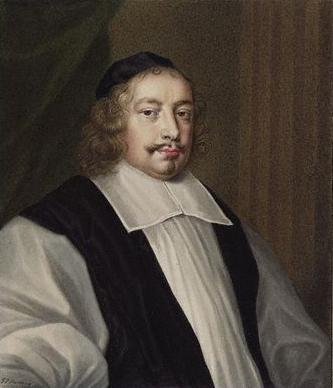
- Archdiocese: York
- Installed: 1683
- Term ended: 1686
- Predecessor: Richard Sterne
- Successor: Thomas Lamplugh
- Other posts: Dean of Westminster, Bishop of Rochester

Orders
- Consecration: 25 November 1666 by Gilbert Sheldon

Personal details
- Born: 1625
- Died: 1686 (aged 60–61)

John Dolben (1625-1686) was an English priest and Church of England bishop and archbishop.

== Life ==
=== Early life ===
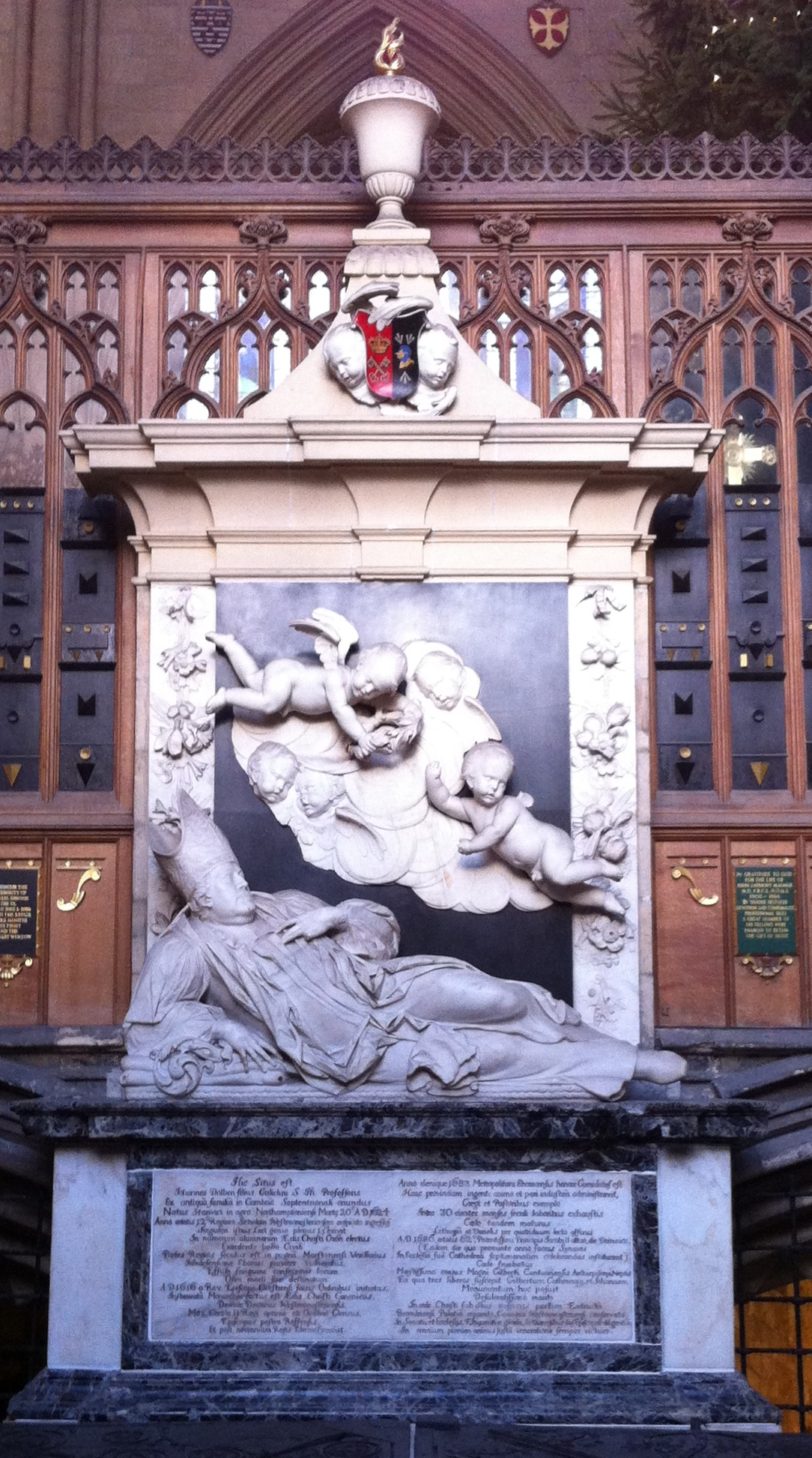
Memorial dating from 1688 to Archbishop John Dolben in York Minster by Grinling Gibbons

He was the son of William Dolben (died 1631), prebendary of Lincoln and bishop-designate of Gloucester, and Elizabeth Williams, niece of John Williams, Archbishop of York. The leading judge Sir William Dolben was his brother.

He was educated at Westminster School under Richard Busby and at Christ Church, Oxford. He fought on the Royalist side at the Battle of Marston Moor, in 1644, and in the defence of York, and was wounded twice. By 1646, like most of the Royalists, he had abandoned all hope of victory and resumed his studies. In 1648 he was removed from the Christ Church by the Parliamentary Visitations.

Subsequently, he took orders and maintained in private the proscribed Anglican service; during these years he lived at St Aldates, Oxford, home of his wife's father Ralph (or Richard) Sheldon, brother of the future Archbishop Sheldon.

=== Bishop ===
At the Restoration, he became canon of Christ Church (1660) and prebendary of St Paul's, London (1661), no doubt partly due to the influence of Sheldon, now Bishop of London. As Dean of Westminster (1662-1683), he opposed an attempt to bring the abbey under diocesan rule. His charm, eloquence, generosity and frankness gained him enormous popularity. In 1664 he was appointed Clerk of the Closet (until 1668) and in 1666 was made Bishop of Rochester. The fall of his friend Edward Hyde, 1st Earl of Clarendon the next year is said to have caused him to be in temporary disgrace, but he was quickly restored to favour. In 1675 he was appointed Lord High Almoner and in 1683 he was made Archbishop of York; he distinguished himself by reforming the discipline of the cathedrals in these dioceses. He was the first president of the Corporation of the Sons of the Clergy when it received its Royal Charter in 1678.

=== Death and family ===
At Easter 1686, returning to York from London, he came into contact with a smallpox victim, caught the infection and died a few days later. His last months are said to have been greatly troubled by King James II's attempts to re-establish the Roman Catholic faith.

He married Catherine Sheldon, a niece of Gilbert Sheldon, Archbishop of Canterbury; her father was Ralph Sheldon of Stanton, Staffordshire. He had two sons, Gilbert, judge of the Court of Common Pleas (Ireland) and first of the Dolben baronets, and John Dolben, a well-known politician. A daughter named Catherine died in infancy. From a letter Gilbert wrote in 1691 it seems that the Archbishop was much troubled in his last years by John's profligate behaviour: he was a confirmed gambler who went through all his money, and then lost the fortune he had gained by marriage to the heiress Elizabeth Mulso. His uncle the judge disinherited him, and by 1691 his wife and children were living on the charity of friends. According to Gilbert, his father's enemies happily seized on this family tragedy as evidence that the Archbishop was a bad or neglectful parent.

The Archbishop Dolben cup presented at the York International 9s rugby league festival is named after John Dolben.

== In literature ==
John Dryden, in his poem Absalom and Achitophel, mentions Dolben, describing him as:

"Him of the Western dome, whose weighty sense
Flows in fit words and heavenly eloquence."

== Arms ==
Coat of arms of John Dolben

Notes
When Dolben was serving as a bishop his arms would be displayed impaled with the arms of the diocese and topped by a mitre.
Escutcheon
Sable a close helmet between three spear-heads points fesswards Argent.

Church of England titles
Preceded by John Earle	Dean of Westminster; 1662–1683	Succeeded by Thomas Sprat
Preceded by John Warner	Bishop of Rochester; 1666–1683	Succeeded by Francis Turner
Preceded by Richard Sterne	Archbishop of York; 1683–1686	Vacant Title next held by Thomas Lamplugh
