= Connick =

Connick is a surname. Notable people with the surname include:

- Charles Connick (1875–1945), prominent American stained glass artist
- Harry Connick Jr. (born 1967), American singer, musician, and actor, son of Harry Connick Sr.
- Harry Connick Sr. (1926–2024), New Orleans district attorney and part-time singer
  - Connick v. Myers, a 1983 U.S. Supreme Court decision in a lawsuit brought against Harry Connick Sr.
- Patrick Connick (born 1961), Republican member of the Louisiana House of Representatives
- Robert E. Connick (1917–2014), a professor emeritus of chemistry at the University of California, Berkeley
- Seán Connick (born 1963), Irish Fianna Fáil politician
