= Richard Connock =

English politician

Richard Connock (died c. 1620) of Calstock, Cornwall, was an English politician.

He was a member (MP) of the parliament of England for Bodmin in 1593 and Liskeard in 1614.
