= William Dolben =

Welsh clergyman (c. 1588–1631)

William Dolben (c. 1588 – 1631) was a Welsh clergyman.

== Life ==
Dolben was born in Pembrokeshire and was educated at Westminster School and Christ Church, Oxford, graduating with a BA degree in 1607 and an MA degree (as from All Souls College, Oxford) in 1610. He obtained his BD degree in 1617 and his DD degree in 1619. After his ordination, he was the incumbent of two benefices in Pembrokeshire: Stackpool Elidyr (1616) and Lawrenny (1620), becoming rector of Llanynys, Denbighshire in 1623. He was (for about four months in 1623) the rector of St Bartholomew-by-the-Exchange before becoming rector of both Stanwick and Benefield in Northamptonshire on 8 November 1623. His marriage in 1623 to Elizabeth Williams, niece of John Williams (who was at the time Bishop of Lincoln, and who was to become Archbishop of York), helped him to be appointed to the Lincoln prebend of Caistor. He maintained connections with Pembrokeshire, still possessing the rectory of Stackpool when he died in 1631 at the age of 42. He was buried at Stanwick. He was survived by two sons: John Dolben, later Archbishop of York, and William Dolben, a judge.
