= John Connock =

16th-century English politician

John Connock was an English politician who sat in the House of Commons at various times between 1554 and 1571.

Connock was a tanner from Wiltshire. He was appointed receiver of the Duchy of Cornwall and acquired extensive properties at Liskeard at the time of the dissolution of the monasteries.

In 1554, Connock was elected Member of Parliament for Liskeard. He was re-elected MP for Liskeard in 1571.
