= Eliot family (South England) =

House of Eliot
- Noble family
- Arms of the Eliot Family
- Country: United Kingdom: England
- Earlier spellings: Aliot, Elyot, Elliott
- Founded: 1066; 960 years ago
- Founder: Sir William de Aliot
- Current head: Albert Eliot, 11th Earl of St Germans
- Titles: Earl of St Germans; Baron Eliot; Count Eliot
- Connected families: American Eliot Family; Canadian Eliot Family
- Estate: Port Eliot

The Eliot family is a British aristocratic family whose members include earls, barons, counts, knights, governors, peers, and Members of Parliament. The main factions are the Earls of St Germans and the Eliot Military Family, which encompasses the Count Eliots.

== History ==
It is unknown exactly when the Eliots settled in Devon; however, it is estimated they prospered there for 8 to 10 generations. The earliest written record of the surname is an indenture signed in 1400 by RYC Elyot. John Eliot of Devonshire (born 1375) is a common ancestor for all Eliots of South England. He had two sons, Mychell (born 1414) and Walter (born 1433). Mychell's family took residence in East Coker while Walter remained in Devon. Walter's son William married Joan Coteland, daughter and heir of Nicholas Coteland of Cutland. In 1480 they had a son John Eliot of Cutland who married Joan Bonville, granddaughter of William Bonville, 1st Baron Bonville. Edward Eliot of Cutland (died 1522) was third cousins with Sir Thomas Elyot, son of Sir Richard Elyot and descendant of Mychell Eliot.

During the reign of King Henry VIII the Eliot family gained significant wealth through privateering. In 1564 John Eliot, son of Edward Eliot of Cutland, purchased the priory of St Germans and the family relocated from Devon to St Germans, Cornwall. The priory was renamed Port Eliot and experienced significant expansion with many farms and cottages being added to the property. The main house features 123 rooms, 13 staircases, and 83 chimneys.

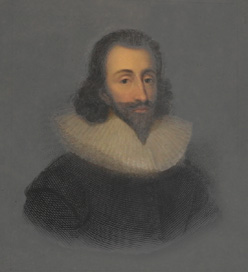
Sir John Eliot

Sir John Eliot was born at Port Eliot on April 11, 1592. Quickly rising to political power, he was a prominent advocate for the rights of Parliament. His serial imprisonment at the Tower of London by King Charles I and the suspicious circumstances surrounding his death in 1632 were important catalysts in the growing dispute between parliament and the king. After Sir John's death, Port Eliot was passed to his eldest son John Eliot (1612–1685). However, his sons Daniel Eliot (1646–1702) and Richard Eliot (1652–1685) both died without male heirs, causing confusion as to who would inherit Port Eliot. Sir John's second son Richard Eliot (1614-1685) only had an illegitimate son, while Sir John's third son Edward Eliot (1618–1710) also died without an heir. The port was inherited by Edward Eliot (died 1723), the grandson of Sir John's youngest son Nicholas Eliot. Following Edward's death in 1723 the port was passed to his brother Richard Eliot (died 1748).

=== Earls of St Germans ===
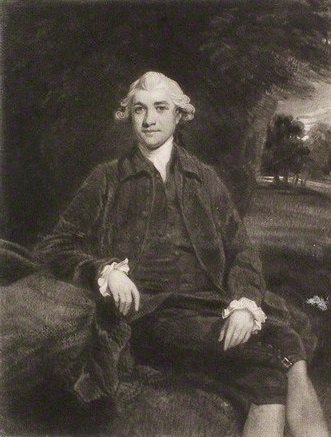
Edward Craggs-Eliot, 1st Baron Eliot

Edward Eliot (1727–1804), the son of Richard Eliot (1694–1748), served as Member of Parliament for St Germans, Liskeard, and Cornwall, as well as commissioner of the Board of Trade and Plantations. He remained in the House of Commons until 1784, when he entered the Peerage of Great Britain as Baron Eliot. In 1789 he assumed the additional surname Craggs, after his mother Harriot Craggs. When he died the barony was passed to his oldest living son, Lord John Eliot (1761–1823). In 1815 King George III created him Earl of St Germans, a title that he passed to his brother William Eliot, 2nd Earl of St Germans and heirs male of his body. Montague Eliot, 8th Earl of St Germans was Gentleman Usher to both King Edward VII and King George V, as well as Groom-in-Waiting for Edward VII and Extra-Groom-in-Waiting for George V, Edward VIII, George VI, and Elizabeth II. The title is currently held by Albert Eliot, 11th Earl of St Germans, the heir presumptive is Hon. Louis Eliot.

=== Eliot Military Family ===
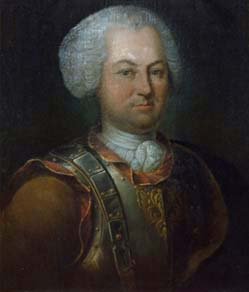
Granville Elliott, 1st Count Elliott

Richard Eliot (1614–85) and Catherine Killigrew (1618–89) had an illegitimate son George Elliott (1636–68), who became surgeon or doctor to the Tangier Garrison. His descendants continued ties with the British military. George's son Roger Elliott (1665–1714) was appointed Governor of Gibraltar and married Charlotte Elliot, the sister-in-law of Sir Gilbert Eliott, 3rd Baronet, of Stobs. George Augustus Eliott, 1st Baron Heathfield was his nephew. The marriage helped bring this branch of the family back to prominence after the relative obscurity of Richard and George.

Roger's son, Granville Elliott (1713–59) rose to the rank of Major General and married Jeanne Thérèse du Han (1703–48), a lady of honour for the Empress of Germany. Granville was appointed Chamberlain for Emperor Charles VI, made Count of the Empire, and Comte de Morhange. Granville spent a large amount of time and effort attempting to prove Richard Eliot and Catherine Killigrew had married prior to George's birth, making Granville the rightful heir to Sir John and Port Eliot. Despite his attempt failing in London, Granville was given the title Graf von Port Eliot at the court of Lorraine. In 1750, following the death of his first wife, Granville returned to England, remarried to Elizabeth Duckett (1724–1804), and started an English family. Granville was also responsible for changing the surname back to the spelling "Eliot", which he named the children of his second marriage. He commanded Colonel Elliott's Regiment of Foot. Granville died in 1759 following wounds incurred at the Battle of Minden in Germany.

Granville's eldest English son, Francis Perceval Eliot, had 7 sons that kept the family strongly tied to the military, at least 4 fought alongside each other at the Battle of Vimeiro. His eldest son Lieut-Col. William Granville Eliot (1779–1855) wrote "A Treatise on The Defence of Portugal". His second son, Francis Breynton Eliot (1781–1855), became a captain in the early Canadian Army. Documentation undertaken by his third son Edward John Eliot (1782–1863) forms an important record of military life during the early 1800s. His fourth son, Lieut-Col. George Augustus Eliot (1784–1835) fought in the RSC in Canada. His sixth son, Henry Algernon Eliot (1790–1857) became a Rear Admiral, RN. Francis Perceval Eliot raised two regiments of militia - the Staffordshire Yeomanry Cavalry (1794) and the Staffordshire Yeomanry Infantry (1798). In 1814, Francis Perceval Eliot succeeded his older half-brother as Count Eliot but felt it was not proper to assume the title.

== Connected Families ==
=== American Eliot Family ===
Between 1668 and 1670 Andrew Eliot and his son, also named Andrew Eliot, immigrated from East Coker to Beverly, Massachusetts. Moving to Boston, the family gained significant wealth and influence. Members of the Boston Brahmins, the Eliots played a significant role in shaping the American education system. Notable members include Samuel Eliot (banker), Harvard president Charles William Eliot, Washington University founder William Greenleaf Eliot, Reed College founder Thomas Lamb Eliot, Nobel Prize winning poet T. S. Eliot, and Charles Eliot (landscape architect).

=== Canadian Eliot Family ===
Francis Breynton Eliot, the second son of Francis Perceval Eliot, immigrated to Canada sometime in the mid-1800s. The family remained closely tied to the British Military, residing directly across from the Department of National Defence on Elgin Street. The most notable member is Charles William John Eliot. A portrait of Sarah Granville Eliot by Prudence Heward hangs in the National Gallery of Canada.

== Arms ==
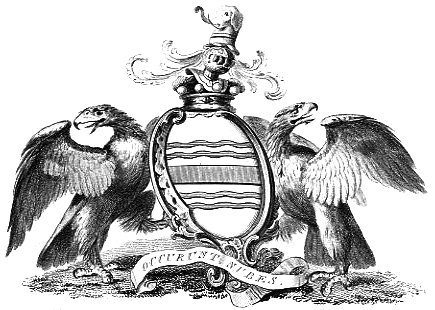
Heraldic achievement of the Earl of St Germans

The shield of the Eliot family is argent and features a fess gules between wavy azure double-cotises. The crest is an elephant head couped argent, collared glues. Eagles with expanded wings are traditionally used as supporters by the Earl of St. Germans.

The motto of the Eliot family changes depending on the faction. The Earl of St. Germans uses “præcedentibus insta”, meaning “press close upon those in the lead.” Count Eliot used a passage from The Book of the Governor by Sir Thomas Elyot, “fac aut tace” which translates to “do or be silent”. Other branches feature the motto given to Sir William de Aliot by William the Conqueror, “per saxa, per igneous, fortiter et recte”, although this is predominantly used by Clan Elliot.

== Other interests ==
Descendants of the Eliot military family owned land in the Forest Hill and Brockley area. Several roads in Forest Hill are named after the family. Eliot Bank & St Germans Road. Confusingly there is a pub on the corner of St German's Road which was originally named the St Germain's Hotel (Now renamed The Honor Oak).The pub took its name from St German's Road which is now called Honor Oak Park.
