= Roger Elliott (British Army officer) =

British Governor of Gibraltar

Major-general Roger Elliott
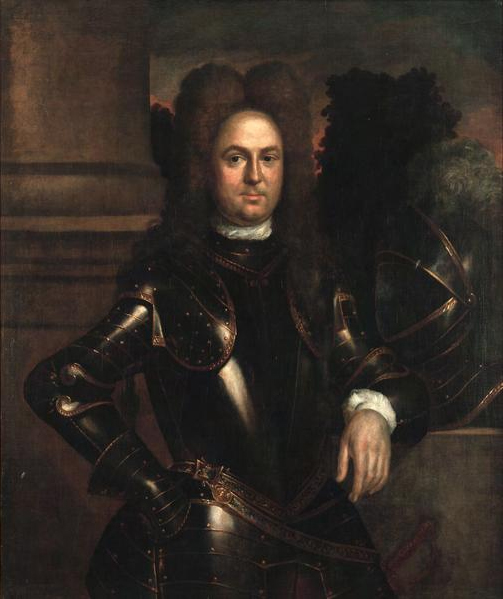
- Portrait, c. 1710
- Born: c. 1665; English Tangier, North Africa, or City of London, England
- Died: 16 May 1714 (aged 49); Byfeld House, Barnes, Surrey, England
- Burial place: St Mary the Virgin, Barnes
- Spouse: Charlotte Elliot (m. 1712–1714)
- Military career
- Allegiance: Kingdom of England; Kingdom of Great Britain
- Branch: Army
- Rank: Major-general
- Conflicts: 1692: Battle of Steenkerque; 1702: defence of Tongeren; 1704: Battle of Schellenberg

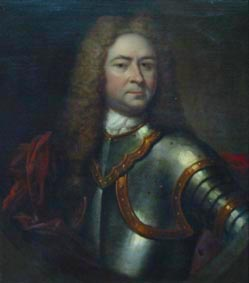
Roger Elliott c. 1665-1714 with permission from The Eliot Archives

Major-general Roger Elliott (c. 1665 – 16 May 1714) was one of the earliest British Governors of Gibraltar. A member of the Eliot family, his son Granville Elliott became the first Count Elliott and his nephew George Augustus Eliott also became a noted Governor and defender of Gibraltar.

== Early life ==
Roger Elliott was born, possibly in London but more probably in the English Colony of Tangier in Morocco, to George Elliott (c. 1636 – 1668, the Chirurgeon to the Tangier Garrison) and his wife Catherine (née Maxwell, c. 1638 – 1709). George Elliott was the illegitimate son of Richard Eliot, the wayward second son of Sir John Eliot (1592–1632).

Roger Elliott's father, George Elliott, died at Tangier in 1668, and his widowed mother remarried there on 22 February 1670 to Robert Spotswood (17 September 1637 – 1680), the assistant and replacement Chirurgeon at the Garrison, and thirdly the Rev. Dr George Mercer, the Garrison schoolmaster. Roger Elliott was therefore an older half-brother of Alexander Spotswood (c. 1676 – 6 June 1740), who became a noted Lieutenant-Governor of Virginia.

== Military career ==
By 1680, Roger was an ensign in the Tangier Regiment of Foot, and was wounded on 27 October fighting the local Moors. In 1681, he was suspended by Colonel Percy Kirke for duelling with Ensign Bartholomew Pitts, later being cashiered for this offence. He was sent back to England in 1682 with a letter begging for his readmission into His Majesty's Service, and he was reinstated as an ensign in his old Company on 8 March 1683. In 1684 he returned to England. In 1685, the Tangier Regiment was renamed the Queen Dowager's Regiment of Foot, and he probably fought against the Monmouth Rebellion.

In 1687, he became a first lieutenant in the Earl of Bath's Regiment – created by Sir John Granville, 1st Earl of Bath (1628–1701). He was promoted to captain on 1 May 1690. He fought and was wounded at the Battle of Steenkerque on 3 August 1692. On 21 December of that year, he was promoted to major in the same regiment, and, on 1 January 1696, promoted to lieutenant-colonel of Sir Bevil Granville's Regiment of Foot. In 1702, on campaign with the Duke of Marlborough, he was shot through the body at the defence of Tongeren in Belgium. He reputedly took on the entire French Army with only two regiments, before surrendering.

On 5 March 1704, he raised his own regiment – Colonel Elliott's Regiment of Foot. Officers were commissioned on 10 April that year at St James'. On 2 July 1704, again on campaign with the Duke of Marlborough, he fought and was wounded at the Battle of Schellenberg. It is possible that he fought at the Battle of Blenheim on 13 August 1704. However, he certainly did not lead the cavalry at this battle, as has been maintained by other biographies – this was led by General Sir John 'Salamander' Cutts.

== Gibraltar ==
In March 1705, Colonel Elliott's Regiment of Foot embarked for Spain and served at Gibraltar, which was declared a free port in 1706. On 1 January 1707, he was promoted to brigadier-general, and later that year to Lieutenant-governor of Gibraltar. On 24 December, he was appointed Governor of Gibraltar. His time in office is remembered in the Gibraltar records as one of mercenary opportunity; whereas, in the London records, it appears that he proceeded with expensive but vital defensive fortification with only minimal prior financial approval. The arguments over the accounts for these defences subsequently caused problems for the probate of his personal estate. On 1 January 1710, he was promoted to major-general, and on 24 January 1711, he handed over the governorship to Brigadier-general Thomas Stanwix. He finally departed Gibraltar on 18 June 1711.

== Return to England ==
Elliott returned to England and leased Byfeld House in Church Road, Barnes, Surrey. He married, and had a small family. However, he never fully recovered from his wounds, and died on 16 May 1714. He was 48 or 49.

== Family ==
On 4 March 1712 at St Peter upon Cornhill, London, Roger married Charlotte Elliot (c.1692 – c.1753), the daughter of William 'the Laceman' Elliot (c.1690 – 1728) of Brugh and Wells, a rich London merchant, and his wife Eleanor Tankard (1664–1745). They had two children:

1. Granville Elliott (7 October 1713 – 10 October 1759), 1st Count Elliott, who married firstly Jeanne Thérèse du Han (1707–48) and secondly Elizabeth Duckett (1724–1804).
2. Catherine (Kitty) Elliott (18 September 1714 – 15 January 1757), who married firstly c. 7 or 9 August 1736 Westminster to Charles Boyle (of Araglin Bridge, co Cork, related to the Earls of Cork and Orrery), and secondly, in 1742, to the Very Rev Robert Bligh (c. 1704 – 1778), the Dean of Elphin and a younger brother of John Bligh, 1st Earl of Darnley (1687–1728)

Mary Elliott, who married Garrett Fitzmaurice, of Duagh, Ireland, claimed to be a natural daughter of Roger Elliott.

Roger Elliott never fully recovered from his various wounds and died at Byfeld House on 16 May 1714. He was buried 21 May in the cemetery of St Mary the Virgin, Barnes.

His will was probated on 16 November 1714 but his estate took longer to resolve because of the difficulties previously mentioned. The eventual resolution was mostly due to the involvement of his father-in-law, William 'the Laceman' Elliot, who sought to expedite his daughter's remarriage to Captain Thomas Burroughs.

His widow remarried on 15 July 1715 at St James, Westminster to Captain Thomas Burroughs (died before 1728). She died before 1753.

Military offices
Preceded by Unknown	1st lieutenant, captain, major of Earl of Bath's Regiment; 1687–1696	Succeeded by Unknown
Preceded by Unknown	Lt-Col of Sir Bevil Granville's Regiment of Foot; 1696–1704	Succeeded by Unknown
New regiment	Colonel of Colonel Elliott's Regiment of Foot; 1704–1707	Regiment subsumed
Preceded by Unknown	Brigadier-General; 1707–1710	Succeeded by Unknown
Preceded by John Shrimpton	Governor of Gibraltar; 1707–1711	Succeeded by Thomas Stanwix
Preceded by Unknown	Major-General; 1710–1711	Succeeded by Unknown
