= William Hewett (disambiguation) =

William Hewett may refer to:

- Sir William Hewett (Lord Mayor) (c.1505–1567), Lord Mayor of London
- William Hewett (British Army officer) (1795-1891), soldier
- William Hewett (died 1840), Royal Navy officer and surveyor of the North Sea
- Sir William Hewett (1834–1888), Royal Navy officer and recipient of the Victoria Cross

== See also ==
- William Hewitt (disambiguation)
- William Hewlett (disambiguation)
