= Eliot family =

Eliot family may refer to:

- Eliot family (America)
- Eliot family (South England)
  - Earl of St Germans, subsidiary title Baron Eliot

== See also ==
- Elliot, including the name Eliot and a list of people with the name
