= Count Elliott =

Hereditary title in the Holy Roman Empire

- Creation date: 7 March 1735
- Created by: Emperor Charles VI
- First holder: Granville Elliott
- Last holder: Francis Perceval Eliot
- Extinction date: 23 August 1818
- Motto: Fac Aut Tace (do or be silent)

Count Elliott (also spelled Count Eliot) was a hereditary title in the Holy Roman Empire held by the Eliot military family. The title encompassed Count of the Holy Roman Empire, Comte de Morhange, and Graf von Port Eliot.

== History ==
In 1735 Granville Elliott was set to marry Jeanne Thérèse du Han, Comtesse de Martigny and lady of honour to the Empress of Germany. Prior to their wedding Emperor Charles VI created him Comte de Morhange and he was made a Chamberlain to the Emperor. Over time he eventually became a Count of the Holy Roman Empire.

Granville spent a significant amount of time in London attempting to prove that his direct ancestors, Richard Eliot and Catherine Killigrew, had married prior to the birth of their son George Elliott. If this were true, it would make Granville the rightful legitimate heir to Sir John Eliot and thus Port Eliot, the ancestral home of the Eliot Family and seat of the Earl of St Germans. Despite his attempt failing in London, Granville was given the title Graf von Port Eliot at the Court of Lorraine. Upon his death in 1759, the titles were passed to his oldest living son Amable Gaspard Antoine Elliott.

In 1808, after the fall of the Holy Roman Empire, the title Count of the Empire was transferred to the German Empire. Without an heir, Amable Gaspard Antoine Elliott chose his half brother Francis Perceval Eliot to succeed him. Francis thought being in French and German nobility would be improper and died in 1818 without assuming the titles, which then fell into abeyance.

== List of Counts ==
- 1735-59: Granville Elliott (1713-1759), 1st Count Elliott
- 1759-14: Amable Gaspard Antoine Elliott (1738-1814), 2nd Count Elliott
- 1814-18: Francis Perceval Eliot (1755-1818), heir to title but never assumed
