= Hewett baronets of Nether Seale (1813) =

Escutcheon of the Hewett baronets of Nether Seale

The Hewett Baronetcy, of Nether Seale in the County of Leicester, was created in the Baronetage of the United Kingdom on 6 November 1813 for General George Hewett, Commander-in-Chief of the Forces in India in 1807. The 2nd baronet was a colonel in the army and served in the Peninsular War.

== Hewett baronets, of Nether Seale (1813) ==
- Sir George Hewett, 1st Baronet (1750–1840)
- Sir George Henry Hewett, 2nd Baronet (1791–1862)
- Sir George John Routledge Hewett, 3rd Baronet (1818–1876)
- Sir Harald George Hewett, 4th Baronet (1858–1949)
- Sir John George Hewett, MC, 5th Baronet (1895–1990)
- Sir Peter John Smithson Hewett, 6th Baronet (1931–2001)
- Sir Richard Mark John Hewett, 7th Baronet (born 1958)

The heir presumptive to the baronetcy is David Patrick John Hewett (born 1968), 2nd and youngest son of the 6th Baronet. His heir apparent is his eldest son Hector Alexander Hewett (born 1999).

== Notes ==
Baronetage of the United Kingdom
Preceded by Rowley baronets	Hewett baronets of Nether Seale; 6 November 1813	Succeeded by Duff-Gordon baronets
