= St Germans Priory =

Church in , Cornwall

St Germans Church
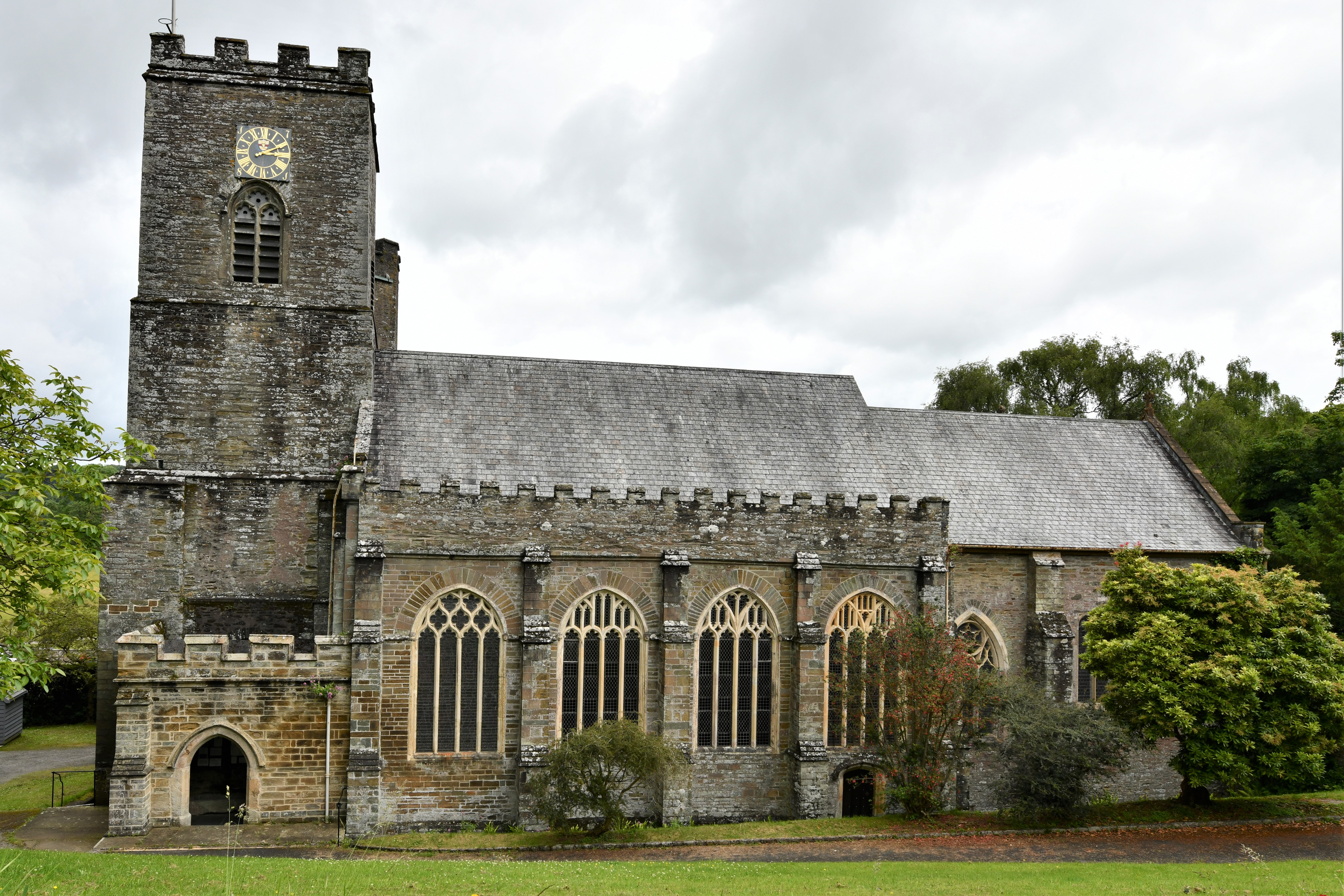
- St Germans Church
- St Germans Church
- 50.397°N 4.309°W
- Location: St Germans, Cornwall
- Country: England
- Denomination: Church of England

Administration
- Diocese: Truro
- Archdeaconry: Bodmin
- Deanery: East Wivelshire

St Germans Priory is a former Augustinian priory church in the village of St Germans, Cornwall, England. Originating as the seat of the Saxon bishops of Cornwall, the present building is largely Norman, with significant extensions in the 14th and 15th centuries and later restoration in the Victorian period. Following the Dissolution of the Monasteries, the priory became associated with the Eliot family, and the church now serves as the parish church of St Germans while remaining part of the historic Port Eliot estate complex.

== History ==
According to local tradition, a church at St Germans was founded by St Germanus in the 5th century. The earliest documentary evidence, however, relates to the 10th century, when King Athelstan established an episcopal seat here and appointed Conan as bishop of Cornwall, indicating that an important religious community already existed at the site.

Royal charters confirmed the monastery’s possession of lands at Landrake and Landulph in 1018, grants originally made by King Edmund; these holdings remained with the community until the Dissolution. In 1042 the Cornish see was transferred to Crediton, and the monastic lands were divided between the monastery and the bishop.

Following the Norman Conquest, a college of secular canons was established and later reorganised, during the episcopate of Bishop Bartholomew of Exeter (1161–1184), as an Augustinian priory. The priory church was rebuilt on a substantial scale and served for a time as the cathedral church of Cornwall. The parish church dates to the 12th century and was consecrated in 1261. A south chapel was added in the late 14th century, and the building was further extended during the 15th century.

The church had earlier served as the seat of the Saxon bishops of Cornwall. In 1358, relics of St Germanus were brought to the church and enshrined in the east end of the south aisle, which at that time functioned as the parish church. Following the Dissolution, the priory chancel fell into disuse and collapsed in 1592, after which a large Perpendicular east window was inserted in the remaining structure.

The nearby holy well at Dupath Well is traditionally associated with the monks of St Germans and is thought to date from the early 16th century. At the Dissolution of the Monasteries in the 16th century the priory was suppressed and its buildings were converted into a private residence for the Eliot family, who have remained associated with the site and whose members are commemorated in the church. Later renovations included rebuilding of the north aisle in 1888 along with other Victorian modifications.

Today the former priory church functions as the parish church of St Germanus, while the historic complex is managed by the Church of England in partnership with the St Germans Priory Trust.

== Architecture ==
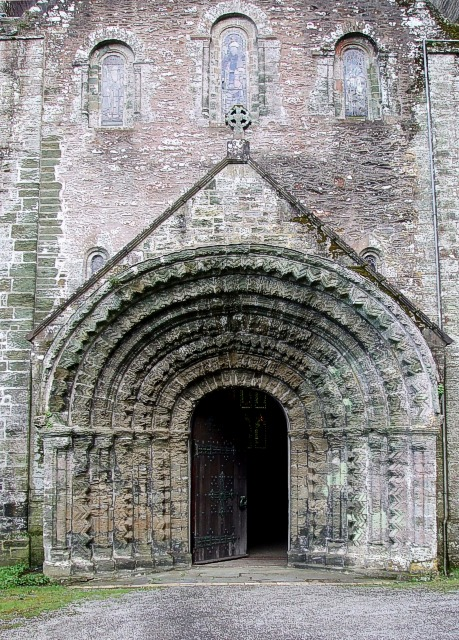
Norman west door

=== Structure and fabric ===
The church is constructed of slatestone rubble with greenstone and sandstone dressings and slate roofs. The simple plan comprises a combined nave and chancel with a south aisle, north transept, and vestry, together with two west towers and a south-west porch between them. Both towers have three stages with embattled parapets. The south-west tower is square and dates to the 15th century, while the 13th century north-west tower rises to an octagonal upper stage.

The south aisle, of four bays, has weathered buttresses and four-light Perpendicular windows beneath four-centred arches. The chancel east window has five lights with Perpendicular tracery and a transom, and other openings include Norman and later medieval doorways with hood-moulded arches and carved detail.

The Norman west front is a major Norman survival in Cornwall, with a west doorway of seven orders enriched with zigzag ornament beneath a broad gable. The present interior represents the nave of the former priory church, the chancel having been lost after the Dissolution.

The church has a peal of eight bells.

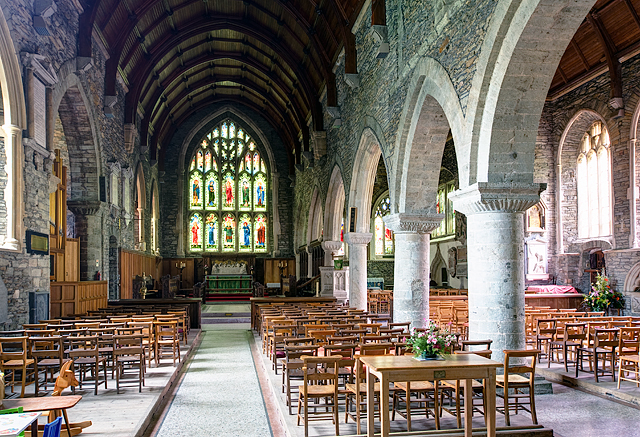
Church interior

=== Fitting, monuments and glass ===
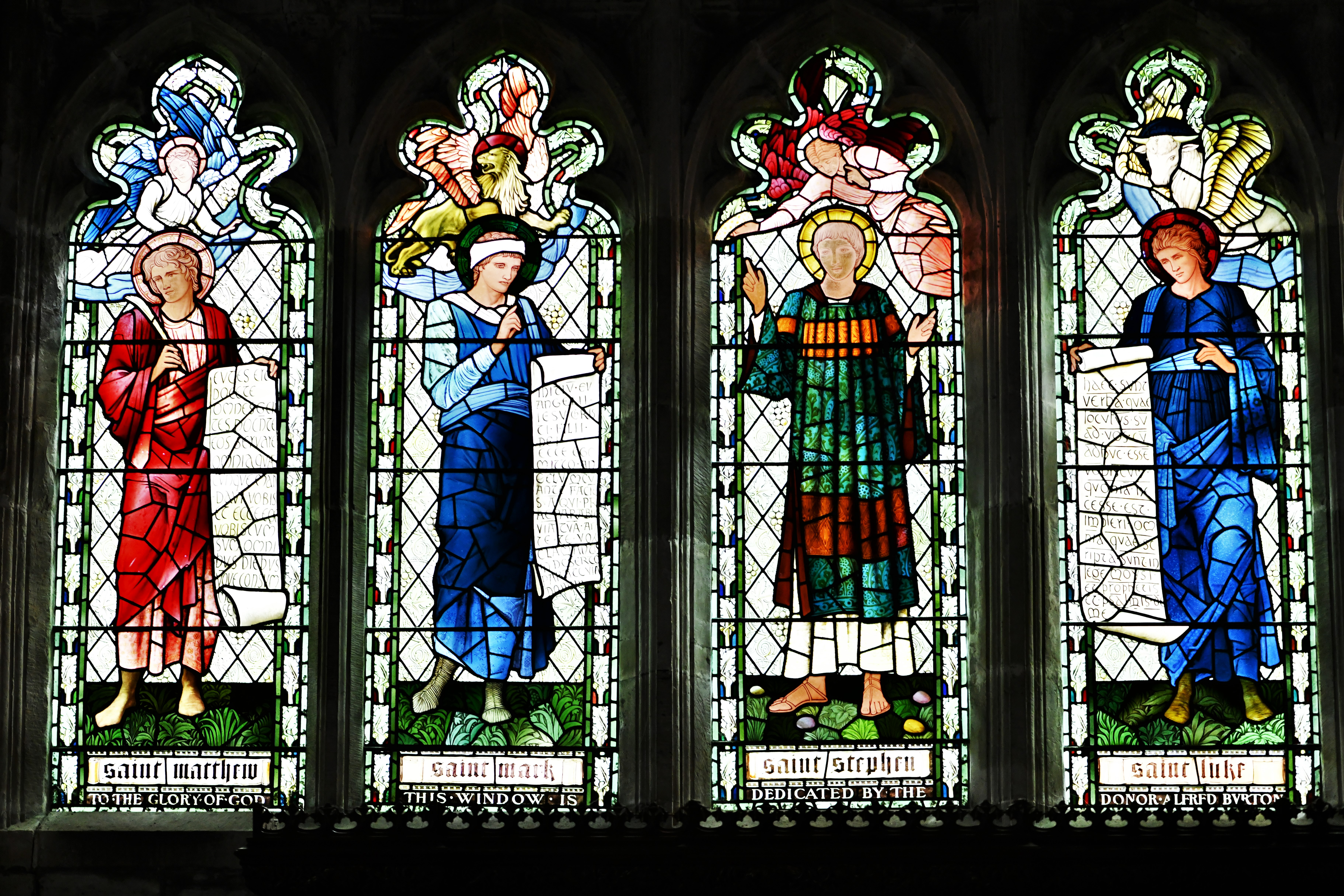
East window, Edward Burne-Jones

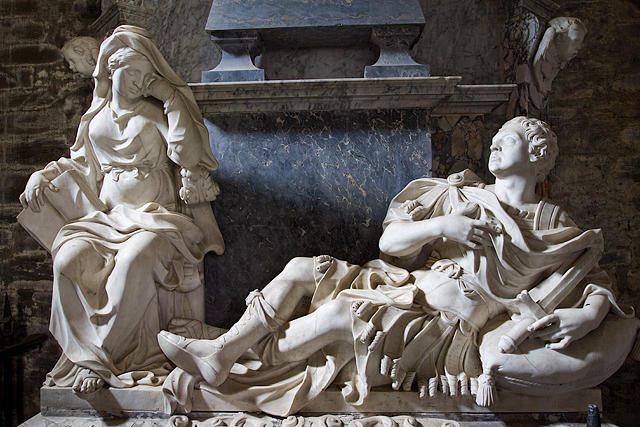
Monument to Edward Elliot

Notable fittings include the font, a misericord, and heraldic displays such as the Royal Arms of 1660 and the Eliot arms. The church contains several monuments dating from the 17th to 19th centuries, including works by Rysbrack and Westmacott, commemorating members of the Eliot family, the Earls of St Germans, and other local figures. Medieval liturgical fittings include a piscina, sedilia, and tomb recesses with ogee hoods, together with a holy-water stoup near the west door. Arches supported on clustered columns connect the nave with both west towers.

The chancel east window contains stained glass of 1896 by Morris and Co. to designs by Edward Burne-Jones, depicting Christ and attendant figures above St Stephen and the Four Evangelists. Burne-Jones also designed the south-wall windows of 1902, representing the Virtues.

Memorials in the south aisle and elsewhere commemorate the Eliot family, who acquired the former priory after the Dissolution. Among the most notable is the monument to Edward Eliot (1682–1722) in the north-west part of the church, an early English work in black and white marble by the Flemish sculptor John Michael Rysbrack, commissioned in 1723. Eliot served as Tory Member of Parliament for the rotten borough of St Germans between 1705 and 1710.

The church also contains a mortuary chapel of the Moyle family of Bake.

== Gallery ==
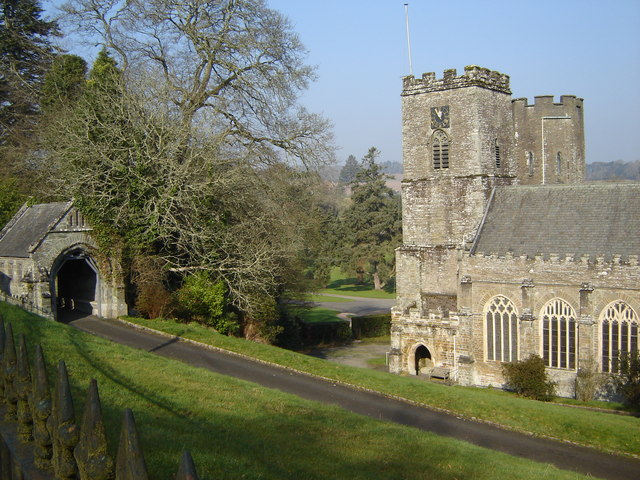
St German Church and arched entrance

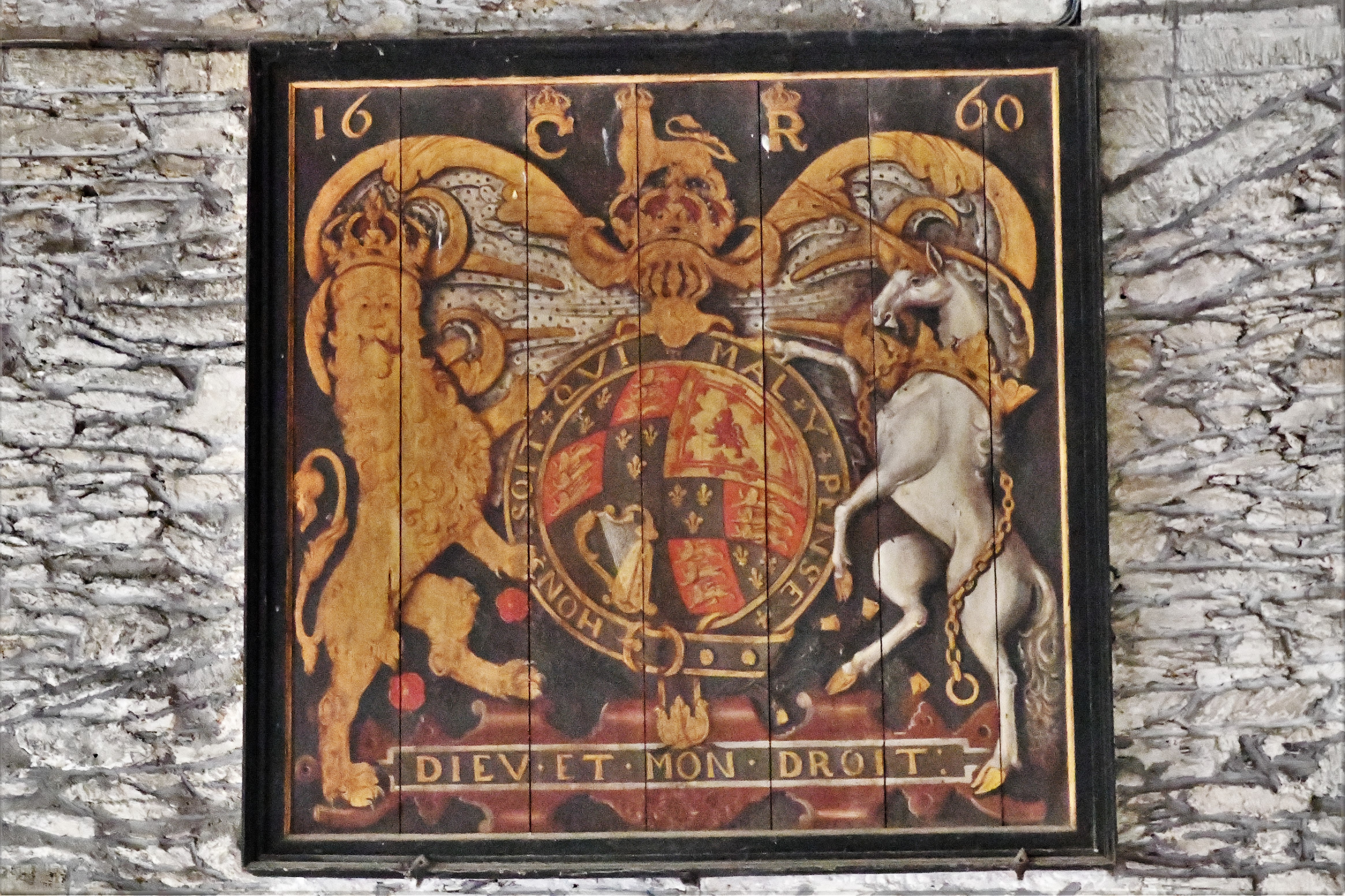
Royal Coat of Arms, Charles II

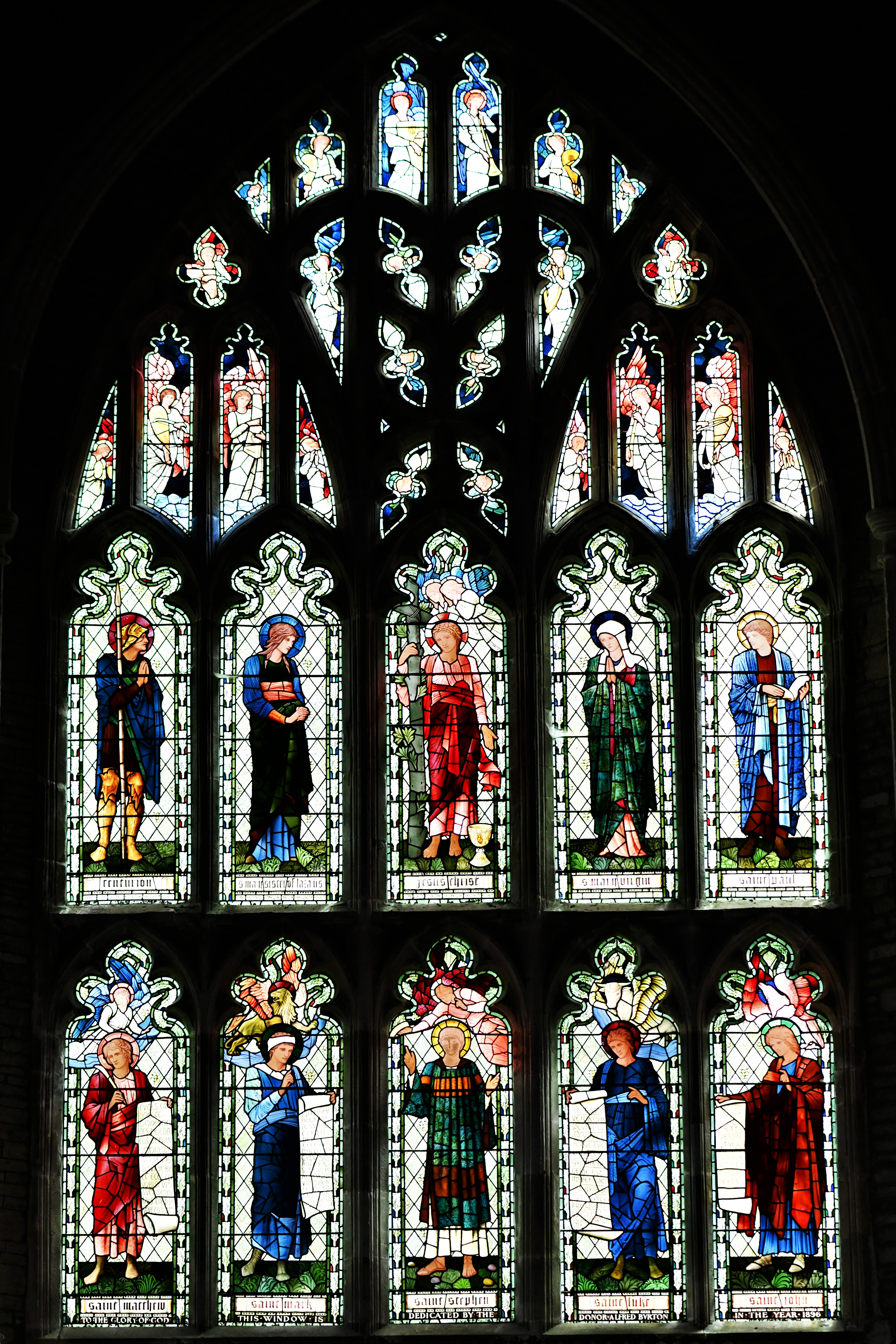
Edward Burne-Jones window

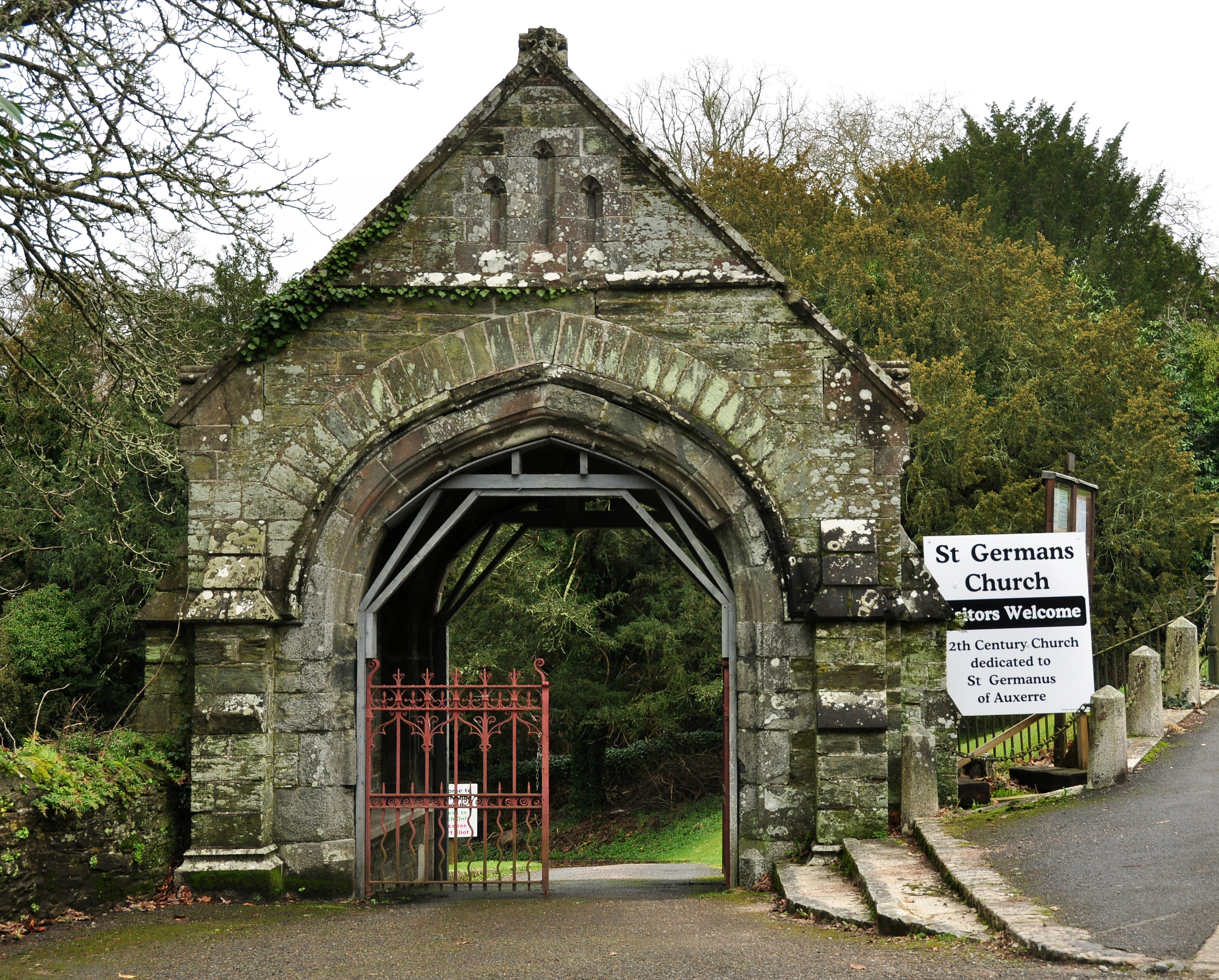
lychgate

== Other burials ==
- John Eliot, 1st Earl of St Germans
- Henry Eliot, 5th Earl of St Germans
- John Eliot (died 1685)
- Edward James Eliot
- John Eliot, 1st Earl of St Germans
- Edward Craggs-Eliot, 1st Baron Eliot

== See also ==
- Bishop of St Germans
- List of cathedrals in the United Kingdom
- List of English abbeys, priories and friaries serving as parish churches
