= Bill Hewitt =

Bill Hewitt may refer to:

- Bill Hewitt (American football) (1909–1947), American football player in the National Football League
- Bill Hewitt (basketball) (1944–2026), American retired professional basketball player
- Bill Hewitt (politician) (1930–2016), Australian politician
- Bill Hewitt (sportscaster) (1928–1996), Canadian broadcaster
- C. R. Hewitt (1901–1994), known as Bill, British journalist
- W. A. Hewitt (William Abraham "Billy" Hewitt; 1875–1966), Canadian sports executive and journalist

== See also ==
- William Hewitt (disambiguation)
