= Benjamin Valentine =

English parliamentarian (1584–1652)

Benjamin Valentine (prob. bapt. 9 March 1584 – June 1652), was an English politician and Member of Parliament.

Of obscure origins, he attached himself to various influential politicians and favourites and rose to prominence with the support of William Herbert, 3rd Earl of Pembroke and Sir John Eliot. With Eliot he opposed the religious and fiscal innovation taking place in the early period of King Charles I's reign, and attacked one of his favourites, George Villiers, 1st Duke of Buckingham. He became embroiled in controversy as he was one of the members to hold Speaker John Finch in his chair to prevent him adjourning parliament and preventing Eliot from denouncing such measures as tonnage and poundage. For this Valentine and his associates were arrested and tried.

The trial revealed the clash between the rights and prerogatives of parliament versus the king, and became a political storm. Valentine refused to admit guilt or comply with orders, and was eventually fined and imprisoned for a number of years. Released prior to the resumption of parliament after eleven years of Personal Rule, Valentine returned to sit as a member, but took little part in the English Civil War.

== Origins ==
Valentine's early origins are obscure but records of the baptism of a Benjamin Valentine at St Giles-without-Cripplegate on 9 March 1584 probably refer to the future parliamentarian. His family may have originated in Suffolk, and his father was perhaps a member of the Inner Temple in the early 1570s.^{[a]} Valentine can first be traced with surety in historical records in relation to some business transactions with his future father-in-law, Matthias Springham, in July 1610. He married Springham's daughter, Elizabeth, on 11 November 1610.

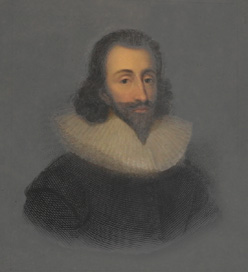
Sir John Eliot, Valentine's political patron, who arranged his entry into Parliament

Valentine established connections with several powerful figures at court, including by 1613 Robert Carr, 1st Earl of Somerset, a favourite of James I. Somerset's fall from favour in 1615 reduced Valentine's influence, and he was briefly imprisoned for debt in 1619. Valentine then attached himself to the retinue of William Herbert, 3rd Earl of Pembroke and sought to undermine the royal favourite George Villiers, 1st Duke of Buckingham, with limited success. He became intimate with Sir John Eliot through his opposition to Buckingham, and Eliot arranged for him to be elected on 3 March 1628 to represent the borough of St. Germans in the Parliament of 1628–9. He used his place in parliament to mount further attacks on Buckingham, and as one biographer has stated, he was "clearly moving in circles hostile to both arbitrary government and High Church innovations".

== Confrontation and arrest ==
He was in the House of Commons on 2 March 1629 when the Speaker, John Finch, would have obeyed King Charles I's direction for adjournment. Valentine, with Denzil Holles, held the Speaker down in his seat while Sir John Eliot read out resolutions questioning the king's proceedings respecting religion and taxation, particularly regarding tonnage and poundage. On 5 March, with John Selden and William Coryton, he was under examination at the Privy Council, and was committed to the Tower of London.

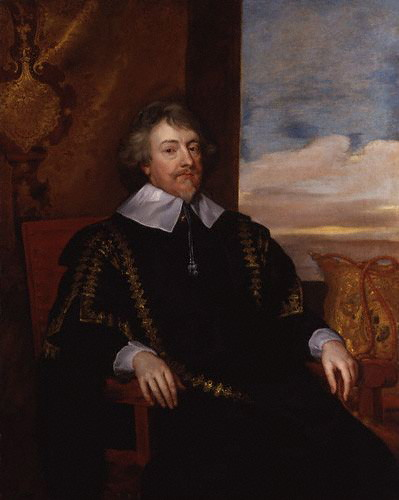
John Finch, portrait by Sir Anthony van Dyck. Valentine held Finch in his chair during the 1629 session of Parliament, precipitating a political storm and his own arrest.

On 17 March he was examined before a committee of the council, when he refused to answer any questions respecting acts done in Parliament. On 6 May he, with Selden, Holles, William Strode, Miles Hobart, and Walter Long, considering themselves legally entitled to bail, applied to the Court of King's Bench for a writ of habeas corpus. Such stringent conditions were, however, imposed that Valentine absolutely declined to comply with them, and refused to accept bail (3 October 1629). On 7 May an information was filed against him and others in the Star Chamber by the Attorney-General Robert Heath, but the prisoners were proceeded against in the Court of King's Bench. Valentine's 'plea and demurrer' to the information of the Attorney-General, prepared by his counsel, Robert Mason and Henry Calthorpe, was issued on 22 May, and was followed by a further plea on 1 June in answer to the altered information of 29 May.

With Selden he should have appeared before the judges of the King's Bench on 24 June, had not the king reversed the order for fear that bail should be granted. On 13 October Heath brought in his information against Eliot, Holles, and Valentine in the Court of King's Bench. On 29 October the three prisoners were transferred from the Tower to the Marshalsea Prison. They appeared in court on 26 January 1630, and again the following day, when Valentine's case was pleaded by Calthorpe. Judgement was pronounced on 12 February, when Valentine was fined £500.

== Confinement ==
During the summer of 1630 Valentine, with Selden and Strode, was removed to the Gatehouse Prison on account of the sickness in the town. Through the leniency of their keeper they were frequently released on short paroles. They visited Eliot in the Tower, and passed whole weeks in the country in their own houses or in those of their friends. Returning to the Gatehouse towards the end of September, they were put into closer confinement, and their keeper fined £100 and committed to the Marshalsea. Valentine continued a prisoner for eleven years, and was finally released in January 1640 to placate public opinion prior to the assembling of the Short Parliament. He was elected to represent St. Germans in the Long Parliament and took the Protestation on 5 May 1641, and the Covenant on 25 September 1643. He took little part in the ensuing civil war, though he supported the negotiations surrounding the Treaty of Newport in 1649.

== Later life ==
Parliament granted him £5,000 in 1647 in compensation for his losses, but Valentine only received half of the sum. He died in June 1652 and was buried at St Margaret's, Westminster on 9 June. Elizabeth, his wife, had been buried on 18 September 1616. The couple were survived by one son, Matthias, who died in the winter of 1654, and is described in his will as of St. Clement Danes, Middlesex. As one biographer has recorded, Valentine "does not appear to have been ultimately a committed revolutionary ... his place in history rests upon his actions, however factious or ideological, in dissenting from the Caroline regime of the late 1620s."

== Notes ==
a. The Oxford Dictionary of National Biography suggests that Valentine may also have been a native of Cheshire.

== Citations ==
Parliament of England
Preceded by Sir John Eliot; Sir Henry Marten	Member of Parliament for St Germans; 1628–1629; With: Thomas Cotton	Parliament suspended until 1640
Preceded by William Scawen; John Eliot	Member of Parliament for St Germans; 1640–1652; With: John Moyle 1640–1648	Not represented in the Barebones Parliament
