= William Hewitt =

William Hewitt may refer to:

- W. A. Hewitt (1875–1966), Canadian sports executive and journalist
- William Alexander Hewitt, former executive at John Deere
- William Hewitt (minister) (born 1951), Moderator of the General Assembly of the Church of Scotland
- William Henry Hewitt, South African recipient of the Victoria Cross
- William Hewitt (cricketer) (1795–1870), English cricketer
- William Wells Hewitt (1898–1966), English organist and composer

== See also ==
- Bill Hewitt (disambiguation)
- William Hewett (disambiguation)
- William Hewlett
