= Sir George Hewett, 1st Baronet =

General The Right Honourable Sir George Hewett GCB Bt
- Born: 11 June 1750; Leicestershire
- Died: 21 March 1840 (aged 89); Freemantle Park, Leicestershire
- Alma mater: Wimborne Grammar School
- Children: 11, including William
- Military career
- Allegiance: United Kingdom
- Branch: British Army
- Service years: 1762–1840
- Rank: General
- Unit: 43rd Regiment of Foot
- Commands: Adjutant General in Ireland; Inspector General of Army of Reserve; Barrackmaster General; Commander-in-Chief, India; Commander-in-Chief, Ireland
- Conflicts: American Revolutionary War; French Revolutionary Wars; Napoleonic Wars

General Sir George Hewett, 1st Baronet, GCB, PC (Ire) (11 June 1750 – 21 March 1840) was a British Army officer who was Commander-in-Chief, India and then Commander-in-Chief, Ireland.

== Military career ==
Educated at Wimborne Grammar School and the Royal Military Academy, Woolwich, Hewett was commissioned into the 70th Regiment of Foot in 1762. In 1771, he went to New York to help control the Carib Uprising and in 1780 he took part in the Siege of Charlestown.

In 1787, he was appointed commanding officer of the 43rd Regiment of Foot and in 1791, he went to Ireland where he became adjutant-general (serving there until 1799). He raised a new regiment which was designated the 92nd Regiment of Foot.

He returned to England, where he served as inspector general of recruiting for the British Army from 1798 to 1804. He was given the colonelcy of the 61st (South Gloucestershire) Regiment of Foot for life in 1800 and became barrackmaster-general in 1804. In 1807, he became Commander-in-Chief, India and in 1809 he briefly took over the Government of India while the Governor-General put down a mutiny. His last appointment was as Commander-in-Chief, Ireland in 1813.

He was created a baronet, of Nether Seale in the County of Leicester, on 6 November 1813.

He lived at Freemantle Park near Southampton.

== Family ==
In 1785, he married Julia Johnson, and together they went on to have five sons and six daughters, including Col. Sir George Henry Hewett, 2nd Baronet and Lieutenant-colonel William Hewett.

Military offices
Preceded by Earl of Hopetoun	Commander-in-Chief, Ireland; 1813–1816	Succeeded by Sir George Beckwith
Preceded by Viscount Lake	Commander-in-Chief, India; 1807	Succeeded by Forbes Champagné
Preceded by Staats Long Morris	Colonel of the 61st Regiment of Foot; 1800–1840	Succeeded by John Gardiner
Baronetage of the United Kingdom
New creation	Baronet (of Nether Seale); 1813–1840	Succeeded by George Henry Hewett
