= 28th (North Gloucestershire) Regiment of Foot =

- Active: 1694 – 1 July 1881
- Allegiance: England (1694–1707); Great Britain (1707–1800); Province of Quebec (1763–1791); United Kingdom (1801–1881)
- Branch: English Army (1694–1707); British Army (1707–1881)
- Type: Line infantry
- Size: One battalion
- Garrison/HQ: Horfield Barracks, Bristol
- Nicknames: The Old Braggs; The Slashers; The Silver Tailed Dandies
- Engagements: War of the Spanish Succession; War of the Quadruple Alliance; War of the Austrian Succession; French Revolutionary Wars; Napoleonic Wars; Crimean War

The 28th (North Gloucestershire) Regiment of Foot was a line infantry regiment of the British Army, raised in 1694. Under the Childers Reforms it amalgamated with the 61st (South Gloucestershire) Regiment of Foot to form the Gloucestershire Regiment in 1881.

== History ==
=== Early years ===
A regimental private in 1694

The regiment was first raised by Colonel Sir John Gibson, who had served as the Lieutenant-Governor of Portsmouth, as Sir John Gibson's Regiment of Foot on 16 February 1694. It was posted to Newfoundland to protect the colony there, losing many of its men to the extreme cold. The regiment was disbanded in 1697, but reformed under the same colonel in 1702. Posted to the continent during the War of the Spanish Succession the regiment fought at the Battle of Elixheim in July 1705 and at Battle of Ramillies in May 1706. It was then sent to the Spain, losing over half its men at the Battle of Almansa in April 1707, and then took part in the capture of Vigo in October 1719 during the War of the Quadruple Alliance.

A regimental private in c. 1742

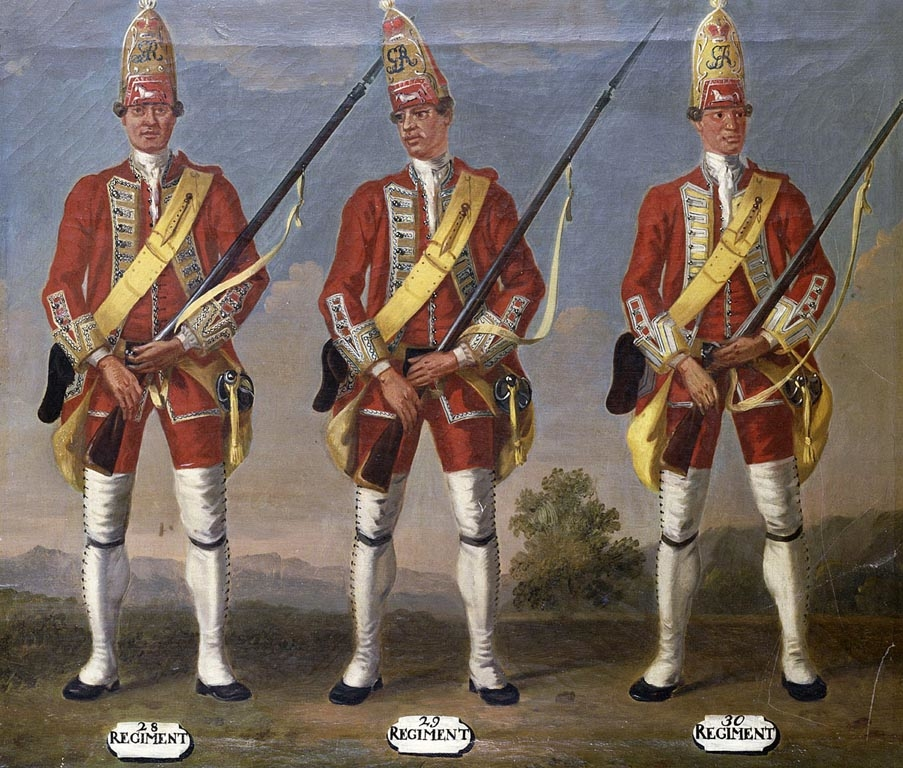
c. 1751 portrait of a regimental grenadier (left)

The regiment saw action in Flanders during the War of the Austrian Succession and, having been designated the 28th Regiment of Foot in 1751, it took part in the Battle of Louisburg in June 1758 and the Battle of the Plains of Abraham at Quebec in September 1759 during the Seven Years' War. After the conclusion of the Seven Year's war, it was deployed in Quebec, Canada along with the 52nd Regiment of Foot.

The regiment was sent back in North America in May 1776 and took part in the Battle of White Plains in October 1776 during the American War of Independence. It also fought in the West Indies and helped take Saint Lucia in 1778, but was captured by the French on Saint Kitts in 1782 and interned until the end of the war. In 1782, renamed the 28th (North Gloucestershire) Regiment of Foot as part of the reforms to create a territorial association for each regiment, it returned to Flanders following the outbreak of war with revolutionary France in 1793 and moved to the West Indies in 1795. A detachment remained in Gibraltar before being moved to Menorca in 1798.

=== Napoleonic Wars ===
In March 1801 the regiment formed part of the British expeditionary force that landed at Aboukir Bay in Egypt to oppose Napoleon's Army of the East. On 21 March, during the Battle of Alexandria, French cavalry broke through the British lines, formed up behind the regiment, and began to charge. Still heavily engaged to their front, the order was given "Rear Rank, 28th! Right About Face", and standing thus in two ranks, back to back, the regiment successfully defended itself. After the battle, the regiment began wearing a badge on the back as well as the front of the headdress to commemorate their action, a unique distinction in the British Army which was officially sanctioned in 1830. (Note: The origins of the back badge and its initial form are not known; other than the honour "Egypt", awarded to all units, there is no record of a special badge being officially granted. An officer who served with the regiment between 1805 and 1807 wrote that the regiment "acquired the emblem of the double front." In 1815, a staff officer witnessed the regiment marching out to Quatre Bras "having their number both in front and rear of their low caps—a memorial of Egypt." The first record of official recognition appears in an 1830 letter from the Horse Guards, which states that "it was never the intention to deprive the 28th Regiment of any badge of honour they may have acquired by their distinguished service in Egypt, and that there will be no objection to their retaining the plate they have been accustomed to wear on the back of their caps since that service..." This was officially confirmed in another letter dated 1843. It is possible, therefore, that the back badge was introduced by the regiment shortly after the Battle of Alexandria, but not officially sanctioned until 1830.)

The regiment was dispatched to Denmark and took part in the Battle of Copenhagen in August 1807 during the Gunboat War. The regiment next landed in Portugal in July 1808 for service in the Peninsular War. It took part in the Battle of Corunna on 16 January 1809 before being evacuated from the Peninsula the following day. A detachment remained behind and fought at the Battle of Talavera in July 1809. The remainder of the regiment went on to take part in the disastrous Walcheren Campaign in summer 1809.

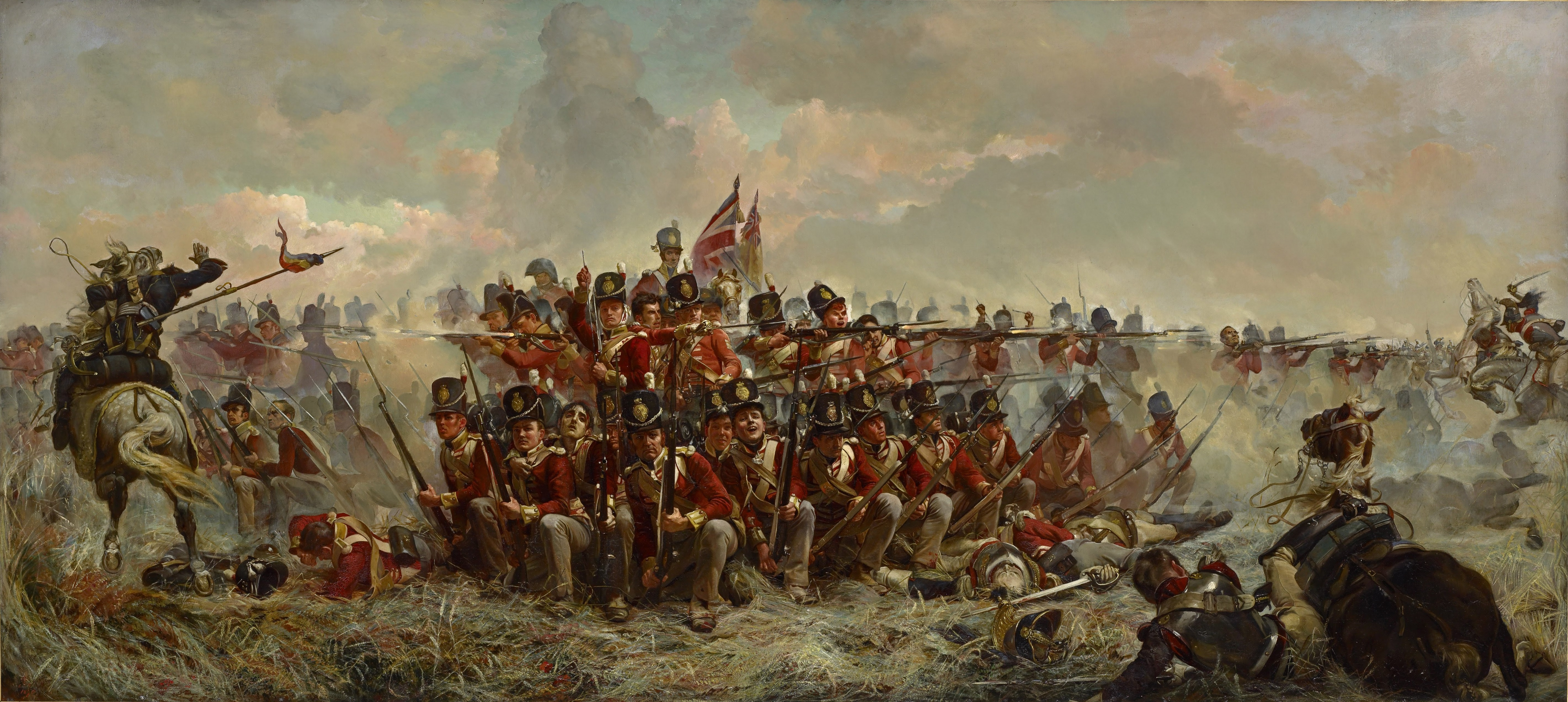
1875 painting of the regiment at the Battle of Quatre Bras

The regiment returned to the Peninsula in January 1810. It saw action at the Battle of Barrosa in March 1811, the Battle of Albuera in May 1811 and the Battle of Arroyo dos Molinos in October 1811, as well as the Battle of Vitoria in June 1813 and the Battle of the Pyrenees in July 1813. It then pursued the French Army into France and fought at the Battle of Nivelle in November 1813, the Battle of the Nive in December 1813, the Battle of Orthez in February 1814 and the Battle of Toulouse in April 1814. It was one of the many Peninsula veteran regiments which was available for the Hundred Days campaign and fought at the Battle of Quatre Bras and at the Battle of Waterloo, as part of the 8th Brigade commanded by James Kempt, in June 1815. Because of its actions in this campaign, the regiment earned distinguished mention in the dispatches of the Duke of Wellington.

=== The Victorian era ===
After the war the regiment spent the next 20 years in the Mediterranean, Ireland and England, before being posted to Australia as garrison troops. It served in India from 1842 to 1848 and fought at the Battle of Alma in September 1854, the Battle of Inkerman in November 1854 and the Siege of Sevastopol in winter 1854 during the Crimean War. It then served in India from 1858 to 1865, before spending further time in the Mediterranean. As part of the Cardwell Reforms of the 1870s, where single-battalion regiments were linked together to share a single depot and recruiting district in the United Kingdom, the 28th was linked with the 61st (South Gloucestershire) Regiment of Foot, and assigned to district no. 37 at Horfield Barracks in Bristol. The final postings were to Hong Kong, Singapore, Malacca and Penang. On 1 July 1881 the Childers Reforms came into effect and the regiment amalgamated with the 61st (South Gloucestershire) Regiment of Foot to form the Gloucestershire Regiment.

Archive material of the 28th Regiment of Foot is held by The Soldiers of Gloucestershire Museum in the Historic Docks Gloucester.

== Battle honours ==
The battle honours of the regiment were:

- Egypt campaign: No individual battle honours were awarded immediately after the campaign, instead the Sphinx badge superscribed "Egypt" (8 March –26 August 1801) was awarded in 1802. Mandora, awarded 1813–1817. The battles of the campaign which the 28th were involved in were: Aboukir, Roman Camp, Alexandria (21 March), Cairo, Alexandria (17 August – 2 September 1801)
- Peninsular War: Corunna, Talavera, Barrosa, Albuhera, Vitoria, Pyrenees, Nivelle, Nive, Orthes, Toulouse, Peninsula
- Napoleonic Wars: Quatre Bras, Waterloo
- Crimean War: Alma, Inkerman, Sevastopol
- Ramillies, Louisburg, Quebec 1759 (all presented to successor regiment in 1882)
- Guadaloupe 1759, Martinique 1762, Havannah, St Lucia 1778 (all presented to successor regiment in 1909)

== Regimental Colonels ==
Colonels of the Regiment were:

- 1694–1697: Col. Sir John Gibson
- disbanded 1697
- reformed 1702
- 1702–1704: Col. Sir John Gibson
- 1704–1706: Maj-Gen. Sampson de Lalo
- 1706–1709: Brig-Gen. John Mordaunt, Viscount Mordaunt
- 1709–1715: Brig-Gen. Andrews Windsor
- 1715–1730: Lt-Gen. William Barrell
- 1730–1734: Maj-Gen. Nicholas Price
- 1734–1759: Lt-Gen. Philip Bragg

28th Regiment of Foot - (1751)

- 1759–1773: F.M. George Townshend, 1st Marquess Townshend
- 1773–1777: Maj-Gen. Thomas Erle
- 1777–1787: Gen. Sir Charles Grey, 1st Earl Grey, KB

28th (the North Gloucestershire) Regiment of Foot - (1782)

- 1787–1789: Maj-Gen. James Paterson
- 1789–1815: Gen. Robert Prescott
- 1815–1849: Gen. Hon. Sir Edward Paget, GCB
- 1849–1854: Lt-Gen. John Duffy, CB, KC
- 1854–1878: Gen. Sir Henry John William Bentinck, KCB
- 1878–1880: Gen. Thomas Brooke
- 1880–1881: Gen. Julius Edmund Goodwyn, CB

== Sources ==
- Cadell, Charles (1835). Narrative of the campaigns of the Twenty-Eighth Regiment since their return from Egypt in 1802. Whittaker & Co.
- Daniell, David Scott (1951). Cap of Honour: The story of the Gloucestershire Regiment (the 28th/61st Foot) 1694-1950. London, George G. Harrap and Co.
- Grazebrook, R.M. (1946). "The Back Badge of the Gloucestershire Regiment". Army Historical Research. 24 (99). Society for Army Historical Research: 112–113. JSTOR 44220713.
