= Horfield Barracks =

Former military installation in Horfield, Bristol

- Bristol
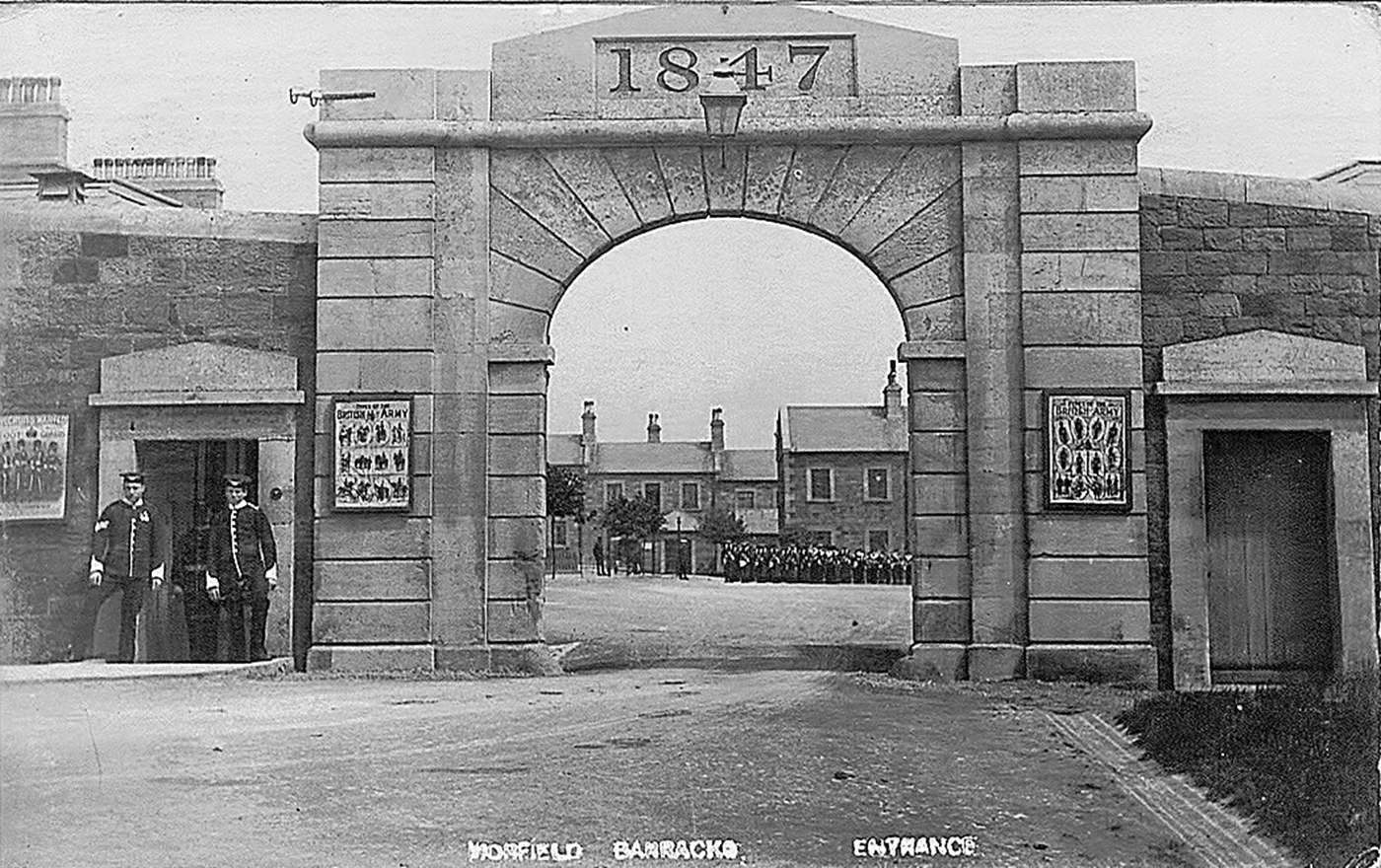
- Horfield Barracks entrance

Site information
- Type: Barracks
- Owner: Ministry of Defence
- Operator: British Army

Location
- Location within Bristol
- Coordinates: 51.49229°N 2.58330°W

Site history
- Built: 1843–1847
- Built for: War Office
- In use: 1847-1966

Garrison information
- Occupants: 3rd Battalion the Gloucestershire Regiment

Horfield Barracks is a former military installation in the Horfield area of Bristol.

== History ==
The barracks were built, largely in response to the Bristol riots of 1831, and completed between 1843 and 1847. During the Crimean War a mutiny took place and in 1868 a sergeant murdered a private soldier in a dispute over money. In 1873 a system of recruiting areas based on counties was instituted under the Cardwell Reforms and the barracks became the depot for the 28th (North Gloucestershire) Regiment of Foot and the 61st (South Gloucestershire) Regiment of Foot. Following the Childers Reforms, the 28th and 61st regiments amalgamated to form the Gloucestershire Regiment with its depot in the barracks in 1881. The 3rd Battalion (Royal South Gloucestershire Militia) of the regiment also established itself at Horfield Barracks.

During the First World War the barracks also served as the 5th cavalry depot providing accommodation for the 3rd The King's Own Hussars, the 7th Queen's Own Hussars, the 15th The King's Hussars and the 19th Royal Hussars. Life there is vividly recorded in the memoir of one soldier from Gloucestershire who was sent to Horfield as a new recruit, having joined up immediately following his 18th birthday.

The barracks were decommissioned after the Second World War and demolished in 1966. The site became a telephone engineering works in the late 1960s and was redeveloped for housing in around 2000. The former chapel survives as a nursery and is a grade II listed building
