= Edward Eliot (born 1618) =

English politician

Edward Eliot (1618 – c. 1710) was an English politician who sat in the House of Commons between 1660 and 1679.

Eliot was the son of Sir John Eliot of Port Eliot St Germans and his wife Radigund Gurdie, daughter of Richard Gurdie of Trebursey. He was educated at Blundell's School in Tiverton from 1629. On the death of his father in 1632 he inherited the Trebursey estate. He was commissioner for assessment in Cornwall from 1644 to 1652 and in 1657. In 1659 he was among a group of Cornish leaders who issued a proclamation at Truro calling for a free parliament.

In 1660, Eliot was elected Member of Parliament for Launceston in the Convention Parliament in a double return and was unseated on 29 June. In 1661 he was elected MP for St Germans for the Cavalier Parliament together with his brother John He was commissioner for assessment from 1660 to 1680 and from 1689 to 1707.

Eliot died before June 1710 when his will was proved.

Eliot married Anne Fortescue daughter of Francis Fortescue of Preston Devon.
