= John Eliot (statesman) =

English statesman (1592–1632)

Sir John Eliot
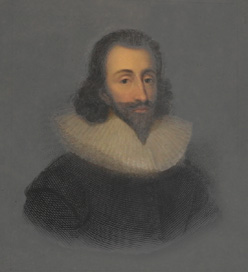
- Born: 11 April 1592; Cuddenbeak, Port Eliot, Cornwall, England
- Died: 27 November 1632 (aged 40); Tower of London, England
- Cause of death: tuberculosis
- Spouse: Radigund Gedie (or Gedy) (m. 1611–1628)
- Children: John Eliot; Richard Eliot; Elizabeth Eliot; Edward Eliot; Bridget Eliot; Radigunda Eliot; Susanna Eliot; Thomas Eliot; Nicholas Eliot
- Parents: Richard Eliot; Bridget Carswell

Signature
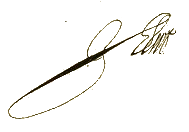

Sir John Eliot (11 April 1592 – 27 November 1632) was an English statesman who was serially imprisoned in the Tower of London, where he eventually died, by King Charles I for advocating the rights and privileges of Parliament.

== Early life ==
The son of Richard Eliot (1546 – 22 June 1609) and Bridget Carswell (c. 1542 – March 1617), he was born at Cuddenbeak, a farm on his father's Port Eliot estate in St Germans, Cornwall. He was baptised on 20 April at St German's Priory, immediately next to Port Eliot. The Eliot family were an old Devon family that had settled in Cornwall.

John Eliot was educated at Blundell's School, Tiverton, and matriculated at Exeter College, Oxford, on 4 December 1607, and, leaving the university after three years, he studied law at one of the Inns of Court. He also spent some months travelling in France, Spain and Italy, in company, for part of the time, with young George Villiers, afterwards 1st Duke of Buckingham.

== Parliamentary career ==
Eliot was only twenty-two when he began his parliamentary career as Member of Parliament for St Germans in the "Addled Parliament" of 1614. In May 1618, he was knighted, and next year through the patronage of Buckingham he obtained the appointment of Vice-Admiral of Devon, with large powers for the defence and control of the commerce of the county. It was not long before the characteristic energy with which he performed the duties in his office involved him in difficulties. After many attempts, in 1623, he succeeded by a clever but dangerous manoeuvre in entrapping the famous pirate John Nutt, who had for years plagued the southern coast, inflicting immense damage upon English commerce. However, the pirate, having a powerful protector at court in Sir George Calvert, the secretary of state, was pardoned; while the Vice-Admiral, upon charges which could not be substantiated, was flung into the Marshalsea prison, and detained there nearly four months.

A few weeks after his release, Eliot was elected Member of Parliament for Newport (February 1624). On 27 February, he delivered his first speech, in which he at once revealed his great powers as an orator, demanding boldly that the liberties and privileges of Parliament, repudiated by James I in the former Parliament, should be secured. In the first Parliament of Charles I, in 1625, he urged the enforcement of the laws against the Roman Catholics. Meanwhile, he had continued the friend and supporter of Buckingham and greatly approved of the war with Spain.

Buckingham's incompetence, however, and the bad faith with which both he and the King continued to treat the parliament, alienated Eliot. Distrust of his former friend quickly grew in Eliot's mind to a certainty of his criminal ambition. Returned to the parliament of 1626 as Member for St Germans and in the absence of other leaders of the opposition whom the King had secured by nominating them sheriffs, Eliot found himself the leader of the House. He immediately demanded an inquiry into the recent disaster at Cádiz. On 27 March, he made an open and daring attack upon Buckingham and his administration. He was not intimidated by the King's threatening intervention on 29 March, and persuaded the House to defer the actual grant of the subsidies and to present a remonstrance to the King, declaring its right to examine the conduct of ministers. On 8 May, he was one of the managers who carried Buckingham's impeachment to the Lords and, on 10 May, he delivered the charges against him, comparing him in the course of his speech to Sejanus.

Next day, Eliot was sent to the Tower. When the Commons declined to proceed with business as long as Eliot and Sir Dudley Digges (who had been imprisoned with him) were in confinement, they were released, and Parliament was dissolved on 15 June. Eliot was immediately dismissed from his office of Vice-Admiral of Devon, and, in 1627, he was again imprisoned for refusing to pay a forced loan, but liberated shortly before the assembling of the Parliament of 1628, to which he was returned as Member for Cornwall. He joined in the resistance now organised to arbitrary taxation, was foremost in the promotion of the Petition of Right, continued his outspoken censure of Buckingham, and after the latter's assassination in August, led the attack, in the session of 1629, on the ritualists and Arminians.

In February 1629 the great question of the right of the King to levy tonnage and poundage came up for discussion. On the King ordering an adjournment of Parliament, the speaker, Sir John Finch, was held down in the chair by Denzil Holles and Benjamin Valentine while Eliot's resolutions against illegal taxation and innovations in religion were read to the House. In consequence, Eliot, with eight other members, was imprisoned on 4 March in the Tower. He refused to answer in his examination, relying on his parliamentary privilege and, on 29 October, was again sent to the Marshalsea. On 26 January, he appeared at the bar of the King's Bench, in front of Lord Chief Justice Sir Nicholas Hyde, with Holles and Valentine, to answer a charge of conspiracy to resist the King's order, and refusing to acknowledge the jurisdiction of the court (see R v. Eliot, Hollis and Valentine.) He was fined £2000 and ordered to be imprisoned during the King's pleasure and till he had made submission. This he steadfastly refused. While some of the prisoners appear to have had certain liberty allowed to them, Eliot's confinement in the Tower was made exceptionally severe. Charles's anger had always been directed chiefly against him, not only as his own political antagonist but also as the prosecutor and bitter enemy of Buckingham; "an outlawed man," he described him, "desperate in mind and fortune."

== Works ==
Eliot languished in prison for some time, during which he wrote several works:

- Negotium posterorum, an account of the parliament in 1625;
- The Monarchie of Man, a political treatise;
- De jure majestatis, a Political Treatise of Government, which is in large part a summary of a work by Henning Arnisaeus;
- An Apology for Socrates, his own defence.

== Death and burial ==
In the spring of 1632, he fell into a decline. In October he petitioned Charles for permission to go into the country, but leave could be obtained only at the price of submission and was finally refused. He died of consumption on 27 November 1632, and was buried at St Peter's Ad Vincula Church within the Tower.

When his son requested permission to move the body to St Germans, Charles refused, saying: "Let Sir John Eliot be buried in the church of that parish where he died." The suspicious manner of Eliot's death, as the result of the King's implacability and severe treatment, had more effect, probably, than any other single incident in embittering and precipitating the dispute between King and parliament. Eliot was a great orator, inspired by enthusiasm and high ideals, which he was able to communicate to his hearers by his eloquence.

In 1668, the House of Lords reversed his conviction, restating the law in Strode's case, affirming that the conviction "...was an illegal judgment, and against the freedom and privilege of Parliament".

== Family ==
In June 1609, Eliot married Radigund (or Rhadagund), (c. 1595 – June 1628), daughter of Richard Gedie of Trebursye in Cornwall, by whom he had five sons and four daughters:

1. John Eliot (18 October 1612 – March 1685), who married Honora Norton (1611-1652), daughter of Sir Daniel Norton
2. Richard Eliot (c. 1614 – unknown) - see below
3. Elizabeth Eliot (c. December 1616 – unknown), who married Nathaniel Fiennes (1608-1669) as his first wife
4. Edward Eliot (c. July 1618 – 1710), who married Anna Fortescue, sister of Sir Peter Fortescue
5. Bridget Eliot (c. April 1620 – unknown), who married Sir Peter Fortescue (1620-85), 1st Baronet
6. Radigunda Eliot (c. October 1622 – unknown)
7. Susanna Eliot (c. October 1624 – BEF 1663), who married Edward Norton (1618–80), son of Sir Daniel Norton
8. Thomas Eliot (c. September 1626 – BEF 1630)
9. Nicholas Eliot (c. June 1628 – BEF 1689), who married Katherine Prideaux (1632–89)

The current Earls of St Germans (1815 creation) are descended from the youngest son, Nicholas.

=== Richard Eliot ===
Richard Eliot (1614-69) was the wayward second son of Sir John Eliot and Rhadigund Geddy. Richard went to the University of Oxford at his father's suggestion, but did not fare well with academic life. He became embroiled at Oxford in various difficulties, which are mentioned without further detail in his father's writings. Further problems ensued when Richard failed or refused to visit his father in the Tower. As a result, Richard seems to have disappeared compared to his siblings. It is known that he went to the Low Countries under Sir Edward Howard around February 1632. Richard died before 1669 when his brothers, John and Edward, argued over the inheritance of Richard's lands in Cornwall.

General Granville Elliott (1713 - 59) spent much time and effort trying to prove that Richard Eliot had married Catherine Killigrew (1618 - 89), and had a child George Elliott born around 1636. However, documents survive that show that Richard died ob cael, i.e. a bachelor, and that, in 1656, Catherine was known as a spinster aged 38. It is likely, however, that George Elliott was the illegitimate son of Richard and Catherine. He was also progenitor of the Eliot military family.

== Ancestors ==
Ancestors of John Eliot (statesman)

32. William Eliot
16. John Eliot (1442-1480)
33. Joan Coteland
8. Edward Eliot (died 1522)
34. John Bonville
17. Joan Bonville
35. Joanna Wiberry
4. Thomas Eliot (1505-)
18. Robert Guye
9. Alice Guye
2. Richard Eliot (1546-1609)
10. John Norbrooke
5. Joan Norbroke (1530-)
1. John Eliot (1592-1632)
48. William Carswell
24. John Carswell
49. Christian Pralle
12. William Carswell (died 1546)
50. William Hill
25. Alice Hill
6. Nicholas Carswell (died 1588)
52. William Paulet (died 1488)
26. Amias Paulet (d. 1538)
53. Elizabeth Denebaud
13. Elizabeth Paulet
27. Laura Kellaway
3. Bridget Carswell (1542-1618)
56. Martin Fortescue
28. John Fortescue
57. Elizabeth Deynsell
14. Bartholomew Fortescue
58. Ralph St Leger
29. Jacqueta St Leger
7. Ellen Fortescue (died 1604)
30. Maurice Moore
15. Ellen Moore
62. John Bonville
31. Cecily Bonville
63. Alice Dennis

== Sources ==
- Life of Sir J. Eliot, by J Forster (1864) as supplemented and corrected by
- Gardiner's History of England, vols. v.-vii.,
- Gardiner, Samuel Rawson (1889). "Eliot, John (1592-1632)" . In Stephen, Leslie (ed.). Dictionary of National Biography. Vol. 17. London: Smith, Elder & Co.
- Eliot's writings, together with his Letter-Book, have been edited by Dr Grosart.
