= Hewett baronets =

Set index for Shelley baronets

There have been three baronetcies created for persons with the surname Hewett, one in the Baronetage of England and two in the Baronetage of the United Kingdom. One is extant as of 2026.

- Hewett baronets of Pishiobury (1660): see Viscount Hewett
- Hewett baronets of Nether Seale (1813)
- Hewett baronets of Chesterfield Street (1883)
