= William Hewett (British Army officer) =

British Army officer (born 1795)

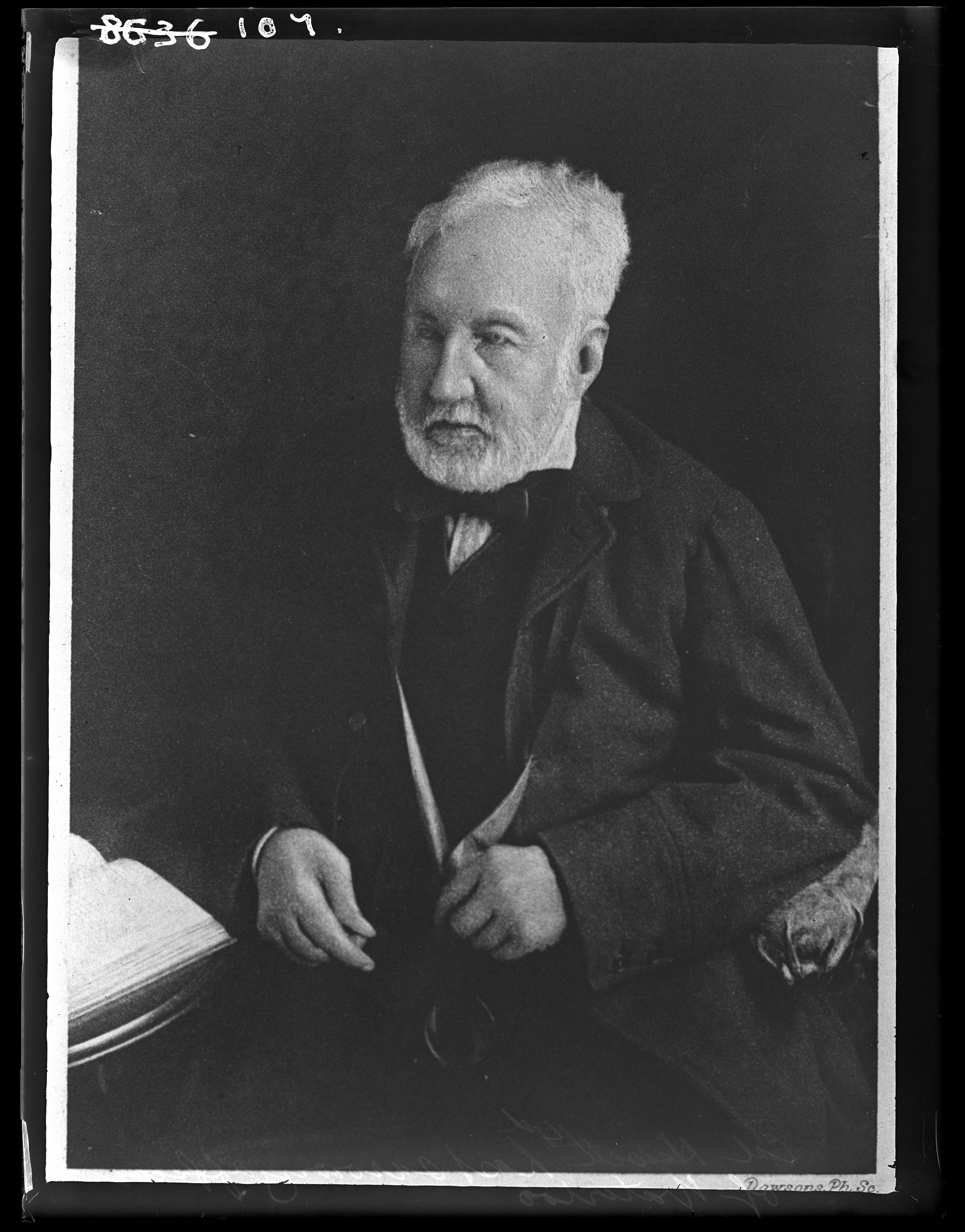
Hewett, c. 1880

Lieutenant-Colonel William Hewett (2 July 1795 – 26 October 1891) was a British Army officer. The son of General Sir George Hewett, he served in five regiments during the wars of the fifth and sixth coalition. During the Hundred Days he rejoined his original regiment, the 14th Regiment of Foot, as a captain and saw action at the Battle of Waterloo. After the war he served with another former regiment, the 33rd (or First Yorkshire West Riding) Regiment, before joining the Rifle Brigade. Hewett ended his career as a lieutenant-colonel with the 53rd (Shropshire) Regiment of Foot. In later life he lived in Southampton and became the last surviving British officer to have served at Waterloo.

== Early life and career ==
Hewett was born at Parkhurst on the Isle of Wight in England on 2 July 1795. (Note: Walter Hamilton, writing in Notes and Queries in 1891, stated that 1795 was an error and Hewett's birth year was 1791. All other sources and Hewett's gravestone give 1795.) Hewett was the third son of British Army general and baronet Sir George Hewett.

Hewett was commissioned into the 14th (Bedfordshire) Regiment of Foot as an ensign on 14 December 1809. Around this time he served in the Napoleonic Wars, in the ill-fated Walcheren Campaign and under Admiral James Saumarez in the Baltic Sea.

By 21 July 1812 he was with the 22nd (Cheshire) Regiment of Foot when he was promoted to the rank of lieutenant, without purchase, in the colonial Bourbon Regiment. Seven days later Hewett was transferred to the 33rd (or First Yorkshire West Riding) Regiment, taking the place of a deceased officer. He purchased the rank of captain in the 92nd Regiment of Foot on 3 December 1814 and went onto half-pay.

== Waterloo and field officer career ==
With the return of exiled emperor Napoleon to France in 1815, during the Hundred Days, the British Army rapidly remobilised. Hewett returned to full-time service with the army with the 14th Regiment, which was now associated with Buckinghamshire. He saw action at the 18 June 1815 Battle of Waterloo as a junior captain with the regiment's 3rd battalion. One of Hewett's subalterns during the battle was George Keppel, the future general and Earl of Albemarle. After the allied victory he served with the army of occupation in Paris before returning to half pay as the army was reduced in size in early 1816. On 12 November 1816 he arranged to return to active duty by swapping places with a captain of the 33rd Regiment.

Hewett transferred into the Rifle Brigade on 14 August 1823. He purchased the rank of major on the unattached list on 10 September 1825 and returned to the Rifle Brigade in that rank on 8 June 1826. Hewett purchased the rank of lieutenant-colonel on the unattached list on 19 August 1828. He afterwards returned to half-pay to become lieutenant-colonel of the 33rd Foot on 6 May 1836. Hewett transferred to the 53rd (Shropshire) Regiment of Foot eight days later and retired the same day.

== Later life and legacy ==
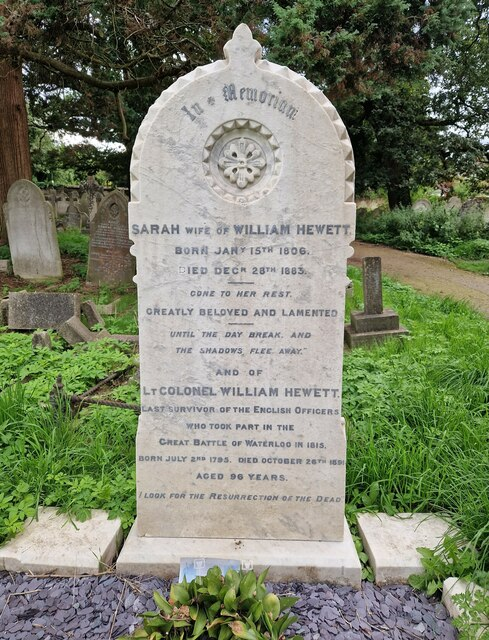
Hewett's grave, pictured in August 2023

In his later life, Hewett lived at East Park Terrace in Southampton and was cared for by his daughter. Hewett was a notable veteran of Waterloo and the Rifle Brigade wrote to him on the battle's anniversary each year to congratulate him. With Albemarle (b. 1799) and General George Whichcote (b. 1794), he was one of the last three surviving British officers who served in the battle. With Albemarle's February 1891 death and Whichcote's in August, Hewett became the last surviving officer. He died in Southampton on 26 October 1891 and his funeral was attended by a detachment from the Rifle Brigade. Hewett was buried at Southampton Old Cemetery, which also held the grave of fellow Waterloo veteran, Private John Russell, of the 3rd Regiment of Foot (d. 1864). Hewett's gravestone notes a wife, Sarah (1806-1883).

A son, James Duff Hewett, served as a captain in the New Zealand Wanganui Militia. James was killed by Māori in February 1865 during the New Zealand Wars. His killers took a sword that had been carried by William Hewett at Waterloo. It was later recaptured and returned to the family. In 2023, Hewett and Russell's graves were restored by the Napoleonic & Revolutionary War Graves Charity and the Friends of Southampton Old Cemetery and, on the eve of the 208th anniversary of the Battle of Waterloo, a memorial service was held at the gravesides of the two men.
