= William Hewlett =

William Hewlett may refer to:

- William Hewlet (fl.1630s–1660), convicted of executing Charles I of England in 1649 but reprieved
- Bill Hewlett (1913–2001), American engineer and co-founder of the Hewlett-Packard Company
- Will Hewlett (1876–1921), Welsh trade unionist and socialist activist
- W. H. Hewlett (1873–1940), Canadian composer, organist, and choir conductor

== See also ==
- William Hewett
- William Hewitt (disambiguation)
