= John Eliot (died 1685) =

English politician

John Eliot (18 October 1612 – March 1685) of Port Eliot, St Germans, Cornwall was an English politician who sat in the House of Commons in 1640 and from 1660 to 1685.

Port Eliot House, St Germans, Cornwall

Eliot was the son of Sir John Eliot of Port Eliot. He was educated at Blundell's School in Tiverton and at Lincoln College, Oxford. He travelled in France in 1631 and 1632 and succeeded to an estate of £1,500 per annum on the death of his father in 1632.

In April 1640, Eliot was elected Member of Parliament for St Germans in the Short Parliament. He played little part in the English Civil War but was on the County Committee in 1644. He was voted £7,000 compensation by the Long Parliament in 1647 for damage to his estates caused by the Royalists.

In 1660, Eliot was elected MP for St Germans in the Convention Parliament and was re-elected to the Cavalier Parliament in 1661. He sat until 1679.

Eliot died at the age of 72 and was buried at St Germans on 25 March 1685.

Eliot married Honora Norton, daughter of Sir Daniel Norton of Southwick Hampshire. Their sons Daniel Eliot (1646-1702) and Richard Eliot (1652-1685) also served as Member of Parliament for St Germans.

Parliament of England
Vacant Parliament suspended since 1629	Member of Parliament for St Germans; 1640 (April); With: William Scawen	Succeeded by Benjamin Valentine; John Moyle
Vacant Not represented in Restored Rump	Member of Parliament for St Germans; 1660-1679; With: Richard Knightley 1660; Edward Eliot 1661–1679	Succeeded by Daniel Eliot; Richard Eliot
