= George Elliott (surgeon) =

English doctor

- Born: c. 1636
- Died: 1669, aged c. 32; Tangier Garrison
- Occupation: Doctor
- Spouse: Katherine Maxwell (m. 1654–1668)
- Children: Katherine Elliott; Margaret Elliott; Roger Elliott
- Parents: Richard Eliot; Catherine Killigrew

George Elliott (c. 1636 – 1668 in Tangier) was the English surgeon to the Earl of Teviot's Regiment.

== Life ==
Elliott was the illegitimate son of Catherine Killigrew (1618–1689) and Richard Eliot (c. 1614-1660s), the wayward second son of Sir John Eliot. George Elliott's grandson Granville Elliott spent much effort in seeking to prove that Richard had married Catherine Killigrew, but he was never able to do so formally. Indeed, visitations survive showing that Richard died a bachelor and her mother's probate documents showing that Catherine was a spinster, aged 38, on 24 December 1656.

Little is known of Elliott's early years until his marriage to Katherine Maxwell in 1654. By 4 May 1663, around the time of the baptism of his second daughter in London, he was recognized as 'Doctor' to the Earl of Teviot's Regiment. He reappeared at the Tangier Garrison in Morocco in May 1664 as the 'Chirurgeon to the Earl of Teviot's Regiment at Tangier', where he lived at the Mole, a waterside fortification.

== Family ==
On 18 January 1654 at St Olave Silver Street, London, Elliott married Katherine Maxwell (c. 1638 – December 1709), the daughter of the Rev. William Maxwell of Minnigaff (d. 1655). They had at least two daughters and one son:

1. Katherine Elliott (bapt 14 December 1660 St Mary Somerset, London – unknown)
2. Margaret Elliott (bapt 3 May 1663 St Benet's, Paul's Wharf, London – unknown), who married firstly (before 7 March 1714) Richard Andrews, and secondly (after 7 March 1714) Richard Giles
3. Roger Elliott (c. 1665 – 15 May 1714 Barnes, Surrey), who married Charlotte Elliot at St Peter upon Cornhill, London on 4 March 1712

In 1668, Elliott died at Tangier, where he was succeeded as Chirurgeon by his assistant, Robert Spotswood (17 September 1637 – 1680), who also married Elliott's widow, by whom he had a son, Alexander Spotswood.
