= 61st (South Gloucestershire) Regiment of Foot =

- Active: 10 December 1756–1 July 1881
- Country: Kingdom of Great Britain (1756–1800); United Kingdom (1801–1881)
- Branch: British Army
- Type: Line Infantry
- Garrison/HQ: Horfield Barracks, Bristol
- Nicknames: The Flowers of Toulouse; The Springers
- Colors: Buff facings
- March: The Highland Piper
- Engagements: Seven Years' War; Peninsular War; Second Anglo-Sikh War; Indian Rebellion of 1857

The 61st (South Gloucestershire) Regiment of Foot was an infantry regiment of the British Army, raised in 1756. Under the Childers Reforms it amalgamated with the 28th (North Gloucestershire) Regiment of Foot to form the Gloucestershire Regiment in 1881.

== History ==
=== Formation ===
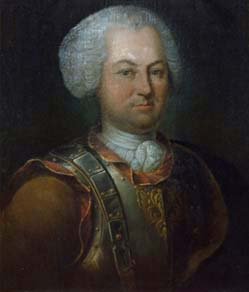
Major-General Granville Elliott who was colonel of the regiment during its campaign in the West Indies in 1758

The formation of the regiment was prompted by the expansion of the army as a result of the commencement of the Seven Years' War. On 25 August 1756 it was ordered that a number of existing regiments should raise a second battalion; among those chosen was the 3rd Regiment of Foot. The 2nd Battalion of the 3rd Foot was formed on 10 December 1756. In September 1757 both battalions of the 3rd Foot took part in an assault of the French coast. They returned to England in October, and on 21 April 1758 the 2nd Battalion became the 61st Regiment of Foot, with Major General Granville Elliott as colonel. The new regiment retained the buff facings of the 3rd Foot.

=== Early wars ===
In late 1758 the 61st Foot embarked for the West Indies. On 16 January 1759 they took part in the attempted Invasion of Martinique, but were forced to withdraw after three days. On 24 January they landed on Guadeloupe. Following more than three months of heavy fighting, the French forces surrendered on 1 May. The regiment returned to England in the summer of 1760 where they engaged in recruiting to make up for the casualties suffered in the West Indies.

After a period of garrison service in England, Ireland and the Channel Islands the 61st Foot was stationed on the island of Menorca in 1771. The island had become a British possession under the Treaty of Paris of 1763. By 1779 Britain was involved in a war with America, France and Spain, and in August 1781 a Franco-Spanish force began an attack. The 61st found themselves besieged in Fort St Philip. By February 1782 the garrison's numbers had been greatly reduced by dysentery and they surrendered. The remains of the regiment were repatriated in May 1782 where they began recruiting. In August 1782 all regiments of foot without a royal title were given a county designation, and the regiment became the 61st (South Gloucestershire) Regiment of Foot in 1782. In 1783 the regiment moved to Ireland where it remained until 1792. In the latter year they moved to Gibraltar.

=== French Revolutionary and Napoleonic Wars ===
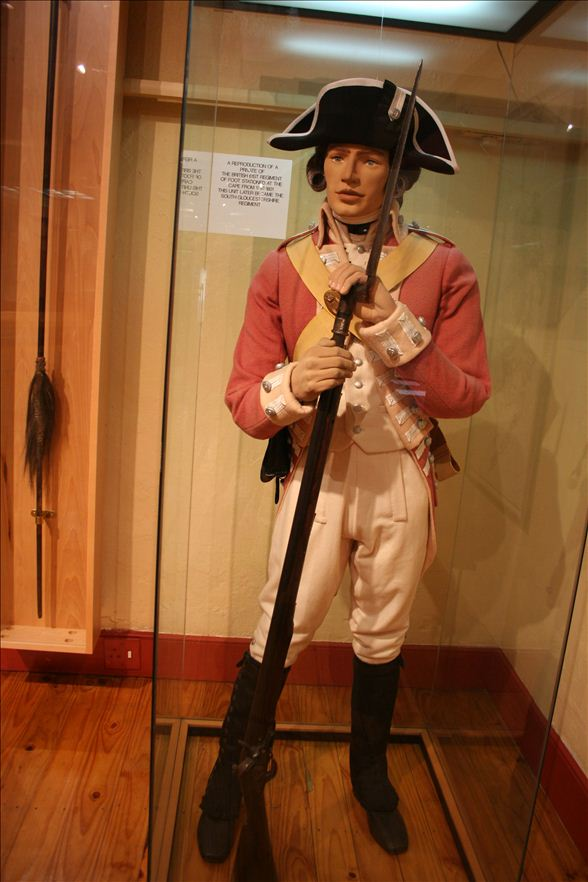
Model of a regimental private during the regiment's service in the Cape Colony from 1797 to 1801

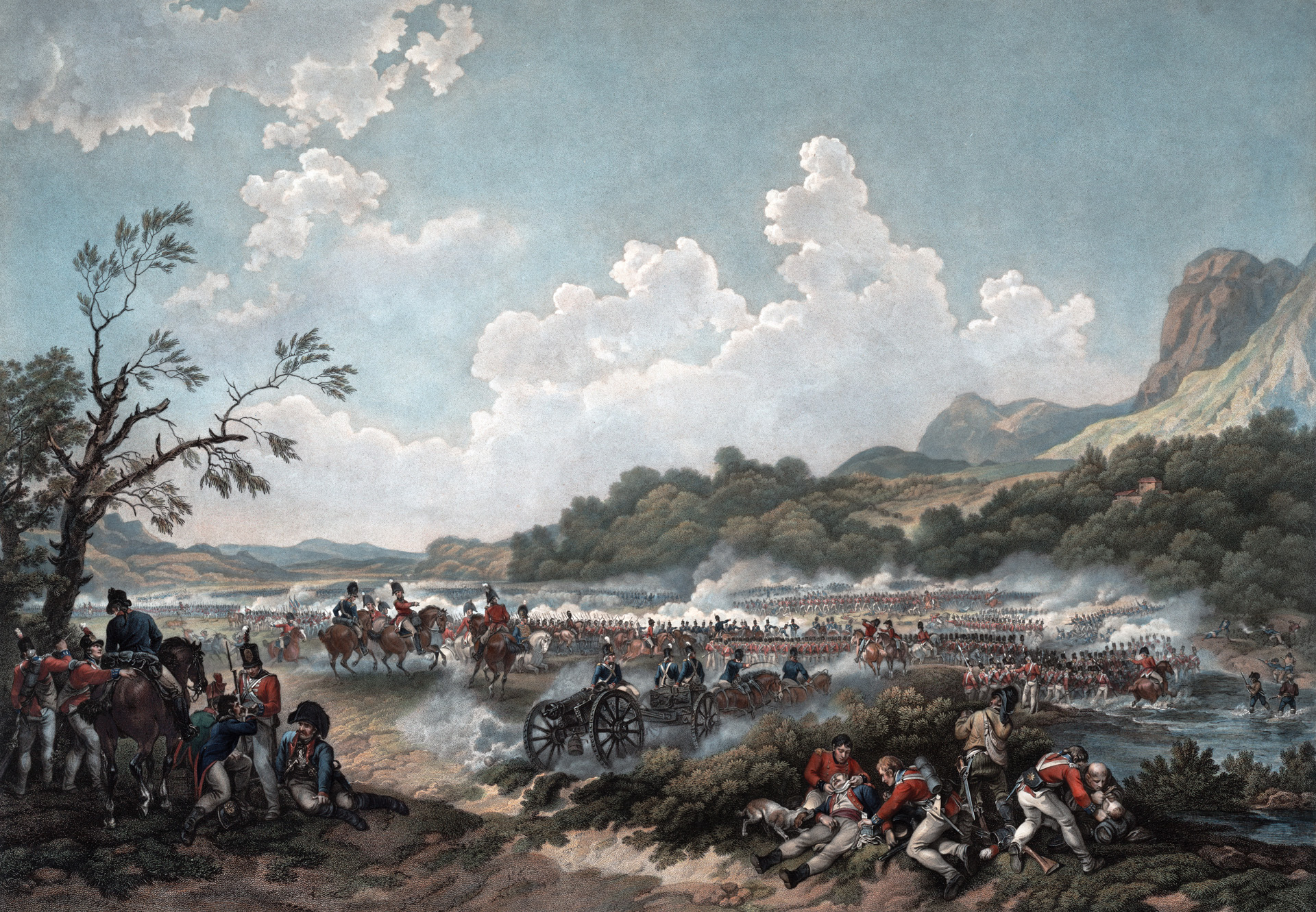
The Battle of Maida, which the regiment fought in

On 1 February 1793 Britain became involved in the French Revolutionary Wars, and the regiment were once again dispatched to the Caribbean, landing in Martinique in December 1794. In April 1795 they moved to St Lucia as part of the force under Brigadier-General James Stewart. Forced to return to Martinique three months later, in the following year they returned to St Lucia as part of a successful invasion. The regiment had suffered very heavy casualties and returned to England in October 1796 to be made up to strength. They moved to Guernsey in 1797, and to the Cape of Good Hope in 1799.

In 1801 the regiment proceeded to Egypt where they took part in the campaign to expel the French Armée d'Orient from the country. In 1802 the regiment was awarded the badge of a sphinx superscribed "Egypt" for display on the regimental colours in commemoration of the campaign.

In 1803 the regiment moved to Malta, and in July of the same year the existing regiment was redesignated as 1st Battalion, 61st (South Gloucestershire) Regiment of Foot when a second battalion was raised in County Durham and Northumberland. The 2nd Battalion was raised as part of the expansion of the army in response to the threat of invasion by France, and spent its entire existence in England and Ireland, before being disbanded in October 1814.

In November the First Battalion (or 1/61st) landed in Italy. Early in the following year they were forced to evacuate to Sicily, along with the deposed King Ferdinand IV. The flank companies 1/61st returned to the Italian mainland in June 1806 as part of the force commanded by Major-General John Stuart, and took part in the Battle of Maida on 4 July. The battalion returned to Sicily soon after. In 1807 they moved to Gibraltar.

In June 1809 the 1/61st landed in Lisbon, Portugal and joined the army fighting under Sir Arthur Wellesley in Spain. They took part in the Battle of Talavera on 27–28 July. The 1st Battalion, which had seen heavy casualties, received a draft of 300 men from the 2nd Battalion in February 1810, bringing up to full strength. They saw action in a number of minor engagements taking part in the Battle of Salamanca (22 July 1812) and the Siege of Burgos (September - October 1812), the Battle of the Pyrenees (July - August 1813). They pursued the retreating French forces into France, fighting at the Battle of Nivelle (November 1813), Battle of the Nive (December 1813), Battle of Orthez (February 1814) and the Battle of Toulouse in April 1814. The battalion's commanding officer, Lieutenant-Colonel Robert John Coghlan was killed at Toulouse. Within a few days French forces had capitulated and the 1/61st was moved to Bordeaux.

The 1st Battalion landed in Cork, Ireland in July 1814, proceeding to Dundalk where it absorbed the abolished 2nd Battalion in October.

=== The Victorian era ===
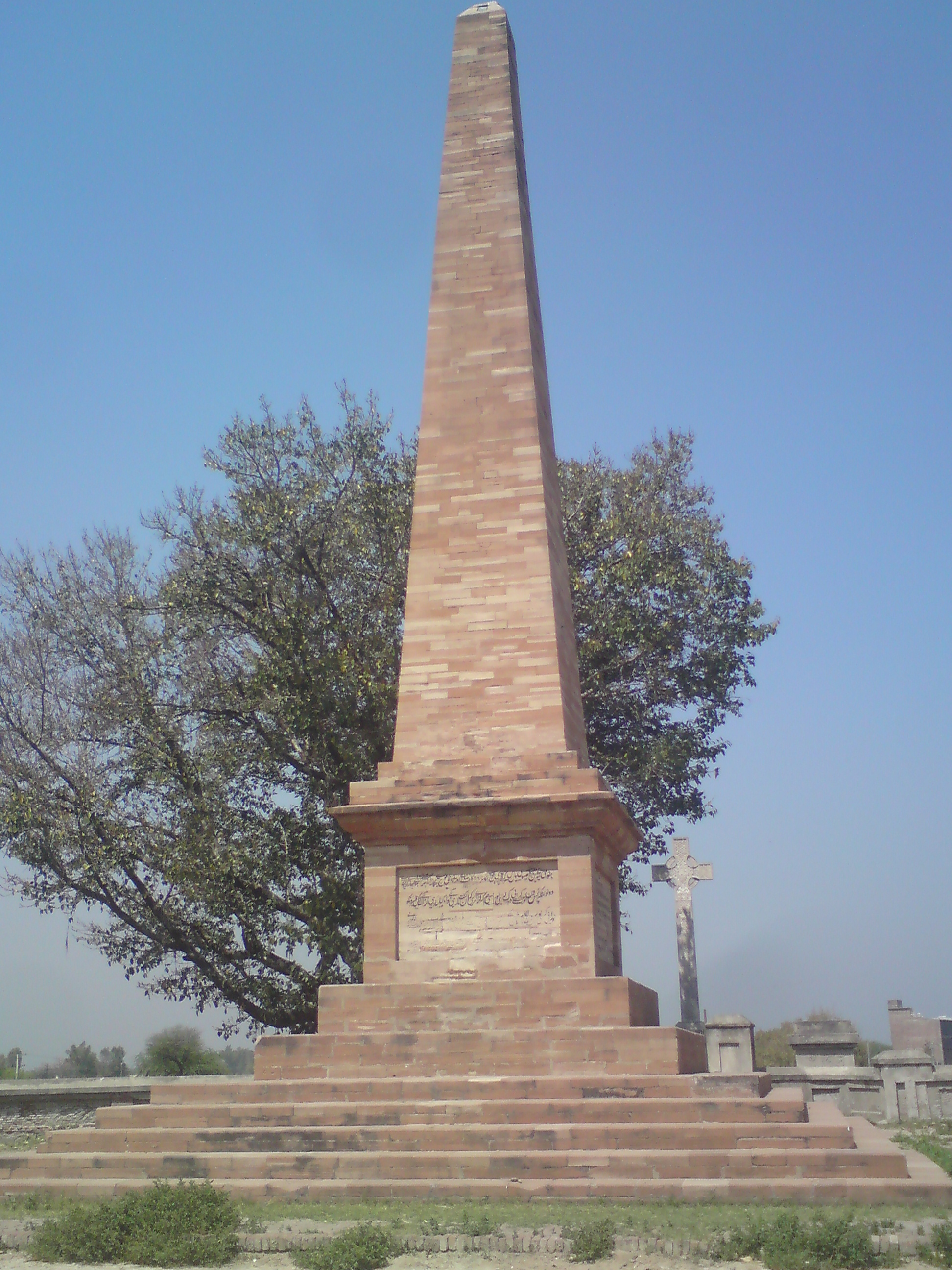
The monument erected in memory of the losses sustained by both armies at the Battles of Saddalupar and Chillianwala in January 1849

The 61st Foot spent more than thirty years on garrison duty before seeing active service again. From 1816 to 1822 they were stationed in Jamaica, from 1822 to 1828 in England and from 1828 to 1840 in Ceylon. They were stationed in England and Ireland from 1840 to 1845. In 1845 they moved to India, fighting in the Second Anglo-Sikh War of 1848–49: at the Battle of Ramnagar (November 1848), Battles of Saddalupar and Chillianwala (December 1848-January 1849) and Battle of Gujrat (February 1849). The regiment was still in India when Indian Rebellion of 1857 broke out. They took part in the Siege of Delhi.

Warwick Camp in 1869, with tents set up on the 800 yard rifle range and the military road under construction.

The remaining years of the 61st's existence as a separate regiment were uneventful. From India they moved to Mauritius in 1859 for a year before returning to England. Following garrison duty in the Channel Islands and Ireland, they moved to garrison the Imperial fortress of Bermuda in 1866, arriving on 22 October on HMS Orontes from Quebec with 715 rank and file, 80 women, and 103 children. Regimental Headquarters and a portion of the strength were delivered immediately to St. George's Garrison by the steamer HMS Spitfire (remaining there until moving to Prospect Camp on 27 April 1868, clearing the Royal Barracks at St. George's to be taken over by the 1st Battalion, 15th (The Yorkshire East Riding) Regiment of Foot, which arrived from New Brunswick the following day), while the rest encamped at the Royal Naval Dockyard on the island of Ireland before moving into the Casemates Barracks there. A detachment of the regiment would move to Boaz Island in April, 1868. Commanding Officer, Colonel William Freeland Brett, as the second-most senior officer in the Bermuda Command (after the Governor and Commander-in-Chief of Bermuda, Colonel Harry St. George Ord, CB, Royal Engineers), assumed the office of Commandant of Troops, Bermuda (or Officer Commanding Troops, Bermuda). As an Imperial fortress, the Commandant of Troops served as Lieutenant-Governor (at various times also designated Officer Administering the Government, Acting Governor, and Deputy Governor) in the absence from Bermuda, or the death, of the Governor, and Brett served as Lieutenant-Governor and Commander-in-Chief of Bermuda in 1866, pending the arrival of the newly-appointed Governor, Major-General Sir John Henry Lefroy, Royal Artillery. Surgeon-Major Usher Williamson Evans of the regiment was appointed the Principal Medical Officer of the Bermuda Command. Not all of the regiment's time was spent on training and guard duties as construction and development of defence works at Bermuda was continuous, and labour was both expensive and scarce and the last of the convict labourers previously used for Government works had been removed from Bermuda in 1863 on the completion of work at the Royal Naval Dockyard. Sixty to eighty men were posted to Ferry Reach in November, 1867, to work under Captain James Grantham, Royal Engineers, in the construction of the causeway that was to link St. George's Island with the Main Island.

The regiment departed Bermuda on 20 December 1870, when it marched from Prospect Camp to the City of Hamilton, embarking on HMS Vixen for transfer to HMS Himalaya at the Royal Naval Dockyard, which carried the regiment to Halifax, Nova Scotia, Canada. The regiment had lost 37 men in Bermuda, including Private Vincent Hodge Kinson, who shot himself at the Casemates Barracks on Ireland Island on the 6th of December, 1867, in a fit of temporary insanity, Private William Johnson, who fell into a ditch near the same barracks on the night of 15 December 1867, and six men during the last year at Bermuda, one of whom had died of each of the following causes: dysentery, Pthisis Pul, Haemoptyses, coma, excess of spirits, and drinking a quantity of Murray's disinfecting fluid while in a fit of delirium tremens. In 1872 they moved to Ireland. In 1873, under the Cardwell Reforms, the United Kingdom was divided into 66 "Brigade Districts" which generally corresponded to one or more counties. A depot was to be established, which would be the home for two regular infantry battalions. At any one time one of the regular battalions was to be on "home" service and the other on "foreign" duty, with the roles being rotated from time to time. The county militia regiments were also to share the depots. The 61st Foot were linked with the 28th (North Gloucestershire) Regiment of Foot and assigned to district no. 37 at Horfield Barracks in Bristol. The 61st subsequently moved to the Channel Islands in 1875, England in 1876 and Malta in 1878. In 1880 they returned to India. On 1 July 1881 the Childers Reforms came into effect and the 28th and 61st Regiments along with the militia regiments of Gloucestershire were amalgamated to form the Gloucestershire Regiment. The 61st Foot became 2nd Battalion, The Gloucestershire Regiment. Following two further amalgamations, the regiment's lineage is continued today by The Rifles.

== Battle honours ==
The 61st Foot were awarded the following battle honours for display on the regimental colours. (In some cases the spelling differs from the modern form):

- Maida (awarded 1807)
- Talavera (awarded 1821)
- Salamanca (awarded 1816)
- Pyrenees (awarded 1823)
- Nivelle (awarded 1816)
- Nive (awarded 1823)
- Orthes (awarded 1823)
- Toulouse (awarded 1816)
- Peninsula (awarded 1815)
- Chillianwallah (awarded 1852)
- Goojerat (awarded 1852)
- Punjaub (awarded 1852)
- Delhi 1857 (awarded 1863)
- The Sphinx superscribed "Egypt" (awarded 1802)

== Victoria Crosses ==
Herbert Taylor Reade was awarded the Victoria Cross for actions during the Indian Mutiny.

== Colonels of the Regiment ==
Colonels of the Regiment were:

- 1742–1743: Maj-Gen. Edward Richbell
- 1743–1747: Lt-Gen. John Folliott
- 1747–1748: Lt-Gen. Edward Pole
- Regiment disbanded 1748

=== 61st Regiment of Foot - (1758) ===
- 1758–1759: Maj-Gen. Granville Elliott
- 1759–1768: Lt-Gen. Sir George Gray, 3rd Baronet
- 1768–1773: Lt-Gen. John Gore
- 1773–1778: Maj-Gen. John Barlow
- 1778–1800: Gen. Staats Long Morris

=== 61st (the South Gloucestershire) Regiment of Foot - (1782) ===
- 1800–1840: Gen. Sir George Hewett, 1st Baronet, GCB
- 1840–1844: Lt-Gen. Sir John Gardiner, KCB
- 1844–1848: Lt-Gen. Sir Jeremiah Dickson, KCB
- 1848: Lt-Gen. George Guy Carleton L'Estrange, CB
- 1848–1852: Gen. Hastings Fraser, CB
- 1852–1864: Gen. John Reeve
- 1864–1870: Lt-Gen. Edward Hungerford Delaval Elers Napier
- 1870–1874: Gen. Sir Horatio Shirley, KCB
- 1874–1881: Gen. Sir Thomas Montagu Steele, GCB

== Sources ==
- Cannon, Richard (1844). Historical Record of the Sixty-First, or the South Gloucestershire Regiment of Foot. London: Parker, Furnivall and Parker.
- Sumner, Ian (2001). British Colours & Standards 1747-1881 (2) Infantry. Oxford: Osprey Publishing. ISBN 1841762016.
