= Jeanne Thérèse du Han =

Jeanne Thérèse du Han de Martigny
- Born: 30 October 1707; Lunéville, duchy of Lorraine
- Died: 7 May 1748 (aged 40); Nancy, duchy of Lorraine
- Title: Comtesse de Martigny
- Spouse: Granville Elliott (m. 1735–1748)
- Children: Marie Charlotte Elliott; Stanislaus Francois Xavier Elliott; Amable Gaspard Antoine Elliott; Charles Phillippe Elliott; Paul Antoine Elliott; François Maximillian Elliott; Jean-Baptiste-François Elliott
- Parents: Philippe-Louis du Han, comte de Martigny; Catherine Françoise de Roquefeuil de Puydebar

Jeanne Thérèse du Han de Martigny (30 October 1707 in Lunéville – 7 May 1748 in Nancy) was born and baptized the same day in Lunéville, in the duchy of Lorraine (then part the Holy Roman Empire, now part of France). She was the daughter of Philippe-Louis du Han, count of Martigny (1678–1733) and his wife Catherine Françoise de Roquefeuil de Puydebar (c.1680 – 1764). The Du Han de Martigny were an important noble family of Lorraine, with estates in the north of the duchy.

Louis-Philippe held posts as conseiller d'état, Chamberlain and Grand Veneur under Duke Léopold I, and his daughters were among the court beauties. In 1731, Jeanne-Thérèse was maid of honour to the Dowager Duchess and Regent of Lorraine, Léopold's widow.

After the outbreak of the War of the Austrian Succession, Granville Elliott spent most of his time away fighting.

Jeanne Thérèse and her husband Granville appear regularly in the Madame de Graffigny correspondence collated by the Voltaire Foundation at the University of Oxford.

== Family ==
She married Granville Elliott, Count Elliott, on 15 March 1735, in Mannheim, but the couple lived in Lorraine after their marriage, where they had one daughter and six sons:

1. Marie Charlotte Elliott (23 May 1736 – 3 February 1785)
2. Stanislaus François Xavier Elliott (7 June 1737 – 12 March 1767)
3. Amable Gaspard Antoine Elliott (4 September 1738 – 30 June 1814), 2nd Count Elliott
4. Charles Phillippe Elliott (1 December 1740 – AFT 1752)
5. Paul Antoine Elliott (12 June 1741 – 25 July 1741)
6. François Maximillian Elliott (12 June 1741 – BEF 1764)
7. Jean-Baptiste-François Elliott (25 June 1747 – BEF 1764)

Jeanne Thérèse died in Nancy on 7 July 1748 and was buried two days later in the nave of the Notre-Dame cathedral church in Nancy. Her body was reburied when the church was demolished and rebuilt in the 1790s.

Because Granville returned to Britain and remarried, he published a will for Jeanne Therese at London.
