= William Whistler =

American soldier

- Born: 1780
- Died: December 4, 1863 (aged 82–83); Newport, Kentucky, U.S.
- Education: United States Army
- Children: 6, including Joseph N. G. Whistler
- Parent(s): John Whistler and Anna Bishop
- Relatives: George Washington Whistler (brother); James McNeill Whistler (nephew); William McNeill Whistler (nephew); Walt Kinzie (grandson)

William Whistler (c. 1780 – December 4, 1863) served for over 60 years in the United States Army from 1801 to 1861. His career was one of the longest in the history of the U.S. Army. He was the uncle of the famous artist James Abbott McNeill Whistler.

== Biography ==
Whistler was commissioned a 2nd Lieutenant in the 1st Infantry in June 1801 and was promoted to 1st lieutenant in 1807. He was promoted to captain in December 1812. When the Army was reorganized after the War of 1812 the 1st Infantry was re-designated as the 3rd Infantry.

In addition to the War of 1812, Whistler fought in the Seminole Wars and Mexican–American War.

He was brevetted to the rank of major in December 1822 for serving ten years in the same grade. He was promoted to major and assigned to the 2nd Infantry in April 1826. He became the lieutenant colonel of the 7th Infantry in July 1834.

Whistler became the colonel of the 4th Infantry in July 1845. He retired from the Army in October 1861 and died on December 4, 1863 at his home in Newport, Kentucky.

== Family ==
Colonel Whistler was the father of six children:

- John Harrison Whistler (1807–1873)
- Caroline Frances Whistler Bloodgood (1810–1893)
- Mary Ann Whistler Paul (1815–1871)
- Gwinthlean Harriet Whistler Kinzie (1818–1894)
- Brevet Brigadier General Joseph N. G. Whistler (1822–1899)
- Louise Ann Whistler Helm (1828–1883), married Charles J. Helm

He was the brother of George Washington Whistler (1800–1849), a prominent civil engineer who was the father of the famous artist James Abbott McNeill Whistler.
