= Arthur Skinner =

Arthur Skinner may refer to:

- Arthur Skinner (police officer) (1874–1940), New Zealand policeman and athlete
- Arthur Skinner (sport shooter) (1919–1993), British sports shooter
- Arthur Banks Skinner (1861–1911), director of the Art Museum division of the Victoria and Albert Museum, London
