= John Granville Harkness =

Major-General John Granville Harkness JP
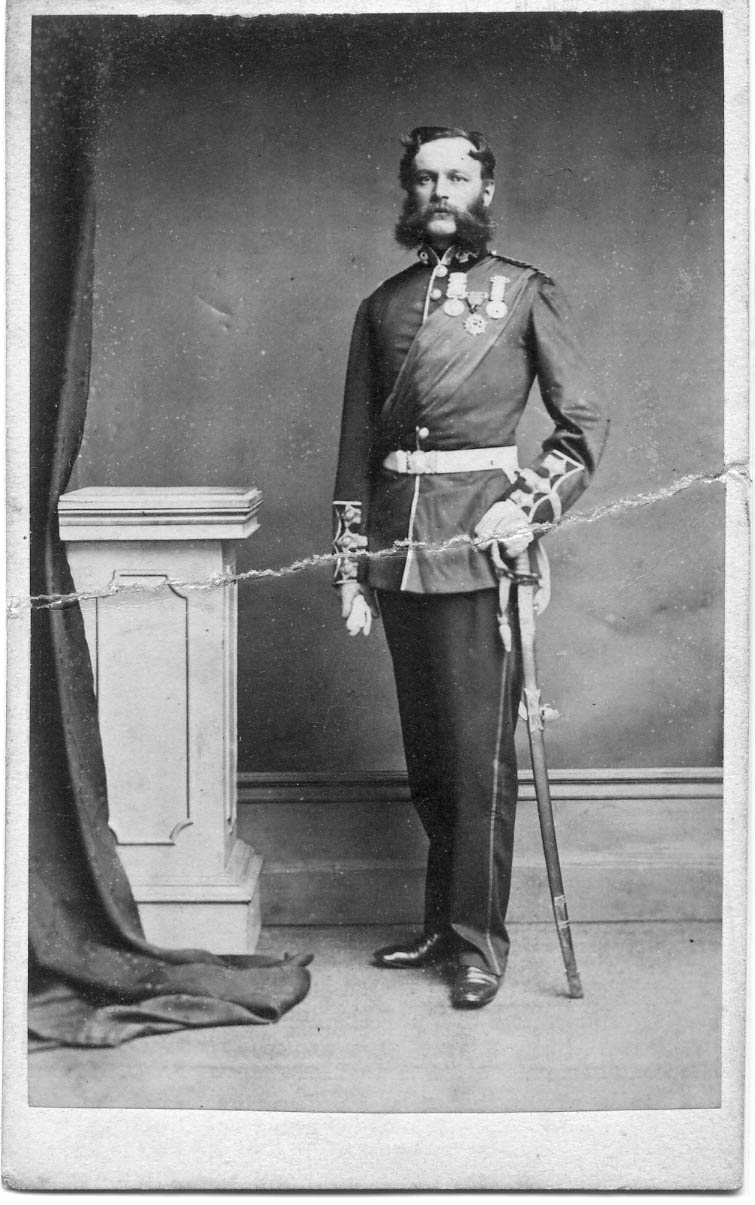
- Born: 29 January 1831; Limehouse, London
- Died: 22 June 1900 (aged 69); Ivy House, London Road, Ore, Hastings, Sussex
- Burial place: Hastings Cemetery, Sussex
- Spouse: Annabella Harriette James (m. 1864–1900)
- Military career
- Allegiance: United Kingdom
- Branch: 55th Regiment of Foot; 5th Fusiliers
- Service years: 1853–1886
- Rank: Major-General
- Conflicts: 1853: Crimean War; 1854: Battle of Alma; 1854: Battle of Inkerman; 1855: Assault on the Quarries; 1855: Siege of Sevastopol; 1855: Battle of the Great Redan; 1878–80: Second Anglo-Afghan War

John Granville Harkness JP (29 January 1831 – 22 June 1900) was a major-general in the British Army during the Victorian era.

== Early life ==
Harkness was born 29 January 1831 at Limehouse, London, to John Samuel Harkness, MD (1797–1842) and his wife Anne Harriette, née Eliot (1807–1884). As such, he descended from Northern Irish doctors on his paternal side and from a significant British military family on his maternal side. This side included his grandfather, Lieutenant-Colonel William Granville Eliot RHA, his great-grandfather Colonel Francis Perceval Eliot, his gg-grandfather, General Granville Elliott and his ggg-grandfather Major-General Roger Elliott. He was also a great-nephew of Captain Edward John Eliot.

During the 1830s, his family moved to Ivy Lodge, London Road, Ore, Hastings, Sussex, where he attended the Misses Borrow's Preparatory School, Hastings, and later Temple School, Brighton.

== Military career ==
Harkness entered the army on 13 May 1853 as Ensign in the 55th Regiment, without purchase – on the recommendation of the Duke of Wellington for his grandfather's service. In 1854, he was promoted to lieutenant and served throughout the Crimean Campaign 1854–55. He carried the Queen's colour at the Alma. For heroic conduct, both he and his friend, William Hamilton Richards, were nominated for the Victoria Cross by Major-General Sir Charles Warren. He fought at Inkerman, the assault on the Quarries, the sortie of 26 October 1854, the siege and the fall of Sevastopol and the Battle of the Great Redan. Two pencil drawings of the Crimea War by Harkness survive at the National Army Museum

In 1862, he was appointed to the 5th Fusiliers and ADC to Sir William Stevenson, the Governor of British Mauritius. He served in South Africa 1864–67. He was promoted brevet major in March 1872, and major in October 1877, before taking part in the Second Anglo-Afghan War 1878–1880. He commanded the column that cleared the entrance to the Khaibar or Khyber Pass. Having returned to Berwick, he was promoted to lieutenant-colonel in 1881 and colonel in July 1882.

During the disturbances in Ireland in 1882, he was appointed JP for the city and county of Dublin. He retired as a major-general in January 1886, and settled back at his childhood family house – Ivy House, Ore.

He held the Crimean medal with three clasps, fifth class of the Medjidie, and the Turkish and Afghan medals. He was mentioned in dispatches, twice wounded and in receipt of the reward for distinguished service pension.

== Family ==
On 2 June 1864 at St Helen's Church, Ore, Hastings, Sussex, Harkness married his first cousin Annabella Harriette James (1839 – 1928), with two daughters, both born in South Africa:

- Annabella Katherine or Violet Harkness (1 April 1865 – 10 May 1865)
- Edith Geraldine Harkness (19 June 1866 – 19 August 1946 Hastings)

He died on Friday 22 June 1900 at his home at Ivy House, Ore, and was buried on Tuesday 26 June 1900 at Hastings Cemetery

Military offices
Preceded by Unknown	Lieutenant of the 55th (Westmorland) Regiment of Foot; 1854-1862	Succeeded by Unknown
Preceded by Unknown	ADC of the 5th Fusiliers; 1862-1872	Succeeded by Unknown
Preceded by Unknown	Brevet-Major of the 5th Fusiliers; 1872-	Succeeded by Unknown
Preceded by Unknown	Major of the 5th Fusiliers; 1877-	Succeeded by Unknown
Preceded by Unknown	Lieutenant-Colonel of the 5th Fusiliers; 1881-	Succeeded by Unknown
Preceded by Unknown	Colonel of the 5th Fusiliers; 1882-	Succeeded by Unknown
Preceded by Unknown	Major-General; 1885-1886	Succeeded by Unknown
