= Edward John Eliot =

English soldier

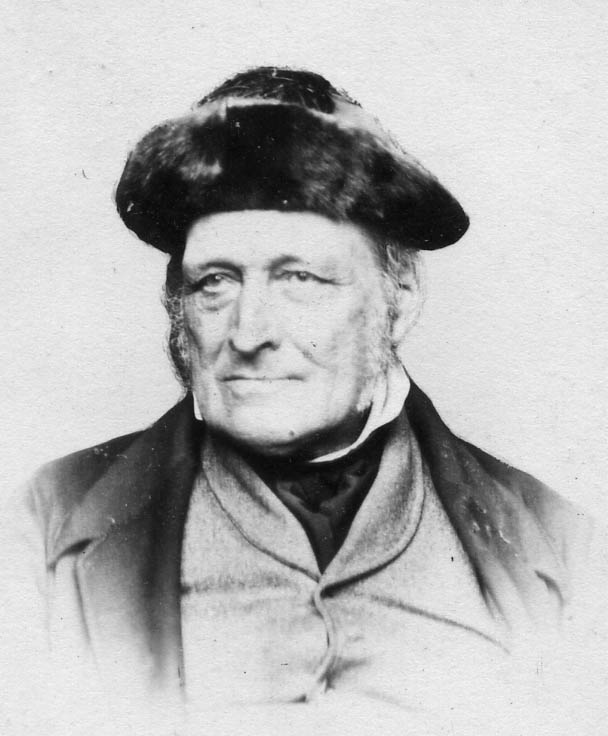
- with permission from The Eliot Sisters Collection
- Born: 20 September 1782; Shenstone, Staffordshire, England
- Died: 6 November 1863 (aged 81); Peckham, Surrey, England
- Burial place: Nunhead Cemetery, London
- Spouse: Margaret James (m. 1826–1863)
- Military career
- Allegiance: United Kingdom
- Branch: Army
- Rank: Captain
- Unit: Lord Hill's Flying Brigade
- Conflicts: Peninsular War; Battle of Vimeiro; Battle of Talavera; Battle of Bussaco; Defence of the Lines of Torres Vedras; Battle of Badajoz

Captain Edward John Eliot (20 September 1782 Shenstone, Staffordshire – 6 November 1863 Peckham, Surrey) was an English soldier.

Eliot was the son of Francis Perceval Eliot and his wife Anne née Breynton (daughter of Dr John Breynton). He was born into a military family - the son of a colonel, the grandson and great-grandson of generals, but he himself never rose above the rank of captain. His letters and papers form an important record of military life for this period.

He enrolled at the age of 15 into his father's 3rd Staffordshire Militia as an Ensign (1797), and a Lieutenant (1799). In 1799, he transferred as Ensign of the 62nd (Wiltshire) Regiment of Foot. His unit sailed from Ireland in May 1800 to the Île-d'Houat, in Quiberon Bay, where 40 years earlier the Battle of Quiberon Bay had been fought. However, bad weather prevented a landing and he went on to Menorca where stayed until at least October 1801. By October 1802, he was commissioned as a lieutenant and posted to Athenry in Ireland. He saw several excursions to the Mediterranean and was promoted to captain, 4th Garrison Battalion.

During 1807, the Peninsula War was beginning and Edward was among the first of the British troops to fight in the Iberian peninsula, alongside his older brother William Granville Eliot, who was in another regiment. Edward now saw major military action over the next 5 years, including the Battle of Vimiero (following which he was promoted to captain, 27th Inniskillen Regiment of Foot), the Battle of Talavera, Battle of Bussaco, Defence of the Lines of Torres Vedras, Battle of Badajoz. During this period, he fought in the elite Lord Hill's Flying Brigade.

Having fought in many of the major battles of the campaign, he returned home in 1812. Although he tried to rejoin his regiment, he was clearly unwell and in 1814 retired from the Army altogether aged just 32.

On 22 November 1826, he married Margaret James and had 6 children. The couple settled firstly in Greenwich, then Finsbury and eventually Peckham, Surrey, where he joined HM Customs as a landing waiter - a secure job for an ex-army officer.

The army had initially refused him the usual Peninsula campaign medals. However, following a protracted communication, these were finally awarded in the 1840s, 25 years after his return. Together with letters from the Peninsula War, this communication forms a substantial record of his military career.

He retired in the 1850s, died at Peckham in 1863 and is buried in Nunhead Cemetery.

== Family ==
On 22 November 1826, at All Saints' Church, Huntingdon, he married Margaret James (1802–1881), the daughter of George James (1760–1811), the captain, later colonel, of the Northumberland Regiment, and they had 6 children:

1. Edward James Eliot (1828–1905), who married Caroline Louisa Matilda Godfrey (1832–1897)
2. Francis George (Frank) Eliot (1831–1908), who married Elizabeth Anne Grey (1844–1889)
3. Henry Augustus Eliot (1833–1886), who married Mary Louisa Sarah Nash (1840–1928)
4. Margaret Frances Eliot (1837–1916)
5. John Percival Eliot (1840–1841)
6. William Frederick Eliot (1843–1932), who married Fanny Clarke (1845–1914)

His great-nephew was Major-General John Granville Harkness (1831 – 1900).

Military offices
Preceded by Unknown	Lieutenant of the 62nd (Wiltshire) Regiment of Foot; 1802-1807	Succeeded by Unknown
Preceded by Unknown	Captain of the 27th (Inniskilling) Regiment of Foot; 1807-1814	Succeeded by Unknown
