= Anna McNeill Whistler =

Mother of painter James McNeill Whistler (1804–1881)

Whistler's Mother, a portrait of Anna by her son, James McNeill Whistler (1871)

Anna Matilda (née McNeill) Whistler (September 27, 1804 – January 31, 1881) was the mother of American-born, British-based painter James McNeill Whistler, who made her the subject of his famous painting Arrangement in Grey and Black No.1, often titled Whistler's Mother.

== Biography ==
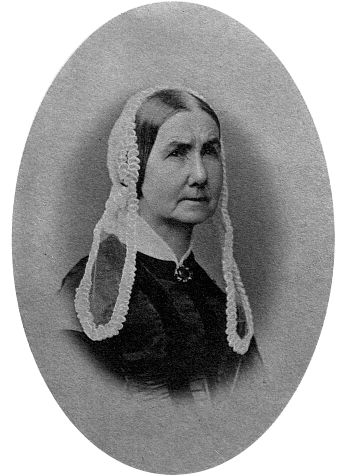
Anna Whistler circa 1850s

Anna McNeill Whistler was born in Wilmington, North Carolina, to Charles Daniel McNeill (1756–1828), a physician, and Martha Kingsley McNeill, daughter of Zephaniah Kingsley Sr. (one of the founders of the University of New Brunswick) and youngest sister of Zephaniah Kingsley (a slave trader and plantation owner, and the husband of the African Ana Madgigine Jai).

In 1831, she married George Washington Whistler, a civil engineer, former army officer, and widower who had three children. She gave birth to two sons, James McNeill Whistler and William McNeill Whistler. Her husband soon accepted a job in Russia as a railway engineer between Moscow and St. Petersburg. She had a son named Kirkie who died age four. A son named Charlie also died before Anna had moved to Russia.

When James was nine, his art brought the attention of Scottish painter Sir William Allan. Anna then enrolled James in the Imperial Academy of Arts at St. Petersburg.

After her husband died of cholera in 1849, Anna returned to the United States, to live in Connecticut. Her daughter remained in England after marrying a surgeon. It was then the family lived in poverty but her daughter helped William and James attend private school. James entered West Point just before his 17th birthday, was expelled soon after, and moved back to England. Her son William became a surgeon in the Confederate Army during the American Civil War.

In 1863, at the advice of her stepdaughter and son, she moved to England, moving in with her son James in London. She later relocated to St Mary's Terrace, Hastings, east Sussex. She was surprised by her son's "flamboyant Bohemian lifestyle"; however, she tolerated it, and befriended some of his friends as well. This was around the time the famous painting was made, although it was not the only one. Anna was 67 during the painting of the picture. She died a decade later and is buried in Hastings Cemetery.
