= George Monger =

Recipient of the Victoria Cross

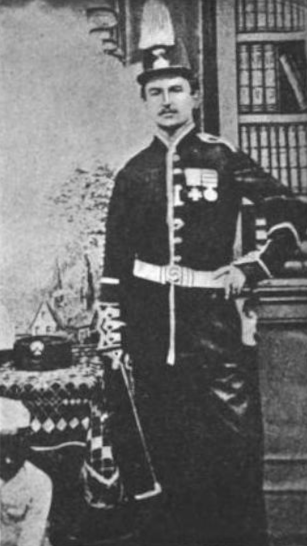
- Born: 3 March 1840; Woodmancott, Hampshire
- Died: 9 August 1887 (aged 47); St Leonards-on-Sea, East Sussex
- Burial place: Hastings Cemetery, East Sussex
- Military career
- Allegiance: United Kingdom
- Branch: British Army
- Rank: Private
- Units: 23rd Regiment of Foot
- Conflicts: Indian Mutiny
- Awards: Victoria Cross

George Monger VC (3 March 1840 – 9 August 1887) was an English recipient of the Victoria Cross, the highest and most prestigious award for gallantry in the face of the enemy that can be awarded to British and Commonwealth forces.

== Details ==
Monger was 17 years old, and a private in the 23rd Regiment of Foot (later The Royal Welch Fusiliers), British Army during the Indian Mutiny when the following deed took place on 18 November 1857 at Secundra Bagh, Lucknow, India for which he was awarded the VC: Private Monger volunteered to accompany an officer, Thomas Bernard Hackett, whom he assisted in rescuing a corporal of the 23rd Regiment of Foot, who was lying wounded and exposed to very heavy fire. His citation reads:

23rd Regiment, Private George Monger

Date of Act of Bravery, 18th November, 1857

For daring gallantry at Secundra Bagh, Lucknow, on the 18th of November, 1857, in having volunteered to accompany Lieutenant Hackett, whom he assisted in bringing in a Corporal of the 23rd Regiment, who was lying wounded in an exposed position.

== Further information ==
He died in 1887 at the age of 47 from tuberculosis. He is buried at Hastings Cemetery, East Sussex, in section H, grave E-18 common. The headstone was erected by local residents. A blue plaque is displayed on his former house in Tower Road, St Leonards-on-Sea, East Sussex. His Victoria Cross is displayed at the Royal Welch Fusiliers Museum at Caernarfon Castle, Gwynedd, Wales.
