= Thomas Davis (Medal of Honor) =

Welsh soldier who fought in the American Civil War

- Born: 11 December 1837; Haverfordwest, Wales
- Died: 24 March 1919 (aged 81); Maspeth, Queens, New York
- Military career
- Allegiance: United States
- Branch: United States Army
- Service years: 1863 - 1865
- Rank: Private
- Unit: (New York (state)) 2nd New York Volunteer Heavy Artillery Regiment - Company C
- Conflicts: Battle of Sayler's Creek
- Awards: Medal of Honor

Private Thomas Davis (or Davies; 11 December 1837 – 24 March 1919) was a Welsh soldier who fought in the American Civil War. Davis received the United States' highest award for bravery during combat, the Medal of Honor, for his action during the Battle of Sayler's Creek in Virginia on 6 April 1865. He was honored with the award on 3 May 1865.

== Biography ==
Davis was born in Haverfordwest, Wales on 11 December 1837. He joined the 2nd New York Heavy Artillery in December 1863, and mustered out with the regiment in September 1865. He died on 24 March 1919 and his remains are interred at the Mount Olivet Cemetery in New York.

== Medal of Honor citation ==
Capture of flag.

== See also ==
- List of American Civil War Medal of Honor recipients: A–F
