= Hastings Cemetery =

Cemetery in Sussex, England

Coordinates: 50.8792°N 0.5926°E

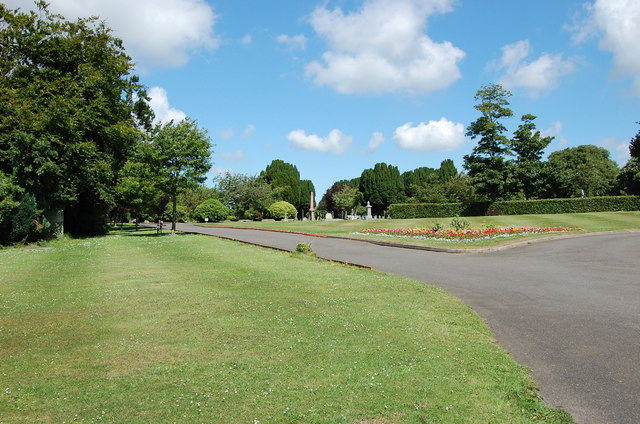
Hastings Cemetery

Hastings Cemetery is a cemetery in Hastings, East Sussex, located off the Ridge road.

The cemetery was opened on 28 November 1856. The Church of England section was consecrated by Ashurst Gilbert, Bishop of Chichester, followed by a service in All Saints Church.

Hastings Crematorium is located within the cemetery. It was built in 1955, incorporating two Gothic-style burial chapels built in 1856 of local sandstone.

== Notable burials ==
- Major-General Sir Edward Anson (1826–1925), army officer
- Frederick Chamier (1796–1870), Royal Navy officer and writer
- Major-General John Granville Harkness (1831–1900), army officer
- Arthur Foord Hughes (1856–1914), artist
- George Monger (1840–1887)
- W. S. Penley (1851–1912), singer, actor, and comedian
- Sergiusz Piasecki (1901–1964), Belarusian-Polish novelist
- Arthur Banks Skinner (1861–1911), director of the Victoria and Albert Museum
- R. Bailey Walker (1839–1885), clergyman, activist, editor, and writer
- Anna McNeill Whistler (1804–1881), the subject of the painting Whistler's Mother
- William McNeill Whistler (1836–1900)

== War graves ==
Hastings Cemetery contains the war graves of 176 Commonwealth service personnel (including two unidentified Royal Navy sailors) of World War I and 69 of World War II. Those whose graves could not be individually marked are listed on a Screen Wall Memorial. There are also buried here a Belgian army soldier of World War I and a German soldier and six German airmen of World War II.
