= Zephaniah Kingsley Sr. =

Zephaniah Kingsley Sr. (April 11, 1734 – circa 1792) was an affluent British merchant, a loyalist during the American Revolution and one of the seven founders of the University of New Brunswick, Canada's oldest English language university. He was the father of slave trader and plantation owner Zephaniah Kingsley Jr. and the grandfather of Anna McNeill Whistler — better known as "Whistler's Mother" in the painting Arrangement in Grey and Black No.1 by her son (and Kingsley's great-grandson) James McNeill Whistler.

== Early years ==
Son of Elizabeth Wright and Benjamin Kingsley, Zephaniah was born in Leake (Lincolnshire, England) into a third-generation family of Quakers. As a young man, he moved to London to become a cloth merchant. There he met Isabella Johnston (possibly of Dumfries, Scotland), whom he married in 1763 at the Church of St Mary LeBow, in London. After a brief stay in London, the couple moved to Bristol, where Kingsley established a retail business. In 1768, Kingsley filed for bankruptcy, and the family moved back to London the following year.

== Colonial America and the American Revolution ==
Kingsley emigrated with his wife and children to Charlestown (Province of South Carolina) in December 1770. Within three years, he had become a successful merchant of imported goods, owning several high-end properties and entering into multiple business partnerships.

Kingsley remained loyal to Great Britain during the American Revolution. Before the fighting started, Kingsley endured many hardships as a result of his loyalty to the Crown. During the 1774 disturbances opposing the Tea Act, Kingsley (along with other merchants) was forced by a violent mob to dump his tea consignment into the water. Mobs intimidated loyalists, going house to house, tarring and feathering some, and pressuring them to leave. Despite such harassment, Kingsley refused to sign the loyalty oath required by the patriots.

Between 1775 and 1779, when the Continentals were in control of Charleston, Kingsley was imprisoned three times for refusing to bear arms against the Crown. By 1780, the British had regained control of Charleston. Kingsley was appointed to a commission that helped promote loyalty to the British government.

By 1782 the revolutionaries had regained Charleston and Kingsley's sizeable property (consisting of several townhouses and thousands of acres in the surrounding countryside) was confiscated. He was also banished from South Carolina by the Assembly. On December 14, 1782 Kingsley temporarily left for England in one of the last of the 300 British evacuation ships that left Charleston.

== Canada ==
Back in Bristol, Kingsley obtained a new line of credit and in 1784 emigrated to Saint John in the newly created Colony of New Brunswick. There he sought, and obtained, land grants that the Crown gave to Loyalist refugees. He became a prominent businessman in the colony, owning many stores and importing his merchandise from Europe in his own ships. He also acquired townhouses in Saint John and Fredericton. By 1785, Kingsey was reunited with his family in New Brunswick.

Kingsley was very active in the social life of early New Brunswick. One of his ships (the True Briton) brought £500 in relief money from London that the London Quakers sent to assist needy Loyalist colonists.

On December 18, 1785, Kingsley and six other notable citizens petitioned Governor Thomas Carleton to establish "an academy or school of liberal arts and sciences at Fredericton". This eventually became Canada's oldest English language university, the University of New Brunswick.

To his Excellency Thomas Carleton Esquire Governor Captain General, and Commander in Chief, of the Province of New Brunswick, and the territories thereunto belonging, Vice Admiral Chancellor &c &c &c

Your memorialists whose names are hereunto subscribed, beg leave to represent, and state to your consideration the Necessity and expediency of an early attention to the Establishment in this Infant Province of an Academy, or School of liberal Arts and Sciences.

Your Excellency need not be reminded of the many Peculiarities attending the Settlement of this Country The Settlement of other Provinces has generally originated in the voluntary Exertions of a few enterprising Individuals, unincumbered, and prosecuting their Labor at their Leisure, and as they found it convenient, and most for their Advantage – Far different is the Situation in which the loyal Adventurers here find themselves – Many of them upon removing had Sons, whose Time of life, and former Hopes, call for an immediate attention to their Education – Many publick advantages, and many Conveniences would result to Individuals could this be affected within this Province, the Particulars of which it is unnecessary to ennumerate – Your Memorialists do therefore most earnestly request your Excellency will be pleased to grant a Charter for the establishing, and founding such an Academy ...

== Death ==
In 1791, the Kingsleys moved to Wilmington, North Carolina. Zephaniah Kingsley Sr. probably died a year later. His wife Isabella died in New York City on December 14, 1814, at age 77 and was buried at the Quakers' Houston Street Cemetery in Manhattan.
