= 2nd New York Heavy Artillery Regiment =

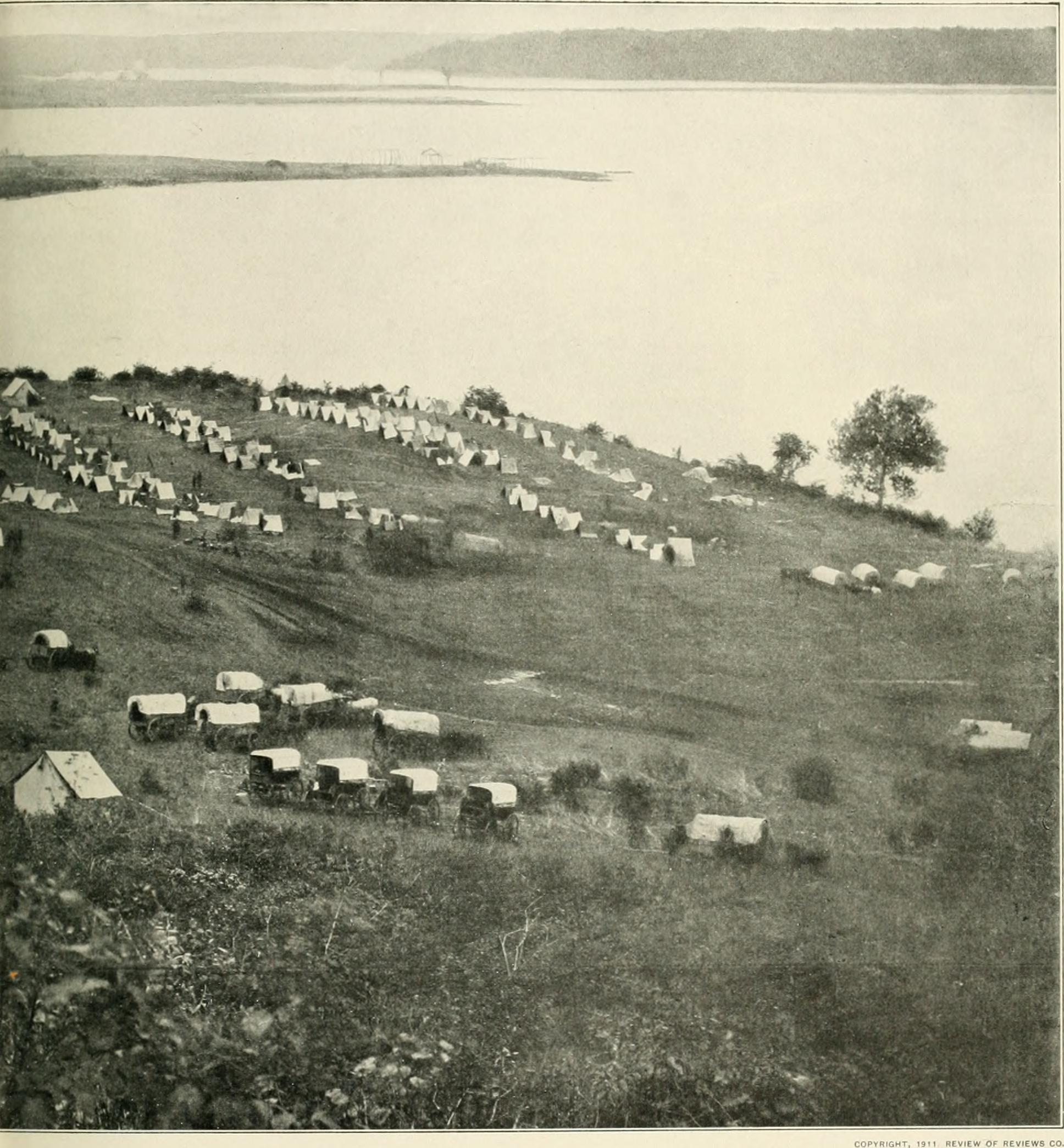
- 1st Massachusetts and 2nd New York on the way to Petersburg, camping at Belle Plain, May 16, 1864
- Active: August 23, 1861 – September 29, 1865
- Country: United States of America
- Allegiance: Union
- Branch: Heavy artillery & Infantry
- Engagements: Second Battle of Bull Run; Battle of Spotsylvania Court House; Battle of North Anna; Battle of Totopotomoy Creek; Battle of Cold Harbor; Siege of Petersburg; First Battle of Deep Bottom; Second Battle of Deep Bottom; Second Battle of Ream's Station; Battle of Boydton Plank Road; Appomattox Campaign; Battle of White Oak Road; Third Battle of Petersburg; Battle of Amelia Springs; Battle of Sailor's Creek; Battle of High Bridge; Battle of Appomattox Court House

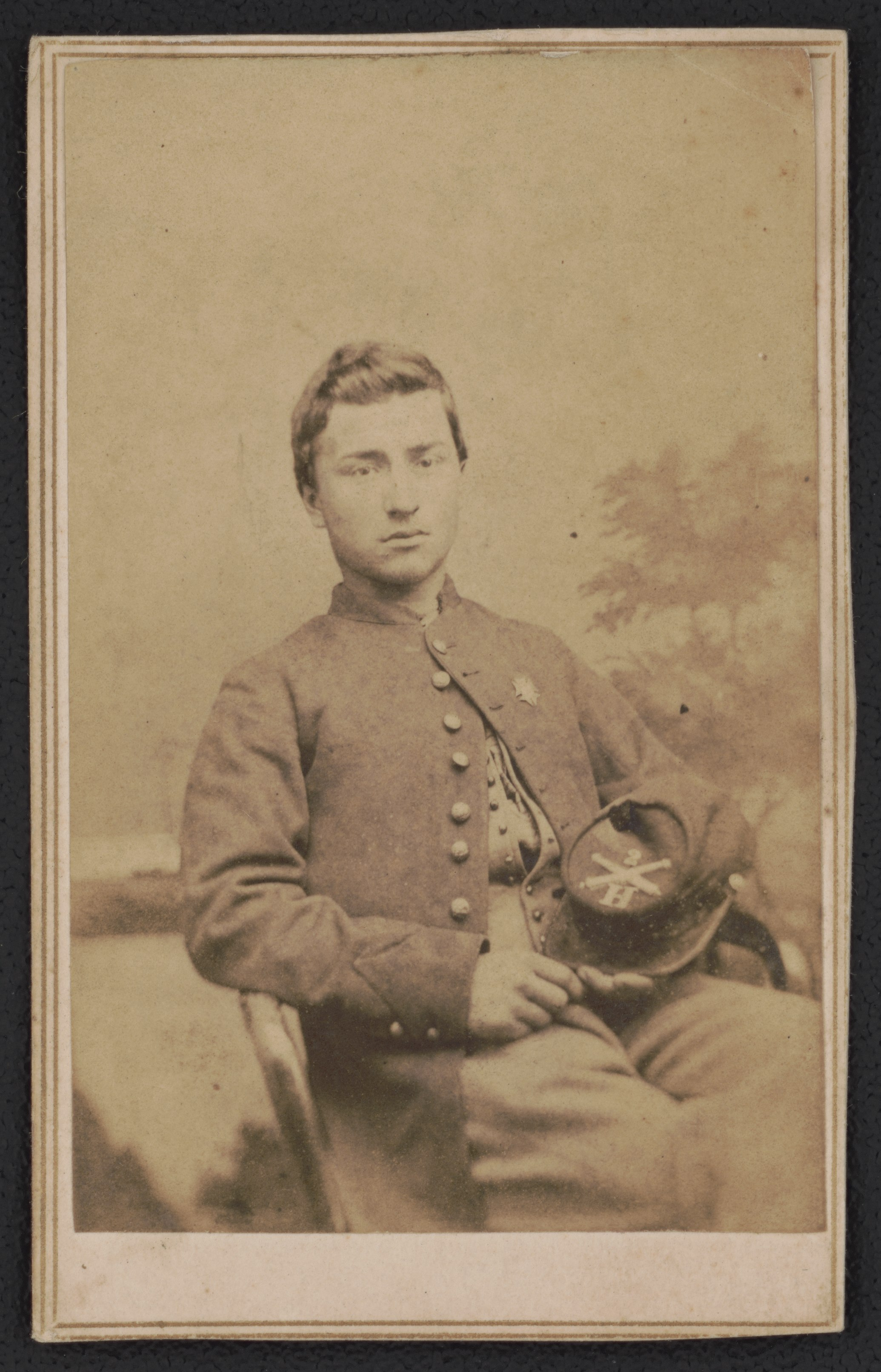
Private William Phelps McNeil of Co. H, 2nd New York Heavy Artillery Regiment. From the Liljenquist Family Collection of Civil War Photographs, Prints and Photographs Division, Library of Congress

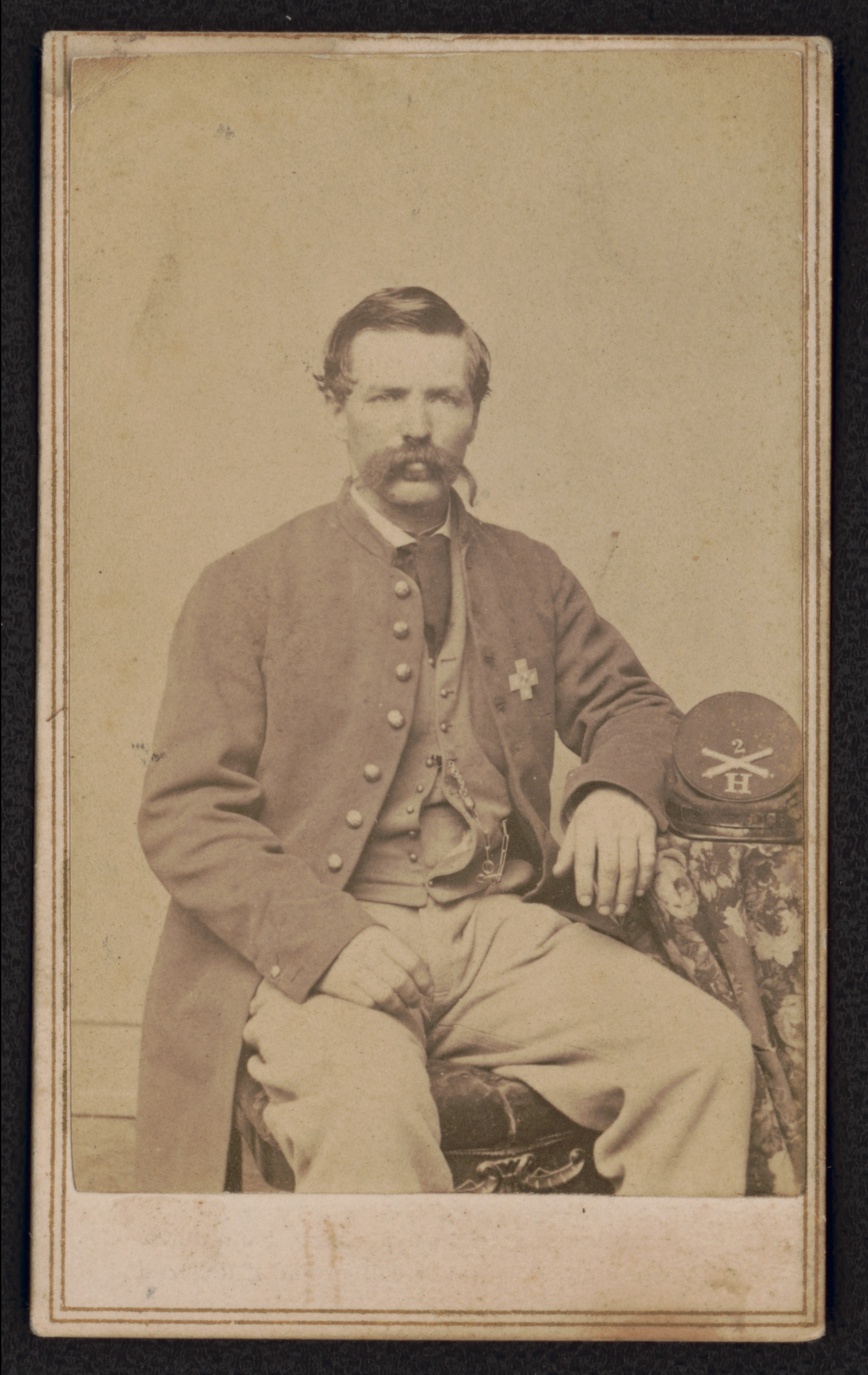
George W. Loveland of Co. H, 2nd New York Heavy Artillery Regiment

The 2nd New York Heavy Artillery Regiment was a heavy artillery regiment that served in the Union Army during the American Civil War. During the Siege of Petersburg the regiment operated as infantry.

== Service ==
The regiment was organized at Staten Island, New York and mustered in by individual batteries beginning August 23, 1861, for three years service.

Battery A – mustered in October 2, 1861
Battery B – mustered in August 23, 1861
Battery C – mustered in September 18, 1861
Battery D – mustered in September 18, 1861
Battery E – mustered in October 2, 1861
Battery F – mustered in October 15, 1861
Battery G – mustered in October 15, 1861
Battery H – mustered in October 15, 1861
Battery I – mustered in December 12, 1861
Battery K – mustered in December 12, 1861
Battery L – mustered in November 18, 1861
Battery M – mustered in December 12, 1861

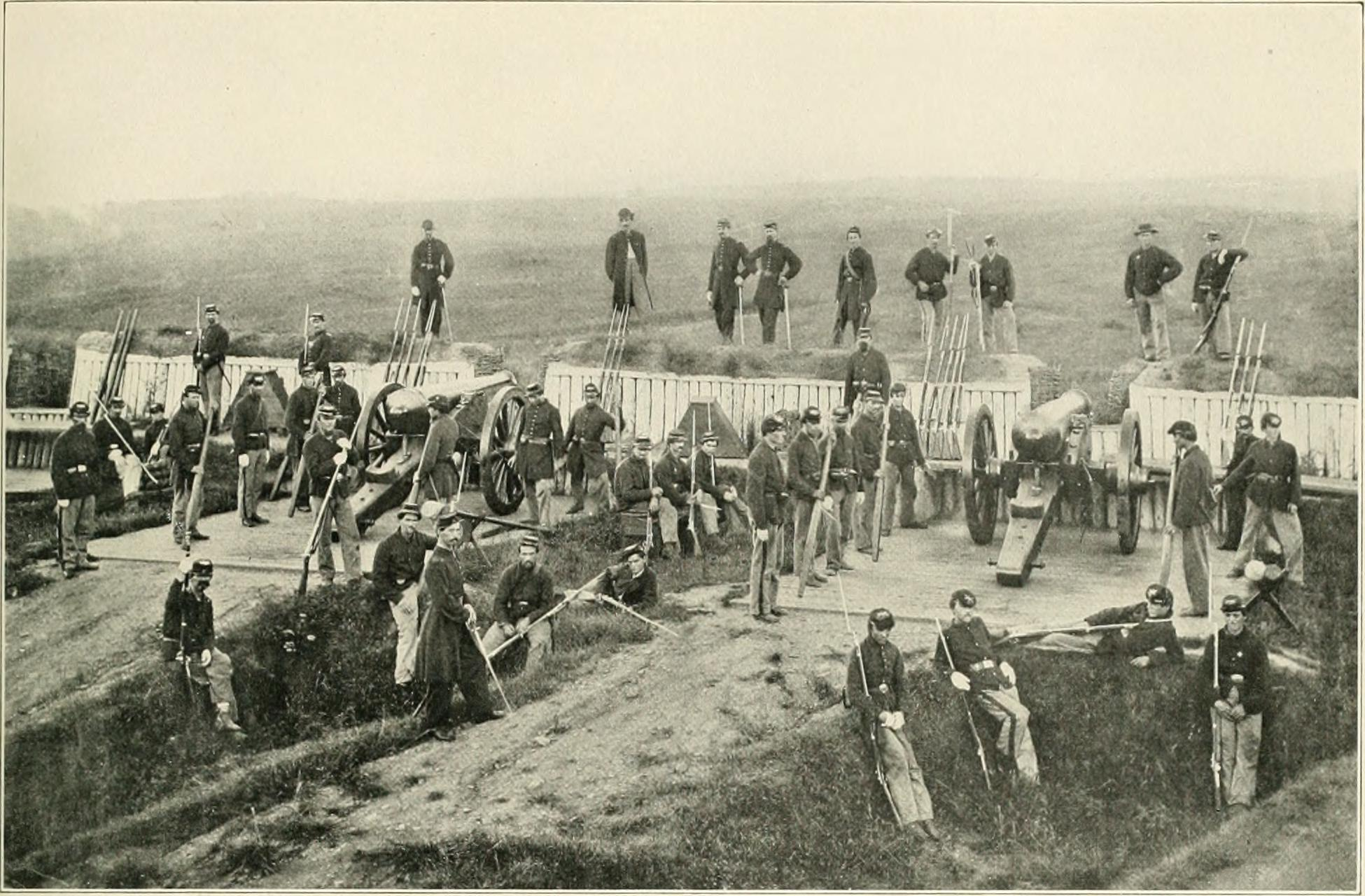
Battery L of the 2nd New York Heavy Artillery

On June 27, 1865, the regiment was consolidated into eight batteries. The men of Battery I were transferred to Batteries A & E. The men of Battery K were transferred to Batteries A, C, and F. The men of Battery L were transferred to Batteries B, C, D, and H. And the men of Battery M were transferred to Batteries A, G, and H.

The regiment was attached to Military District of Washington, D.C., December 1861 to May 1862. Sturgis' Command, Military District of Washington, to January 1863. Artillery, District of Alexandria, Virginia, to February 1863. Artillery, District of Alexandria, XXII Corps, Department of Washington, to April 1863. 1st Brigade, DeRussy's Division, XXII Corps, to April 1864. 2nd Brigade, DeRussy's Division, XXII Corps, to May 1864. Tyler's Heavy Artillery Division, II Corps, Army of the Potomac, May 16–29, 1864. 1st Brigade, 1st Division, II Corps, to June 1865. 1st Brigade, DeRussy's Division, XXII Corps, to September 1865.

The 2nd New York Heavy Artillery mustered out of the service at Washington, D.C., on September 29, 1865.

== Detailed service ==
Eight batteries left New York for Washington, D.C., November 7, 1861. Battery L left December 2 and Batteries I, K, and M left December 12, 1861. Duty in the Defenses of Washington until May 1864. Pope's Campaign in northern Virginia August 1862. Action at Bull Run Bridge, Virginia, August 27. Battle of Bull Run, Virginia, August 29–30. Ordered to join Army of the Potomac in the field May 15, 1864. Rapidan Campaign May – June. Spotsylvania Court House, Virginia, May 18–21. Harris Farm or Fredericksburg Road May 19. North Anna River May 23–26. On line of the Pamunkey May 26–28. Totopotomoy May 28–31. Cold Harbor June 1–12. Assault at Cold Harbor June 3. Before Petersburg June 16–18. Siege of Petersburg June 16, 1864, to April 2, 1865. Jerusalem Plank Road June 22–23, 1864. Deep Bottom July 27–28. Mine Explosion at Petersburg, July 30 (reserve). Deep Bottom, August 14–18. Ream's Station August 25. Boydton Plank Road, October 27–28. Reconnaissance to Hatcher's Run December 9–10. Hatcher's Run December 9. Dabney's Mills, Hatcher's Run, February 5–7, 1865. Watkins' House March 25. Appomattox Campaign March 28 – April 9. On line of Hatcher's and Gravelly Runs March 29–30. Hatcher's Run or Boydton Road March 31. White Oak Road March 31. Sutherland Station and fall of Petersburg April 2. Amelia Springs April 5. Sailor's Creek April 6. High Bridge and Farmville April 7. Appomattox Court House April 9. Surrender of Lee and his army. March to Washington, D.C., May 2–12. Grand Review of the Armies May 23. Duty at Washington, D.C., until September.

== Casualties ==
The regiment lost as a total of 461 men during service; 10 officers and 204 enlisted men killed or mortally wounded, 204 enlisted men died of disease.

== Commanders ==
- Colonel Joseph N. G. Whistler
- Colonel Milton Cogswell

== Notable members ==
- Private Thomas Davis, Company C – Medal of Honor recipient for action at the Battle of Sailor's Creek
- Sergeant Adam Worth, Company L – infamous criminal

== See also ==
- List of New York Civil War regiments
- New York in the American Civil War
