= John Whistler =

American Army officer (c. 1756–1829)

Coat of Arms of John Whistler

John Whistler (c. 1756 – 3 September 1829) was a soldier, born in County Londonderry, Ireland. He ran away from home as a boy, enlisted in the British army, and served as a colour sergeant under General John Burgoyne during the American Revolutionary War. After the surrender at Saratoga, John returned to England and was honorably discharged. Soon afterward, he eloped with Anna, a daughter of Sir Edward Bishop. They emigrated to the United States, and settled at Hagerstown, Maryland.

Shortly afterward, John entered the United States Army, and was sent to the Western frontier. He was sent on the Harmar Campaign of 1790, and was severely wounded in St. Clair's Defeat of 1791. He was a Lieutenant in the Legion of the United States, and helped build the United States forts in Fort Wayne. He commanded in succession, Fort St. Mary's (1795 – ), Fort Wayne, and Fort Dearborn. He was promoted to Captain on 1 July 1797 and transferred to Fort Lernoult in Detroit. In Summer 1803, he was sent with his company of the 1st Infantry from Fort Detroit to Lake Michigan, where he completed Fort Dearborn before the close of the year, on the site of the future city of Chicago. He served as the first commandant of the new fort.

Captain Whistler was recalled to Detroit in 1810. During the War of 1812, he was breveted to Major, and served with his company until the end of the war in 1815. After the war, he was appointed military store-keeper at Newport, Kentucky. In 1816, he was sent to Fort Wayne where he built the third fort there; having helped design the first two. In 1817 he moved to St. Charles, Missouri, and was the military storekeeper at Jefferson Barracks, near St. Louis, Missouri, a position he held until his death at Fort Bellefontaine in 1829.

His ancestor Ralph Whistler was the chief tenant of the Salters' Company Plantation of Ulster grant centred of Magherafelt, County Londonderry, from 1627 to 1635.

== Legacy ==
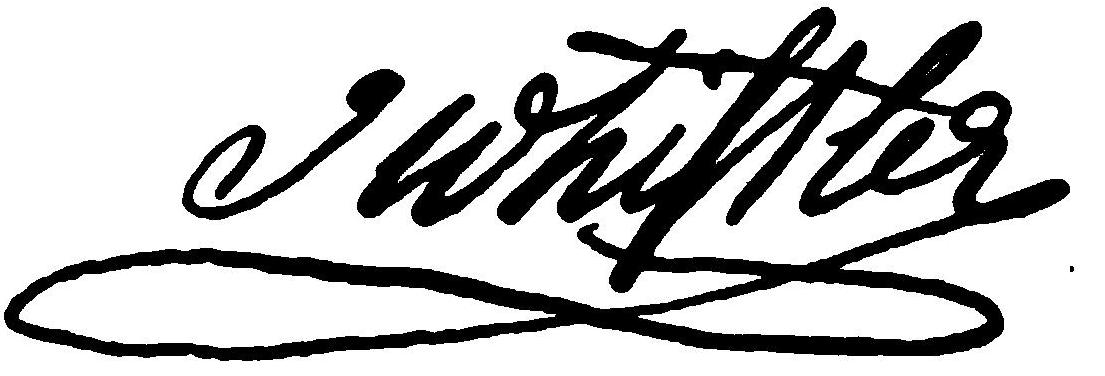
Signature of John Whistler.

John and Anna Whistler had fifteen children. Three of their sons became United States Army officers: John, Colonel William Whistler (a commissioned officer from 1801 to 1861) and Lt. George Washington Whistler, a railroad designer in America and Russia.

Two of John Whistler's grandchildren were officers during the American Civil War: Union Brigadier-General Joseph N. G. Whistler and Colonel Joseph Nelson Garland Whistler. Another grandson, the future painter James Abbott McNeill Whistler, attended West Point in 1851, but did not graduate.

John Whistler Elementary School in Chicago, Illinois, is named for John Whistler.
