= Sergiusz Piasecki =

Russian-born Polish-British writer

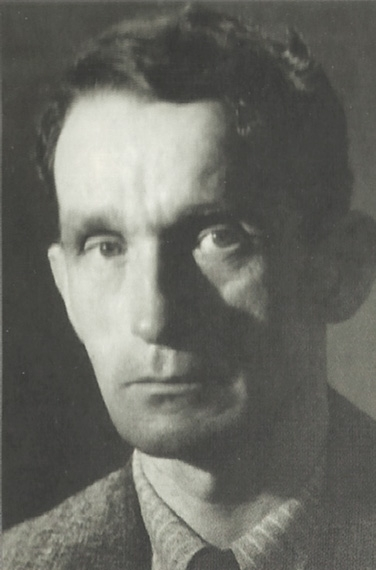
- Piasecki (before 1939)
- Born: 1 April 1901 (or 1 June 1899); Lachowicze, Minsk Governorate, Russian Empire (now Lyakhavichy, Belarus)
- Died: 12 September 1964 (aged either 63 or 65); London, UK
- Resting place: Hastings Cemetery, Powązki Cemetery, Poland (since 29 Sep, 2025)
- Occupations: Writer, spy, army officer, soldier, smuggler
- Writing career
- Genres: Novel, short story
- Subjects: Criminal underworld, smuggle, espionage, Soviet Union, Polish Underground State
- Notable works: Kochanek Wielkiej Niedzwiedzicy, Wieża Babel, Zapiski oficera Armii Czerwonej
- Movements: Modernism, magic realism

Sergiusz Piasecki (Belarusian: Сяргей Пясецкі, romanized: Siarhiej Piasiecki, Polish pronunciation: [ˈsɛrɡʲuʂ pjaˈsɛt͡skʲi]; 1 April 1901 (or 1 June 1899) in Lachowicze near Baranowicze – 12 September 1964 in Penley, London) was a Polish writer of the 20th century. His novel written in prison, Lover of the Great Bear, published in 1937, was the third most popular novel in the Second Polish Republic. Following World War II, Piasecki's books were banned by Communist censorship in the People's Republic of Poland. After the collapse of the Soviet Union, in early 1990s, Lover of the Great Bear became again one of the best selling books in the country according to Rzeczpospolita daily newspaper. His other novel, an Anti-Soviet satire The Memoirs of a Red Army Officer, had been reprinted several times.

== Biography ==
=== Early life ===
Sergiusz Piasecki was born on 1 April 1901 (or 1 June 1899), the illegitimate son of a postmaster (Michał Piasecki) and a servant (Klaudia Kukałowicz) in Lachowicze, 130 km from Minsk, then in Northwestern Krai of the Russian Empire (now Brest Province, Belarus). The latter date was presented by Piasecki on several occasions, in order to mislead the authorities.

His childhood was difficult because children at school mocked his Polish roots, calling him "Lach". Piasecki hated the Russian school – as he later explained – and in the seventh grade, armed with a pistol attacked the teacher. Sentenced to jail, he escaped from prison, and headed to Moscow, where he experienced the October Revolution and watched his close friends' deaths. In 1919 he traveled to Minsk, as a member of the Belarusian "White" organisation. He cooperated with Polish army that was entering Minsk at that time, getting himself wounded.

From 7 April 1920 to 10 January 1921, he studied in army officers school Infantry Officer Cadet School in Warsaw. Later he took part in Polish–Soviet War of 1920. He was demobilised on 12 May 1921. Afterwards, he was asked to join Polish intelligence, as his language skills (he spoke Russian and Belarusian fluently) were highly regarded.

=== Ambiguities ===
In the monograph about his life, work and legend, researcher Krzysztof Polechoński noted that most available data about Piasecki's whereabouts often do not correspond to reality, not to mention the claims made by the writer himself. Perhaps the discrepancies came from his work as intelligence agent, but there is no way to confirm many of his personal stories. Piasecki's addresses in Vilnius are not available and neither are the registers of houses in which he lived. His personal documents in possession of Piasecki's son: such as the copy of a marriage certificate with Jadwiga Waszkiewicz or the birth certificate of his son Władysław Tomaszewicz are falsifications, as revealed by Polechoński himself after a search performed in Vilnius archives. It is not possible to say whether his evacuation card is authentic. There is no photo of him in the prisoners' photo archives of Łukiszki penitentiary. There is no proof of his residency amongst the Vilnius city dwellers. He might have stayed in a hotel.

=== Work for the Polish intelligence service ===
In early 1920s, Piasecki organized a whole web of Polish agents, covering the area of Soviet Belarus. Piasecki was also a smuggler, in order to both earn the money to finance his activities but also to have a cover up for them. Foreign spies as a rule were all executed by the Soviets, while smugglers were only incarcerated for a few years. As he wrote – he smuggled cocaine to the USSR, taking furs back to Poland.

During this period, he served 21 months in Novogrudok prison for his involvement in a clash between two smuggling gangs. This situation repeated again in 1926, Piasecki was again imprisoned and expelled from service. After his release from prison, he tried to interest French intelligence in his services and to leave for the Foreign Legion. After these plans failed, he took up robbery. He was arrested again and sentenced to death by a verdict of the Vilnius Field Court on January 9, 1930. His former supervisors from the intelligence have sought a reduced fine, and so instead of being executed, Piasecki ended up with 15 years imprisonment. His stay in the Lida prison was short. As a leader of a rebellion, he was moved to Rawicz. There, he incited another riot, and was moved to Koronowo and later to Wronki. Finally, Piasecki was transferred to the hardest prison in Poland, located in Łysa Góra near Kielce. As he was regarded a troublesome prisoner, he was often kept in isolation ward, where he got sick with tuberculosis.

=== Writing in prison ===
Piasecki became a writer by chance. Later, he confessed that many prisoners in Wronki would write, so he decided to emulate them. As his knowledge of standard Polish was poor, he would learn from a school book of Polish grammar. Some time in either 1935 or 1936, his prison prose came to the attention of a famous novelist and journalist, Melchior Wańkowicz, who toured Polish prisons as a reporter. After reading a manuscript of Kochanek Wielkiej Niedzwiedzicy, Wańkowicz encouraged Piasecki to continue his writing efforts and helped him to publish the book. The publication and resulting popularity of the book became the catalyst for getting Piasecki out of prison. The book was published while Piasecki was still in prison, and its copy was delivered to his cell. The book sold out within a month, it was the third most popular publication of interwar Poland.

Due to popularity of the book, Wańkowicz's efforts to release Piasecki were supported by other writers and lawyers. Finally, in 1937 president Ignacy Mościcki pardoned him. The day of his release was sensational, crowds of journalists were waiting at a gate, and Piasecki himself was shocked at technical novelties, such as radio, which had become common since 1926. In late 1937 and early 1938, Piasecki went to Otwock and Zakopane, to recuperate. Among others, he met Witkacy, who painted his portrait. Being a celebrity, he avoided meeting with numerous readers, neither did he like signing of books.

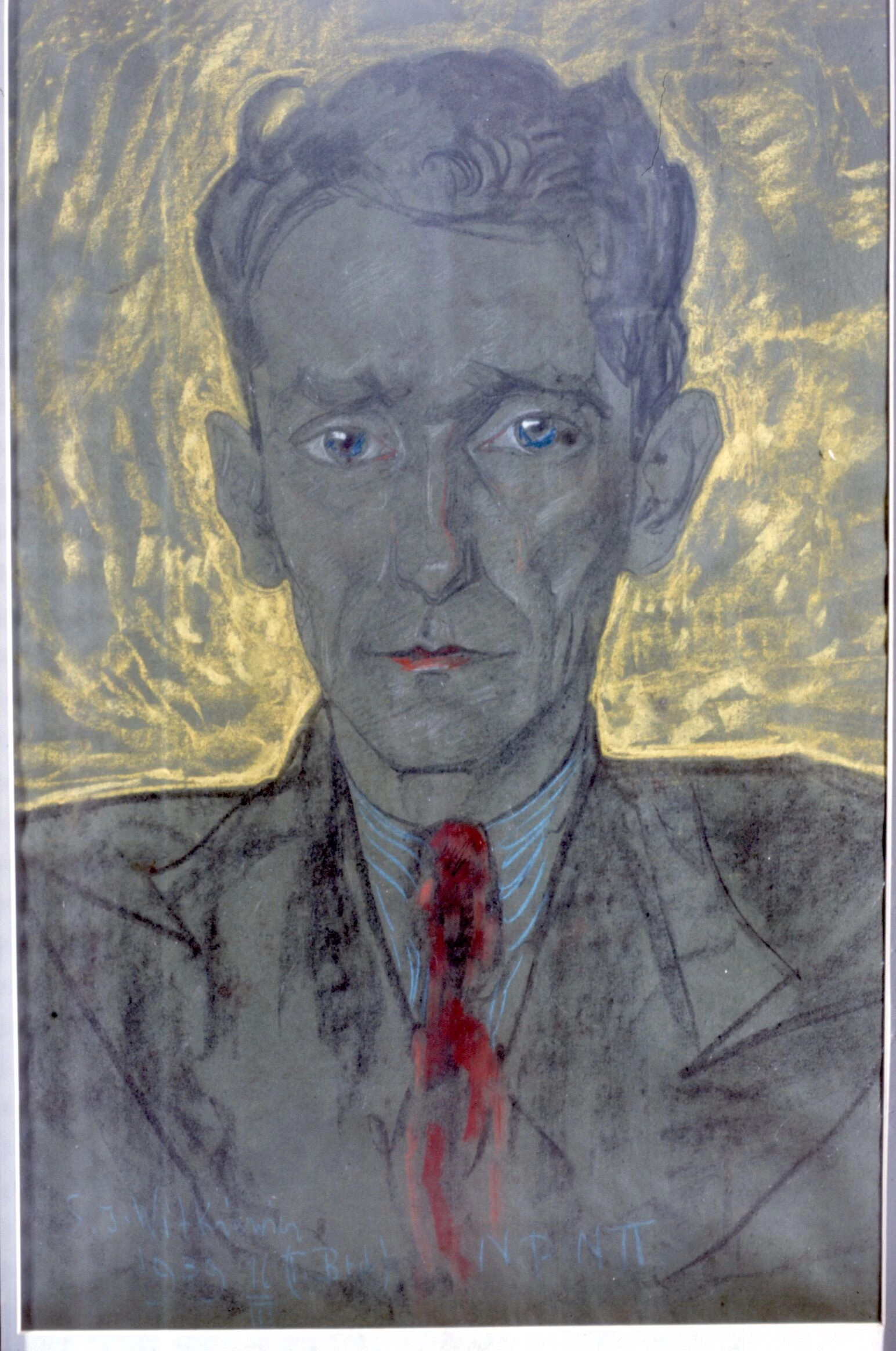
Portrait of Sergiusz Piasecki by Witkacy

=== World War II activities ===
In the summer of 1939 Piasecki went to Wilno where he stayed during the invasion of Poland in World War II. In September 1939, he volunteered to the Border Defence Corps, to fight the Soviets. During the occupation of Poland, he was offered a chance to move to France, but refused and decided to stay in his occupied homeland. Even though he had never been a member of the Home Army (he said he worked for its executive branch No 2, which – like many of his stories – was never confirmed), he had cooperated with the Polish resistance, and in 1943 became an executioner, carrying out capital punishment sentences handed down by underground Polish courts. His wartime noms de guerre were "Sucz", "Kira" and "Konrad". Later, he wrote two books about his war activities. These are Wieża Babel (The Tower of Babel) and Adam i Ewa (Adam and Eve). Among those who he was ordered to execute, was Józef Mackiewicz, falsely accused of cooperating with the Germans. However, Piasecki refused to kill him, and later it was revealed that Mackiewicz's accusations had been made up by the Soviets.

=== Living in exile ===
After the war, Piasecki hid from the secret police for a year inside Poland. In April 1946, he escaped to Italy, where he spotted the Italian translation of his own Kochanek Wielkiej Niedzwiedzicy. Soon, he got in touch with Polish writers living in exile, including Jerzy Giedroyc. In 1947, Piasecki moved to England, his name can be found on a resolution of Union of Polish Writers in Exile, which urged all concerned to stop publishing in the Communist-occupied country. He once publicly declared that he would gladly take any job that would result in erasing Communism. Living abroad, Piasecki did not stop writing. In the late 1940s he came to the conclusion that humor was the best weapon to fight the Communists. So, he wrote a satire The memoirs of a Red Army officer, which presents a made-up diary of Mishka Zubov - an officer of the Red Army, who, together with his unit enters Poland on 17 September 1939. Zubov claims in his "diary" that his only purpose is to kill all the bourgeoisie who possess watches and bicycles. Piasecki became fluent in English as an adult. Sergiusz Piasecki died in 1964 in London at the age of 65. On his tomb, located in Hastings Cemetery, England, it is said that he was born on 1 June 1899.

On September 29, 2025, with the participation of the President of Poland, Karol Nawrocki, his remains were brought back to Poland, and his ceremonial funeral took place at Powązki Cemetery in Warsaw.

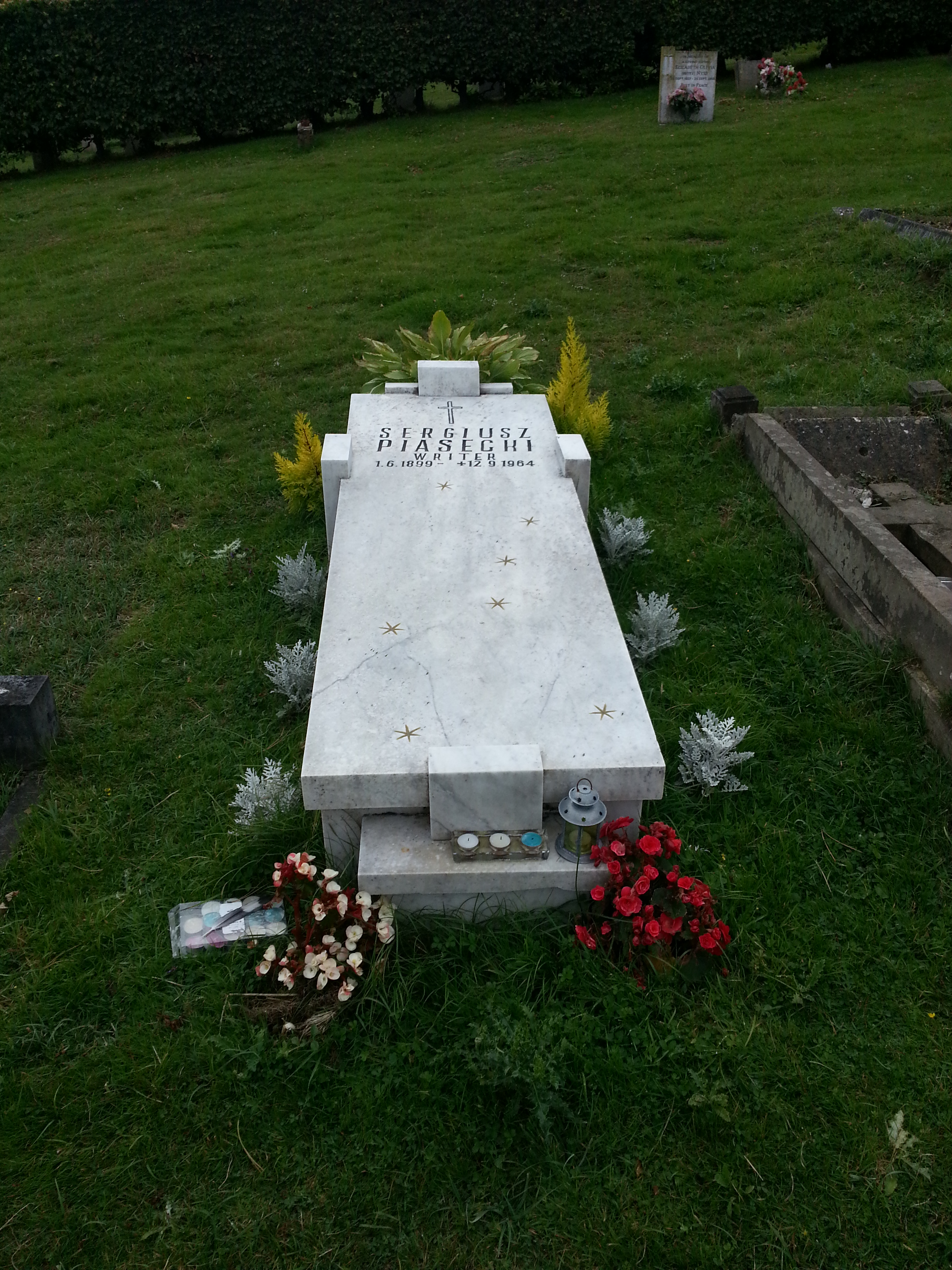
Sergiusz Piasecki's grave - Hastings Cemetery

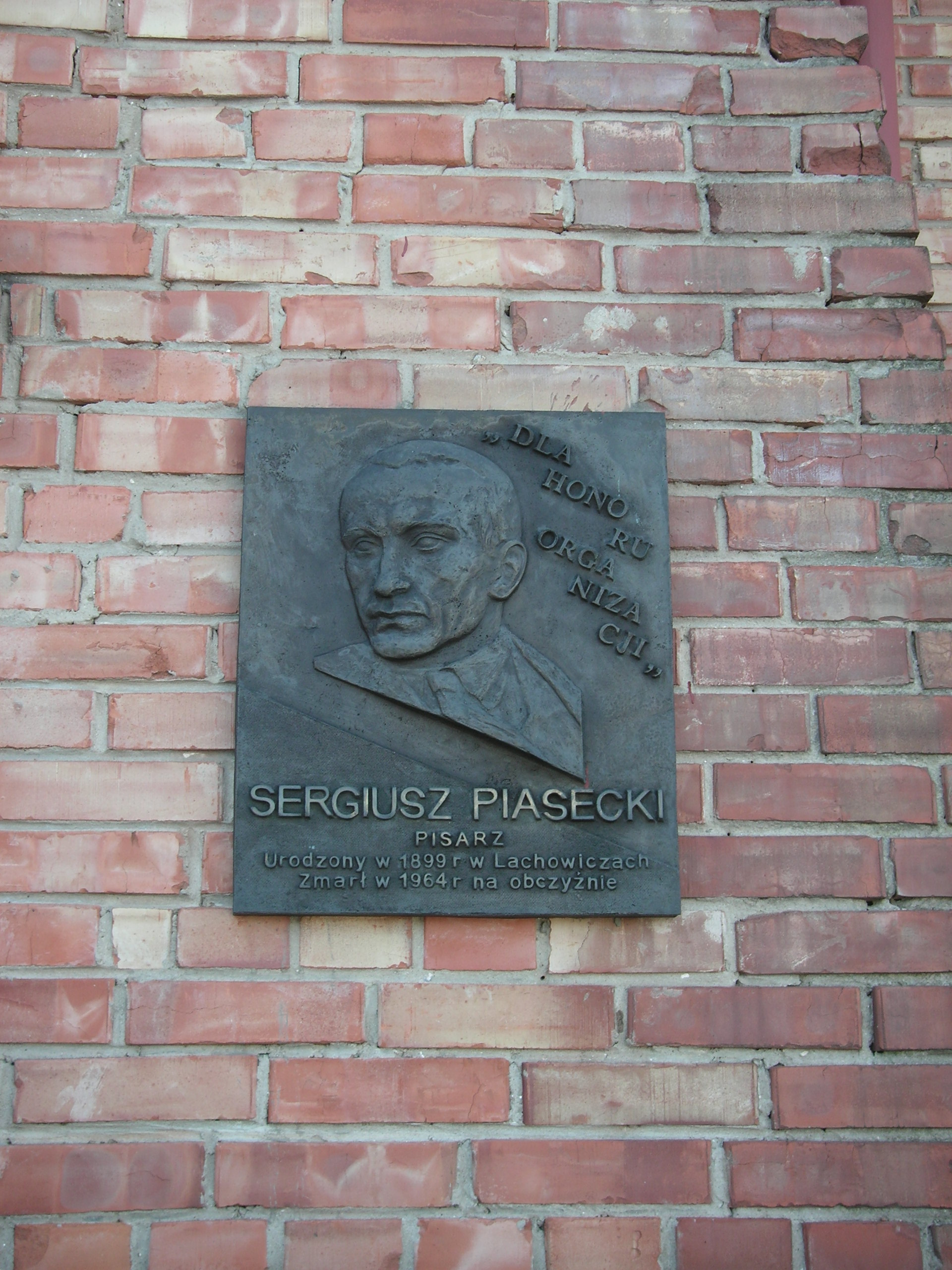
Sergiusz Piasecki commemorative plaque

== Bibliography ==
- The Fifth Stage (Piąty Etap) - autobiographical novel about work of a spy on Polish - Soviet frontier. Written in prison in April 1934. Published for the first time by Towarzystwo Wydawnicze „Rój" in 1938.
- Lover of the Great Bear (Kochanek Wielkiej Niedźwiedzicy) - action novel, describing life of smugglers on Polish-Soviet frontier. Written in prison in April 1935. Published for the first time by Towarzystwo Wydawnicze „Rój" in 1939. Translated to English by John Mann and published by George Routledge & Sons, LTD in 1938.
- Red haired Ewa (Ruda Ewa) - short story written in prison in 1936.
- Road to a wall (Drogą pod mur) - autobiography of his childhood written in jail in may 1937.
- Night's Gods' Equals (Bogom Nocy Równi) - sequel to the Fifth Stage. 1938 Towarzystwo Wydawnicze „Rój". 1989 Towarzystwo Wydawnicze „Graf”.
- One Hundred Questions addressed to the 'nowadays' Warsaw (Sto pytań pod adresem „obecnej” Warszawy) - political memorial. Written in 1946, published in 1947, Rome.
- Thief's Trilogy (Trylogia Złodziejska) - series of three books portraying life of criminal underworld in Minsk. Each takes place under different authorities: Polish, Nazi German and Soviet. All book titles are based on popular songs, first two being criminals and prison songs. The last title is a phrase taken from The Internationale. Published in Rome by Instytut Literacki.
  - Apple (Jabłuszko) - 1946.
  - I will look in a window (Spojrze ja w okno) - 1947.
  - There are no supreme saviours (Nikt nie da nam zbawienia) - 1947.
- Lucifer's Seven Pills (7 Pigułek Lucyfera) - grotesque satire about first years of Polish People's Republic after the war. (London, 1948)
- Shreds of Legend (Strzęp Legendy) - short story about Nazi German occupation of Poland (London, 1949)
- The Memoirs of a Red Army Officer (Zapiski Oficera Armii Czerwonej) - satire about Soviet occupation of Wilno and Lida, seen from perspective of indoctrinated Russian soldier. (London, Gryf Publications LTD 1957).
- The Life of a Disarmed Man - story of a demobilised veteran of the 1920 Polish–Soviet War (London, B. Świderski 1962; first version written in jail in 1935).
- Adam and Ewa (Adam i Ewa) - story of a difficult love of two people during the war of 1939 in Vilnius Region (Wileńszczyźna) (published in chapters in a newspaper, 1963)
- Babel Tower (Wieża Babel) - Polish Underground State and anti-Nazi German conspiracy during Second World War in Vilnius Region. (London, Polska Fundacja Kulturalna 1964)
  - A Man Turned into a Wolf (Człowiek Przemieniony w Wilka) - conspiracy in years 1939 to 1942.
  - For Honour of the Organisation (Dla honoru Organizacji) - Home Army execution squad activity 1942 to 1943.
  - Soon before his death, Sergiusz Piasecki started working on the last chapter which would conclude the series with years 1943 to 1945.

== See also ==
- Polish literature
