= Samuel Heywood (chief justice) =

Personal details
- Born: 8 October 1753 Liverpool, Lancashire
- Died: 11 September 1828 (aged 74) Tenby, Pembrokeshire, Wales
- Spouse: Susannah Cornwall (m. 1781–1828)
- Children: Phoebe Augusta Heywood; Edward Heywood; Susannah Maria Heywood; Sophia Heywood; Anne Heywood; Mary Isabella Heywood
- Education: Warrington Academy; Trinity Hall, Cambridge
- Occupation: Serjeant-at-law; Chief Justice of the Carmarthen Circuit of Wales

Samuel Heywood (1753–1828) was an English serjeant-at-law and a Chief Justice of the Carmarthen Circuit of Wales.

== Life ==
Heywood was born in Liverpool, Lancashire to Benjamin and Phoebe Heywood, née Ogden. He was educated at Warrington Academy, and Trinity Hall, Cambridge, though as a Unitarian did not attend college chapel, and could not graduate as he would not subscribe to the Church of England's 39 Articles. He studied law at the Inner Temple, rising to prominence as a lawyer and barrister. He was called to the Bar in 1778. Based at Lancaster, Lancashire, he was appointed Serjeant-at-Law (1795) and also Chief Justice of the Carmarthen Circuit of Wales (1807). He was one of very few religious dissenters holding a national public office at this time. He was a fierce opponent of the high church aspects of Anglicanism.

== Family and death ==
He married Susannah Cornwall (died 19 January 1822) on 1 January 1781 at St Bride's Church, Fleet Street, London. They had at least one son and five daughters:

1. Phoebe Augusta Heywood (1 December 1781 - 12 June 1832)
2. Edward Heywood (bapt 14 December 1782)
3. Susannah Maria Heywood (bapt 13 Feb 1784)
4. Sophia Heywood (bapt 16 March 1785)
5. Anne Heywood (24 May 1791 – 17 October 1857), who married 6 January 1815 to Lieutenant-General William Granville Eliot, a son of Francis Perceval Eliot.
6. Mary Isabella Heywood (bapt 16 January 1795)

On 29 August 1828, during one of his Welsh circuits, Heywood was seized with paralysis at Haverfordwest, Pembrokeshire and died on 11 September at nearby Tenby. His law library was sold at auction by R. H. Evans in London on 31 October 1829 (along with the books of Rev. P. W. Buckham). A copy of the catalogue is held at Cambridge University Library (shelfmark Munby.c.137(3)).

== Publications ==
- The Right of Protestant Dissenters to a Compleat Toleration Asserted (1787) pseudonymously as "A Layman"
- Digest of the Law Respecting County Elections (1790)
