= Joseph N. G. Whistler =

Joseph Nelson Garland Whistler
- Born: October 19, 1822; Green Bay, Wisconsin
- Died: April 20, 1899 (aged 76); Fort Wadsworth, New York
- Burial place: Vale Cemetery, Schenectady, New York
- Military career
- Allegiance: United States
- Branch: United States Army
- Service years: 1846–1886
- Rank: Colonel (US Army); Brevet brigadier general (United States Volunteers)
- Conflicts: Mexican–American War; American Indian Wars; American Civil War

Joseph Nelson Garland Whistler (October 19, 1822 – April 20, 1899) was a career United States Army officer. He served in the Mexican–American War and received a brevet appointment for distinguished service in the Battle of Contreras and the Battle of Churubusco. At the beginning of the American Civil War, Whistler was among the U.S. Regular Army officers taken prisoner by Confederates in Texas in April 1861 and paroled but was not exchanged until August 15, 1862. In 1863, he became colonel of the 2nd New York Heavy Artillery Regiment. He received a promotion and four brevet appointments in the regular army for his service during the Overland Campaign, specifically the Battle of North Anna, and the Siege of Petersburg, specifically the Second Battle of Petersburg. He was nominated on January 13, 1866 and confirmed on March 12, 1866 for appointment to the grade of brevet brigadier general of volunteers, to rank from March 13, 1866. He retired in on October 19, 1886 as colonel of the 15th U.S. Infantry Regiment.

== Early life ==
Joseph Nelson Garland Whistler was born at Green Bay, Wisconsin on October 19, 1822.

He was the grandson of John Whistler, an Irish-born soldier who served under General Burgoyne during the Revolutionary War and was captured at the Battle of Saratoga. His father was Colonel William Whistler who served in the Army for 60 years. His first cousin was the famous artist James Abbott McNeill Whistler.

Whistler was a cadet at the United States Military Academy from September 1, 1842 to July 1, 1846, when he was graduated and promoted in the Army to brevet second lieutenant in the 8th Infantry on July 1, 1846. He was promoted to second lieutenant, 3d Infantry on January 7, 1847.

== Mexican–American War ==
Whistler served in the Mexican–American War, from 1846 to 1848, being engaged in the Siege of Veracruz, March 9 to 29, 1847, the Battle of Cerro Gordo, April 17‑18, 1847, the Battle of Contreras, August 19–20, 1847, the Battle of Churubusco, August 20, 1847. He was appointed brevet first lieutenant on August 20, 1847 for "Gallant and Meritorious Conduct" in the Battles of Contreras and Churubusco, Mexico.

He fought in the Battle of Chapultepec, September 13, 1847, and participated in the Battle for Mexico City on September 13 to 14, 1847.

== Assignments: 1848–1861 ==
Whistler was in garrison at East Pascagoula, Mississippi, 1848 and on frontier duty at San Elizario, Texas from 1849‑1850. He served at Fort Bliss, Texas in 1850, convoying wagon trains.

Later, he was stationed in the area of New Mexico for about a decade where he fought in skirmishes against the Apache and Navajo. His postings included Cebolleta, New Mexico, 1850‑51, in Navajo Country, 1851, and at Fort Defiance, New Mexico, 1851–53. He was promoted to first lieutenant, 3rd U.S. Infantry Regiment on June 6, 1852.

He served at Fort Craig, New Mexico from 1854–56. He was on recruiting service, during 1856–58. Then, he was on frontier duty at Los Lunas, New Mexico, 1858–60, Fort Fillmore, New Mexico, 1860, Fort McIntosh, Texas, 1860–61, Mouth of the Rio Grande, 1861, and Indianola, Texas, 1861.

== American Civil War ==
On April 21, 1861, Whistler was captured by Texas troops at Indianola, Texas (or at nearby Lavaca, Texas) at the start of the American Civil War and was paroled as a prisoner of war. Thereafter, he was in garrison at Fort Hamilton, New York, 1861.

Whistler was promoted to captain in the 3rd U.S. Infantry Regiment on May 14, 1861. He was assigned to the United States Military Academy at West Point, New York as assistant instructor of infantry tactics on September 25, 1861 and served there until March 20, 1863. He was exchanged, and then able to serve in combat, on August 15, 1862.

Whistler was then reassigned as Commissary of Musters for the Department of Virginia, April to May, 1863. He was commissioned as colonel, 2nd New York Heavy Artillery Regiment on May 6, 1863 and served in the Defenses of Washington, D.C. from May 6, 1863 to May 15, 1864. He was in the Overland Campaign of the Army of the Potomac, from May to June, 1864, being engaged in the Battle of Spotsylvania Court House between May 18 and 20, 1864 and the Battle of North Anna between May 21 and 25, 1864. He was appointed brevet major in the regular army to rank from May 24, 1864, for "Gallant and Meritorious Services at the Battle of North Anna, Virginia".

He was then engaged in the Battle of Totopotomoy Creek, May 28–29, 1864, Battle of Cold Harbor, June 1–3, 1864, the assaults on Petersburg, June 16 and 18, 1864, and the Siege of Petersburg, June 19, 1864, where he was wounded and granted a sick leave of absence for being disabled by his wound from June to July, 1864. He was appointed brevet lieutenant colonel to rank from June 19, 1864, for "Gallant and Meritorious Services in Front of Petersburg, Virginia."

Whistler was in command of a brigade in the Defenses of Washington, D.C. from July, 1864 to September 19, 1865, being engaged in the defense of the Capital during the Battle of Fort Stevens, July 11–12, 1864, against the Army of the Valley, principally the detached Second Corps, Army of Northern Virginia, under the command of (temporary) Lieutenant General Jubal Early. Whistler was severely wounded at the Siege of Petersburg He was promoted to major of the 13th U.S. Infantry Regiment on December 31, 1864. Whistler received an appointment as brevet colonel to rank from March 13, 1865, for "Gallant and Meritorious Services during the Rebellion."

Whistler was an Original Companion of the Military Order of the Loyal Legion of the United States, a military society for Union officers who served in the American Civil War. Whistler was on a leave of absence, October 17 to November 16, 1865. He was mustered out of volunteer service on September 29, 1865 according to Eicher or on December 19, 1865 according to Cullum's Register.

On January 13, 1866, President Andrew Johnson nominated Whistler for appointment to the grade of brevet brigadier general of volunteers, to rank from March 13, 1865, and the United States Senate confirmed the appointment on March 12, 1866.

== Later military life ==
Whistler was in command of the 3d Battalion, 13th U.S. Infantry Regiment, at Jefferson Barracks, Missouri, November, 1865, to April, 1866. He was transferred to 31st U.S. Infantry Regiment on September 21, 1866.

Whistler served on frontier duty at Fort Rice, Dakota, January 1866, to July, 1867; in command of Fort Totten, North Dakota, to July, 1869; Fort Randall, Dakota, July, 1869 to September, 1870; and Fort Sully (South Dakota), September 24, 1870 to October 25, 1872. He commanded the escort to Northern Pacific Railroad Survey (1871 Yellowstone Surveying Expedition), August 28 to October 25, 1871.

He was on leave of absence to January 12, 1873; in garrison at Newport Barracks, Kentucky, January 12, 1873 to October 27, 1874, being in command from November 10, 1873. He was promoted to lieutenant colonel, 5th U.S. Infantry Regiment, February 18, 1874.

Whistler was on frontier duty in command of Fort Ripley, Kansas, on November 6, 1874, to August 9, 1876, and of Camp on Tongue River, Montana, August 28 to December 30, 1876; on detached service at St. Paul, Minnesota to January 29, 1877; on leave of absence to December 1, 1877; and in command of Fort Snelling, Minnesota, December 29, 1877, to May 21, 1878, and Fort Keogh, Montana, June 5, 1878, to June 23, 1879; on duty at Poplar Creek Agency, Montana, to August 28, 1879; in command of Fort Keogh, Montana, to September 15, 1879; at headquarters, Department of Dakota, St. Paul, Minnesota, to October 18, 1879; on sick leave of absence, to May 10, 1880; in command of Fort Keogh, Montana, to May 30, 1881; on court martial duty to July 8, 1881; in command of Fort Keogh (of regiment to November 8, 1882) to July 10, 1883.

Whistler was promoted to colonel of the 15th U.S. Infantry Regiment on May 31, 1883 and was on sick leave of absence until October 16, 1883; and in command of regiment and post of Fort Buford, Dakota, to October 19, 1886.

== Later life ==
Whistler retired from active service on October 19, 1886, having reached the mandatory retirement age of 64.

Joseph Nelson Garland Whistler died on April 20, 1899, at Fort Wadsworth, New York, aged 77. He was buried at Vale Cemetery, Schenectady, New York.

== See also ==
- List of American Civil War brevet generals (Union)
