= Francis Perceval Eliot =

Military officer, auditor, man of letters

- with permission from The Eliot Sisters Collection
- Born: September 1755; Kew Green, Surrey, England
- Died: 23 August 1818 (aged 62); 22 Portman Street, London, England
- Burial place: St Marylebone, London
- Spouse: Anne Breynton (m. 1778–1818)
- Military career
- Allegiance: Great Britain; United Kingdom
- Service years: 1773–1806
- Rank: Colonel
- Commands: 14th Regiment of Foot; Staffordshire Yeomanry Cavalry; 3rd Staffordshire Militia; 2nd Staffordshire Militia
- Other work: Auditor; Man of letters

Francis Perceval Eliot (September 1755 – 23 August 1818) was an English soldier, auditor, and man of letters. In 1814 he succeeded his half-brother as Count Eliot, however he did not feel it was proper to assume the title.

== Life ==
Eliot was the son of General Granville Elliott (1713–1759) and his second wife, Elizabeth Duckett (1724–1804). He was born at Kew Green, Richmond-upon-Thames, Surrey, and baptised on 9 October 1755 at St Anne's Church, Kew Green.

Following his father's death on 10 October 1759, the family moved on 15 April 1760 to Richmond. In 1762, Francis lodged at Hargreaves in St Martin's Lane, London. On 17 April 1764, he lodged with Mrs Bathurst, Charterhouse Square and attended the public school of St Bartholomew. In 1770, he went to Mrs Betesworth's Academy in Kingston, near Portsmouth, Hampshire, leaving in 1772 to join Mr Lockee's Military Academy, Little Chelsea, London, and later to Colonel Gallatin's School of Equitation for 7 months.

On 15 December 1773 he was commissioned as an ensign in the 14th Regiment of Foot. On 28 March 1774 he joined his regiment, moving to quarters in Dover on 13 May 1774. In March 1775 he left for America, where, on 25 August 1775, he was promoted to lieutenant in the 14th Foot. By 28 November 1778, he had returned to St George's, Hanover Square, London, where he married Anne Breynton (c. 1756 – 15 August 1829), the daughter of the famous minister in Nova Scotia, Rev Dr John Breynton (c. 1719–1799). In 1790, he bought Elmhurst Hall and various other properties in Staffordshire, while still maintaining a house in London. In 1794 he raised the Staffordshire Yeomanry Cavalry and was appointed its major and commander of the Lichfield Troop on 20 September. He left the regiment when he was appointed Lieutenant-Colonel Commandant of the new 3rd Staffordshire Militia on 25 April 1798. He was promoted to colonel on 15 January 1799, but the regiment was disbanded later that year. On 28 June 1803 he was appointed colonel of a new 2nd Staffordshire Militia, but this was also disbanded in 1805.

In 1797, he tried to sell off his Staffordshire estates and by 1800 he had moved to Lichfield. In 1806, he finally disposed of his Staffordshire properties, pulling down the derelict Elmhurst Hall. He moved back to London full-time, and took an oath as a Commissioner of Public Accounts, based at Somerset House in the Strand. Around this time he became a man of letters, addressing the foremost politicians of the time, while also writing for a magazine – The Aegis. The next year, he attempted to be elected as MP for Westminster in the 1807 United Kingdom general election. On Friday 8 May 1807, he attended a meeting at Covent Garden, London where he was introduced to the meeting, by Col. Robinson who at that time commanded London Recruiting District, and the Pimlico battalion of the Queen's Loyal Volunteers from about 1803. His election was unsuccessful and he returned to his literary pursuits.

He died at his home at 22 Portman Street, London on 23 August 1818 and was buried on 28 August in or by the western wall of the St Marylebone burial ground on the south side of Paddington Street, London – near to his father-in-law, the Rev Dr John Breynton.

== Family ==
Francis Perceval Eliot (1755–1818) with permission from The Eliot Archives

On 28 November 1778 at St George's, Hanover Square, London, Francis married Anne Breynton (c. 1756 – 15 August 1829), the daughter of Rev Dr John Breynton, and had by her 7 sons and 3 daughters:

1. William Granville Eliot (7 September 1779 – 26 August 1855), Lieutenant-Colonel RHA, who married firstly Harriet Ann Mann (30 June 1776 – 30 December 1812), a daughter of Gother Mann (21 December 1746 – 27 March 1830) Lieutenant-General of the Royal Engineers and Inspector General of Fortifications, and secondly Ann Heywood (24 May 1791 – 17 October 1857), a daughter of Samuel Heywood
2. Francis Breynton Eliot (1 April 1781 – 5 May 1855), Captain, who married Maria Sweet, was posted to Canada where they became the progenitors of the Canadian branch of the Eliot military family
3. Edward John Eliot (20 September 1782 – 6 November 1863), Captain, who married Margaret James (died 10 September 1881)
4. George Augustus Eliot (19 February 1784 – 6 August 1835), Lieutenant-Colonel RSC, who married Jane McCrea (9 March 1794 – 30 November 1877). George Augustus Eliot's army career progressed from the 62nd Foot, 103rd Foot, 68th Foot until arriving at Lower Canada. Here, his regiment is described variously as RSC or Royal England Province of Lower Canada District of Quebec. He described his rank as Brevet Colonel or Lieutenant-Colonel of Brigade.
5. Elizabeth Mary Eliot (11 October 1785 – 21 July 1872) who died unmarried
6. Lionel Ducket Eliot (27 March 1787 – March 1855), who married Charlotte Russell (1791 – 16 August 1851)
7. Ann Cathrina Eliot (8 November 1789 – 30 October 1891) who died unmarried
8. Henry Algernon Eliot (18 May 1790 – 17 August 1857), Rear-Admiral RN, who married firstly Jane Crombie (died 27 January 1846), daughter of Alexander Crombie, and secondly Maynard Baring (1813 – 15 January 1856), daughter of George Baring and granddaughter of Sir Francis Baring
9. Frances Charlotte Eliot (23 December 1791 – 28 October 1819) who died unmarried
10. Charles Turberville Eliot (4 July 1794 – 17 February 1875), who married Elizabeth Reed (1809 - January 1863)

Many of Eliot's sons went on to play significant roles in the British Armed Forces. His widow died 15 August 1829 at Blackheath, and was buried 19 August at St Mary's Church, Lewisham, Kent.

== Publications ==
- 1791–1800 Common Place Book
- 1794 "Letters on the subject of the arm'd Yeomanry, addressed to the ... Earl Gower Sutherland, etc." by Francis Perceval Eliot, second edition published Stafford 1794.
- 1797 "Six letters, etc." by Francis Perceval Eliot – another edition of "Letters on the subject of the arm'd Yeomanry, addressed to the ... Earl of Gower Sutherland, etc." – published London 1797 British Library Shelfmark: 8827.f.30
- 1807 "Demonstration, Or Financial Remarks With Occasional Observations on Political Occurrences" Printed for John Cawthorn, 1807 (London: T. Collins) 117 pages, xi, [10], [13] folded leaves of plates; 22 cm British Library Shelfmark: 8135.g.11
- 1811 "Observations on the Fallacy of the Supposed Depreciation of the Paper Currency of the Kingdom With Reasons For Dissenting From The Report of the Bullion Committee" by Francis Perceval Eliot Printed for J.J. Stockdale, London 1811. 171 pages, 24 cm British Library Shelfmark: 1028.e.3(4) and 1028.e.5.(1)
- 1811 "A Supplement To Observations on the Fallacy of the Supposed Depreciation of the Paper Currency of the Kingdom, &c." Printed for J.J. Stockdale, London 1811 28 pages, 21 cm
- 1814 "A series of letters on the Political and financial State of the nation at the commencement of 1814" by Falkland (i.e. Francis Perceval Eliot) – published 1814. British Library Shelfmark: P.P.3557.w
- 1814 "Letters on the Political and financial situation of the country in 1814; addressed to the Earl of Liverpool" by Francis Perceval Eliot – published 1814 British Library Shelfmark: P.P.3557.w
- 1815 "Three letters on the financial and political situation of the country in the year 1815 ... addressed to the Earl of Liverpool" by Francis Perceval Eliot – published 1815 British Library Shelfmark: P.P.3557.w. These letters proposed a system of measures based on a single weight measure, similar to the metric system used in France at the time
- 1816 "Letters on the political and financial situation of the British Empire, in the year 1816 ... addressed to the Earl of Liverpool" – published 1816 British Library Shelfmark: P.P.3557.w and C.T.114(1)

== See also ==
- Staffordshire Yeomanry (Queen's Own Royal Regiment)
- Staffordshire Militia

Military offices
Preceded by Unknown	Lieutenant of the 14th Regiment of Foot; 1775-	Succeeded by Unknown
Preceded by New unit	Major of the Staffordshire Yeomanry Cavalry; 1794-98	Succeeded by William Tennant
Preceded by New unit	Lieutenant-Colonel Commandant of the 3rd Staffordshire Militia; 1798-9	Succeeded by Disbanded
Preceded by New unit	Colonel of the 2nd Staffordshire Militia; 1803-5	Succeeded by Disbanded
Government offices
Preceded by Unknown	Commissioner of Public Accounts; 1806-1818	Succeeded by Unknown
German nobility
Preceded by Amable Elliott	Count Elliott	Declined and Discontinued
