= Arthur Skinner (police officer) =

New Zealand policeman and athlete

Arthur Skinner (1874–1940) was a New Zealand policeman and athlete. He was born in Fetternear, Aberdeenshire, Scotland in 1874.
