= Arthur Banks Skinner =

Former director of the Victoria and Albert Art Museum, London

Arthur Banks Skinner FSA (1861–1911) was Director of the Art Museum division of the Victoria and Albert Museum, London from 1905 to 1908. He died before he was 50 years of age.

Born in Kingsland, London, 4 September 1861 eldest child of accountant and deputy Paymaster of the Royal Courts of Justice George Edward Skinner (1836–1888) and his wife Anne Simpson Banks (1835–1919) and grandson of a Lymington Hampshire solicitors' clerk, he was educated at Dulwich College which he left in 1879. He was granted a B.A. by London University in 1883.

A B Skinner won a 1st in his Civil Service examinations, joined the Department of Science and Art and became a junior assistant at the Victoria and Albert Museum in 1879. He was appointed assistant director under Sir Caspar Purdon Clarke in 1896 and he succeeded Sir Caspar when he went to the Metropolitan Museum in New York in 1905.

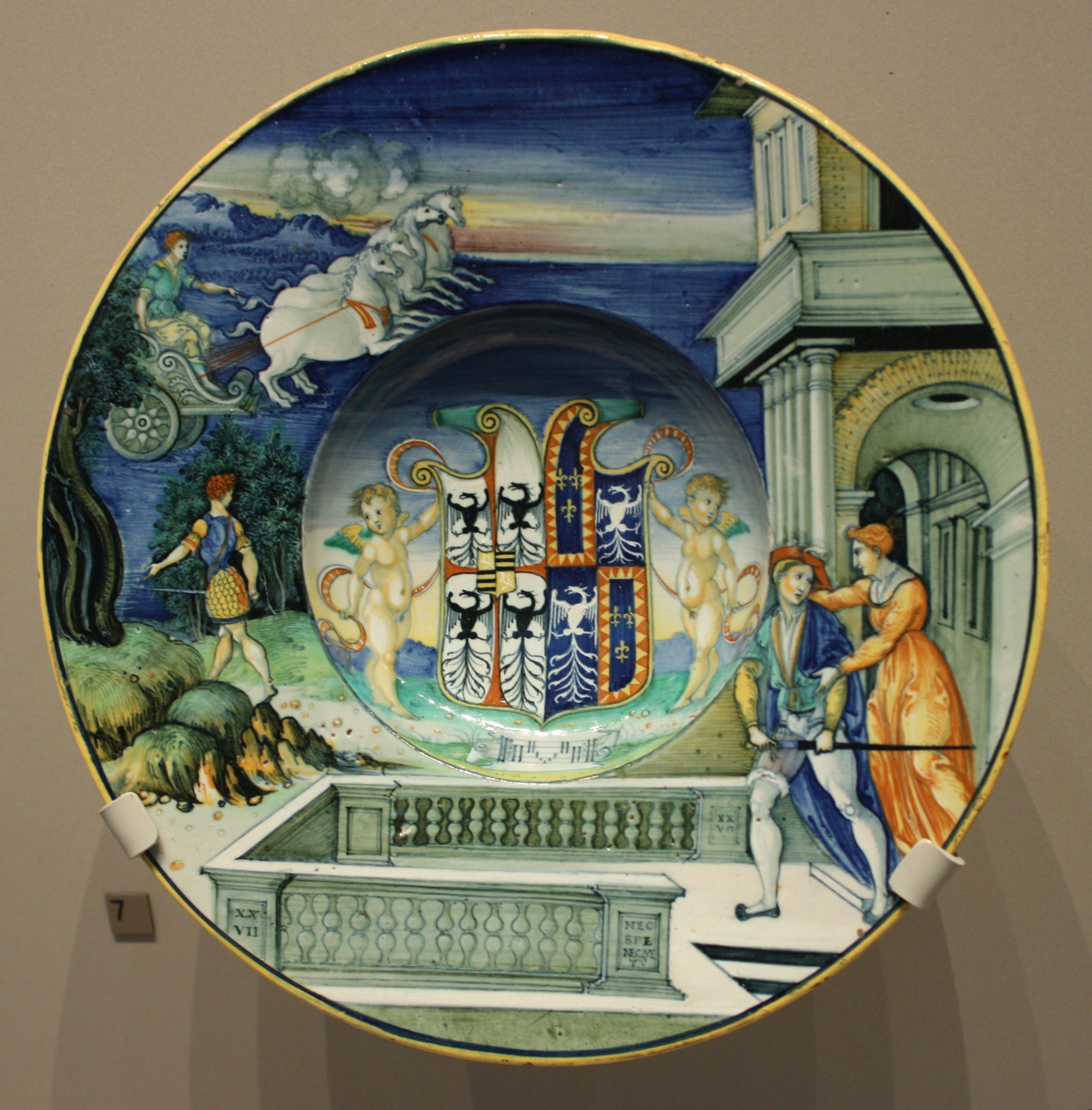
Nicola da Urbino, maiolica, 1524 Salting bequest Victoria & Albert Museum

He was Director of the Art Museum division of the Victoria and Albert Museum from 1905 to 1908. He was appointed Keeper Department of Architecture and Sculpture in 1909.

His obituary in The Times reports that he was a close friend of George Salting and responsible for that man's "magnificent bequest" to the museum.

On 22 October 1895 he married Bertha Julia Filmer of Tunbridge Wells. They were to have a daughter and two sons.

A B Skinner was an honorary member of Egyptian Institute Cairo, Academy of Fine Arts Milan and Archaeological Society Brussels.

Aged only 49 he died at Crossways Hollington Sussex, 7 March 1911 and is buried in Hastings Cemetery, Hastings, East Sussex. His wife survived him and died in 1950.
