= John Breynton =

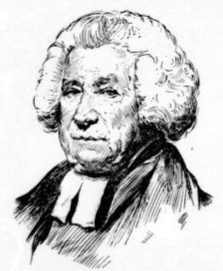
- Born: 1719; Trefeglwys, Montgomeryshire, Wales
- Died: 15 July 1799 (aged 80); Edgware Road, London
- Burial place: St Marylebone Burial ground, Paddington Street, London
- Spouses: Elizabeth Wade (with issue) (m. 1750–1778); Mary Gerrish née Cradock (m. 1779–1799)
- Children: Mary Breynton; Anne Breynton; John Breynton; Henry Edward Breynton
- Parent: John Breynton
- Religion: Church of England
- Church: St Paul's Church, Halifax, Nova Scotia; St George's 'Little Dutch' (Deutsch) Church, Halifax, Nova Scotia

John Breynton (1719 – 15 July 1799) was a minister in Halifax, Nova Scotia, Canada.

He was born in Trefeglwys, Montgomeryshire, Wales to John Breynton (born 1670 Llanidloes) and his second wife, and baptised on 13 April 1719. He spent his first 14 years between his home at Trefeglwys and school in nearby Newtown. From 1733 to 1738, he attended Shrewsbury School, and in 1738, matriculated at Magdalene College, Cambridge, subsequently gaining a BA in 1741.

In 1742, he was commissioned as a chaplain in the Royal Navy. By 1745, he was a chaplain on a ship of war and served in the Siege of Louisbourg (1745). In 1750, he received an MA from Cambridge, and married Elizabeth Wade at St Mary and St Michael Church, Trumpington, Cambridgeshire. He was sent by the Society for the Propagation of the Gospel in Foreign Parts, or Venerable Society, to assist at St Paul's Church, Halifax, Nova Scotia under the auspices of the Bishop of London, while the rector William Tutty returned to London on private business, during which trip Tutty died in 1754. Breynton immediately took over as missionary and minister, or Rector, at St Paul's in 1754.

Earlier, in 1753, he had founded the first free school in Nova Scotia. In 1760, he consecrated St George's 'Little Dutch' (Deutsch) Church - the second oldest church in Halifax, becoming fluent in German as a result. In 1770, he was awarded an honorary degree of Doctor of Divinity by the University of Oxford. He returned to London during 1771–1772 to collect his degree, but returned to resume his post in Halifax. By 30 October 1776, he was Chaplain to the Royal Fencible American Regiment. He baptised many Blacks in Halifax who arrived after the American Revolution, and purchased a slave's freedom in 1776.

On 13 September 1778, his first wife died, shortly before the 28 November 1778 wedding of their daughter Anne in St George's, Hanover Square.

By 6 September 1779, as a widower, he remarried and continued as Rector of St Paul's Church, Halifax. With his second wife, he appears to have returned to London shortly after 1785, continuing to draw his Halifax salary of £190 pa until he resigned and was replaced in 1791. In June 1792, he was lodging at Mary Riley's, 63 Edgware Road, London, when he was burgled. The burglar was caught and sentenced to death.

Because of his fluency in German, he was reported to have been a chaplain to Queen Charlotte. He remained in London until his death in 1799.

== Family ==
Breynton married twice:

He married firstly Elizabeth Wade (died 13 September 1778 Halifax, Nova Scotia), on 8 September 1750 at St Mary and St Michael Church, Trumpington, Cambridgeshire, with issue:

1. Mary Breynton (CIR 1753–1795), married 19 Aug 1775 Halifax, Nova Scotia to Captain John Watson
2. Anne Breynton (1755–1829), married 28 November 1778 St George's Hanover Square, London to Francis Perceval Eliot
3. John Breynton (1756–1843), married 9 Jan 1793 St Mary's Church, Lichfield to Elizabeth Cotton
4. Henry Edward Breynton (1759–1761)

He married secondly the widow, Mrs Mary Gerrish née Cradock, (18 May 1723 Boston, Massachusetts, United States - December 1806 Lichfield, Staffordshire, England), on 9 September 1779 at Halifax, Nova Scotia, with no issue. She was the daughter of George Cradock and his wife Mary née Lyde of Boston, Massachusetts, and the widow of Joseph Gerrish (Boston, Massachusetts 1709-1774 Halifax, Nova Scotia), whom she had married in 1768 Halifax, Nova Scotia.

Breynton died on 15 July 1799 in Edgware Road, Paddington, London. He was buried in the St Marylebone Burial ground, Paddington Street, London. His widow died in December 1806 at Lichfield, Staffordshire.
