= George Washington Whistler =

American civil engineer (1800–1849)

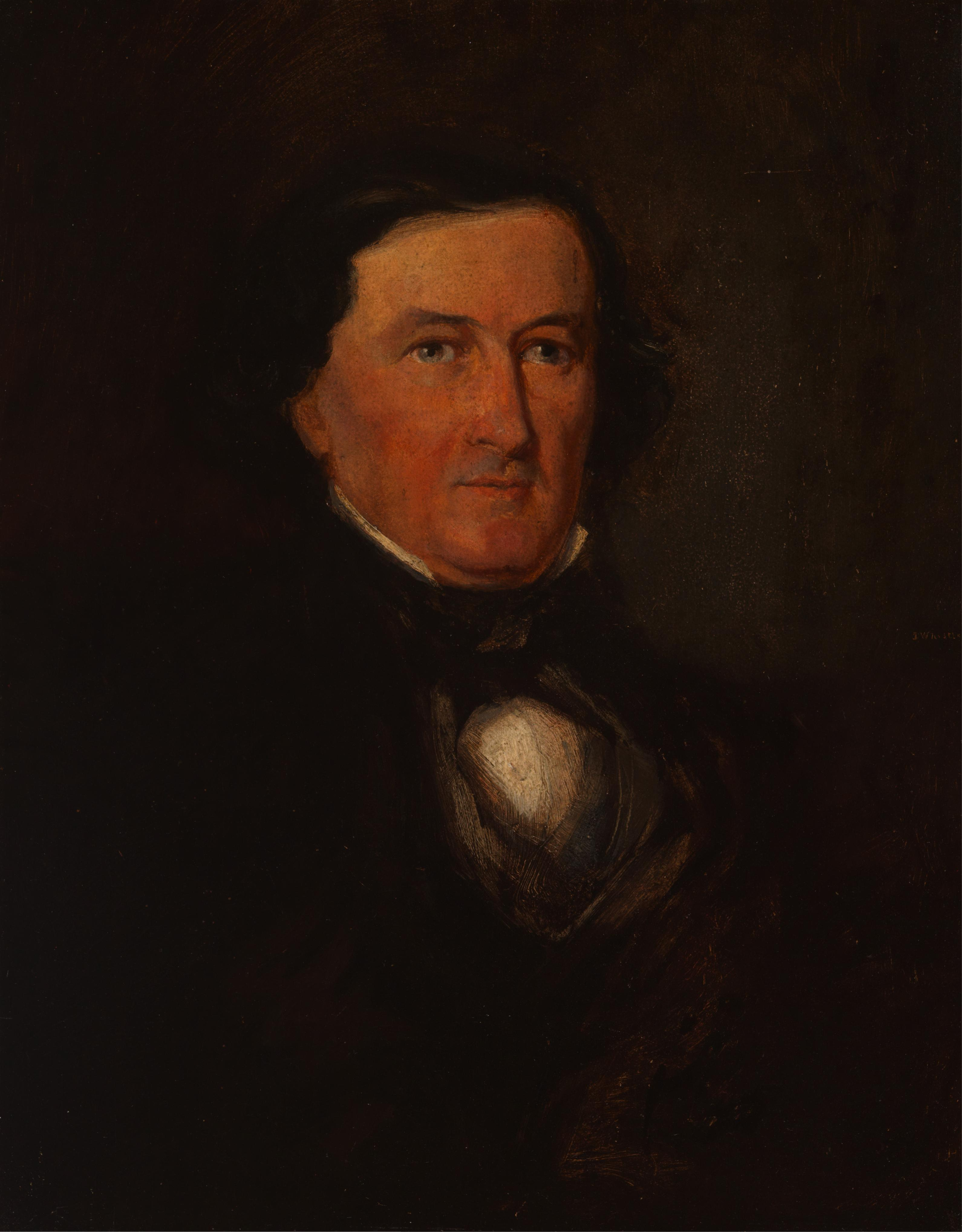
- Portrait of Major George Washington Whistler by Henry Inman
- Born: May 19, 1800; Fort Wayne, Indiana, US
- Died: April 7, 1849 (aged 48); St. Petersburg, Russia
- Burial place: Stonington, Connecticut, US
- Education: United States Military Academy
- Occupation: Civil engineer
- Spouses: Mary Roberdeau Swift (m. 1821; died 1827) Anna Mathilda McNeill (m. 1831)
- Children: 8; including James McNeill Whistler
- Parent(s): John Whistler and Anna Bishop

George Washington Whistler (May 19, 1800 – April 7, 1849) was an American civil engineer best known for building steam locomotives and railroads. He is credited with introducing the steam whistle to American locomotives.

In 1842, Tsar Nicholas I hired him to build the Saint Petersburg–Moscow Railway, Russia's first large-scale railroad. One of Whistler's important influences was the introduction of the Howe truss for the Russian railroad's bridges. This inspired the renowned Russian engineer Dmitrii Ivanovich Zhuravskii to perform studies and develop structural analysis techniques for Howe truss bridges.

He was the father of American artist James McNeill Whistler, whose painting Whistler's Mother (of his second wife Anna Whistler) is among the most famous paintings in American art.

== Early life and family ==
George Washington Whistler was born on May 19, 1800, at the military outpost of Fort Wayne, Indiana, to Major John Whistler (1756–1829) and his wife Anna Bishop. Fort Wayne at that time was a part of the Northwest Territory but became part of the new Indiana Territory in the year he was born. His father had been a British soldier under General Burgoyne at the Battles of Saratoga in the Revolutionary War, later to enlist in American service.

Whistler had three children with his first wife, Mary Roberdeau Swift, who died at a young age in 1827. Whistler then married the sister of his friend William Gibbs McNeill (1801–1853), Anna Mathilda McNeill (1804–1881), with whom he had five sons: James Abbott McNeill Whistler, William McNeill Whistler (1836–1900), Kirk Boott (1838–1842) named after Kirk Boott, Charles Donald Whistler (1841–1843), and John Bouttatz Whistler (1845–1846), named after Whistler's Russian engineer friend Major Ivan F. Bouttatz. Whistler and William Gibbs McNeil lived in Fisher Ames' house while working on the Boston and Providence Railroad.

== Education and career ==
Whistler graduated from the United States Military Academy in 1819. Upon graduation, Whistler was commissioned a Second Lieutenant in the Corps of Artillery serving as a topography engineer at Fort Columbus, New York, from 1819 to 1821. When the Army was reorganized in 1821, he became a Second Lieutenant in the First Artillery. From 1821 to 1822, Whistler was an Assistant Professor of Drawing at West Point.

Whistler was reassigned back to artillery corps duty as a topographical engineer in 1822, his first assignment was supporting the Commission tracing the international boundary between Lake Superior and Lake of the Woods. Subsequent to the passage of the General Survey Act of 1824, Whistler later conducted surveys for locating railroads working under John James Abert, the head of the Topographic Bureau.

=== Baltimore and Ohio railroad ===
In 1827, Whistler's brother-in-law and fellow engineer William Gibbs McNeill became a member of the Baltimore and Ohio railroad's "Board of Civil Engineers for the Construction of the Road" (1827‑30). Still on active duty, Whistler joined the railroad's engineer corps the next year in 1828. Together, Whistler, McNeill, and Jonathan Knight went to Great Britain to study railroad engineering, where they were welcomed by President Telford, of the British Institution of Civil Engineers, where they also met with George Stephenson and son Robert Stephenson, John Walker, Joseph Locke, Jesse Hartley, and other eminent British engineers. They also saw the British railroad, the Stockton and Darlington, the world's first public railway to use steam locomotives. As one observer wrote:

Apparently there was nothing to keep American engineers with adequate credentials from seeing all they wanted to see and from asking about all that they wanted to learn. As a result the American engineers developed knowledge of railroads in three areas –

(1) (Steam) locomotives and inclined planes, the two "new" elements in railroads,
(2) the uses of materials- especially stone, wood and iron- in construction, and

(3) the principles of laying out routes feasible for railroad travel.

Whistler supervised construction of the first rails on the railroad in October 1829, consisting of wood and iron from Pratt Street to the Carrollton Viaduct. The railroad's future road master, Wendel Bollman, helped with the construction layout as a fifteen-year-old carpenter.

=== Other railroads ===
In 1830, McNeill and Whistler entered the service of the Baltimore and Susquehanna railroad, Whistler remaining on the project for the first 20 miles of main and branch track had been completed. In 1831‑32, Whistler provided engineering services for the Paterson and Hudson River railroad (now the southern terminus of the Erie Railroad); and in 1833‑34, upon the Providence and Stonington Railroad. Whistler resigned his army engineer commission in December 1833. In 1835, along with William Gibbs McNeill, Whistler designed the Boston & Providence Railroad, which included the famous Canton Viaduct which has been in continuous service for 174 years.

=== Locomotive designer and builder ===
In 1834, Whistler became chief engineer at the Proprietors of Locks and Canals in the new city of Lowell, Massachusetts. Whistler was one of the few locomotive designers and builders in the early 19th century that had an academic education. As superintendent of the Proprietors of Locks and Canals Co. water powered machine shop in Lowell (1834–1837), Whistler was responsible for the design of the earliest steam locomotive built in New England. In 1835, he worked with Patrick Tracy Jackson to begin the Boston & Lowell Railroad.

Whistler's first locomotive, the Patrick, was produced for the Boston & Lowell Railroad. This locomotive and others built by the firm were initially copies of Stephenson Planet types (2-2-0s). In 1836, the first two steam locomotives known to have been equipped with whistles were built by Whistler as 2-2-0 types; the Hicksville for the Long Island Railroad and the Susquehanna for the Wilmington & Susquehanna Railroad. In 1838, Baltimore and Ohio railroad engineers Knight and Latrobe surveyed steam locomotives for their management, some of which included machines built in Whistler's Lowell shops.

The (Long Island railroad) engine burns one cord of wood in each circular trip of 48 miles, conveying an average load of twenty tons of freight, in four cars, each weighing two tons – the weight of engine being 8.5 tons, with its fuel and water in the boiler, and having six tons on the two driving wheels; the tender weighs 4.5 tons with fuel and water, the additional quantity of wood consumed in getting up steam, being about one-fifth of a cord.

— Knight, Latrobe,

Whistler built three machines for the Boston and Providence Rail Road, they were almost 9 tons in gross weight and 6 tons in weight on the five-foot driving wheels, a 2-4-0 configuration. These machines had 11 inch cylinders with a 16 inch stroke. Whistler also built one locomotive for the New Jersey and Patterson Rail Road weighing 8 tons gross. Whistler left Lowell in 1837 and was followed by his apprentice, James B Francis. The Lowell Machine Shop's locomotive production continued until 1854.

=== Western railroad (Massachusetts) ===
1837 Western Railroad map, Springfield to State Line

Soon after Whistler's work on the Stonington Railroad he was engaged to consult on the Western railroad again with McNeill from 1836 to 1842. In October 1839, the road's Board of Directors hired Whistler as its Chief engineer.

The main problem in locating the railroad were the steep grades west of the Westfield River, a major tributary of the Connecticut River, which were in excess of 80 feet to the mile, (actually 1.65% west of Chester, Massachusetts). At that time in 1842, there was no known locomotive that could deliver the tractive effort to climb that grade. The first locomotives purchased for the road in 1842 were Ross Winan's "crabs" or 0-8-0s which could not handle the grade. Whistler substituted Stephenson Planet types (2-2-0s) which delivered satisfactory service.

=== Saint Petersburg–Moscow Railway ===
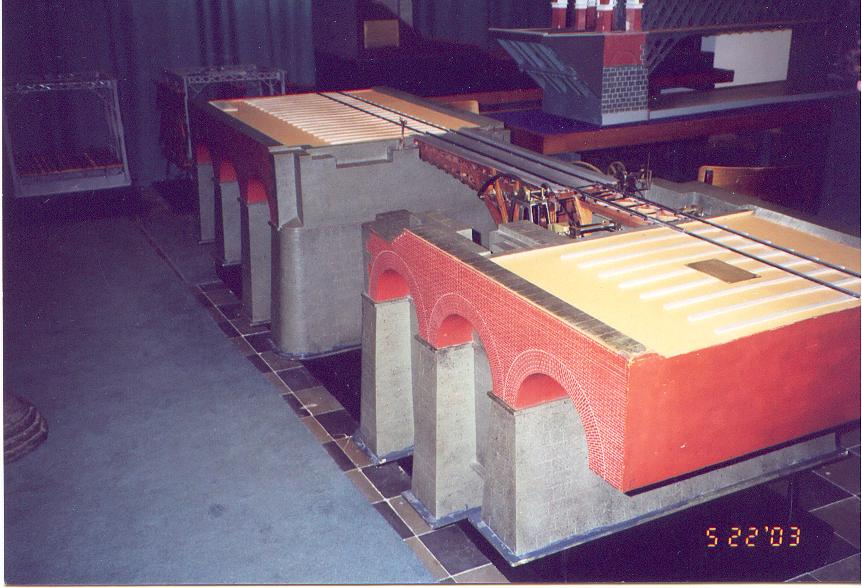
A bridge model of similar design to the Canton Viaduct at the October Railroad Museum in St. Petersburg

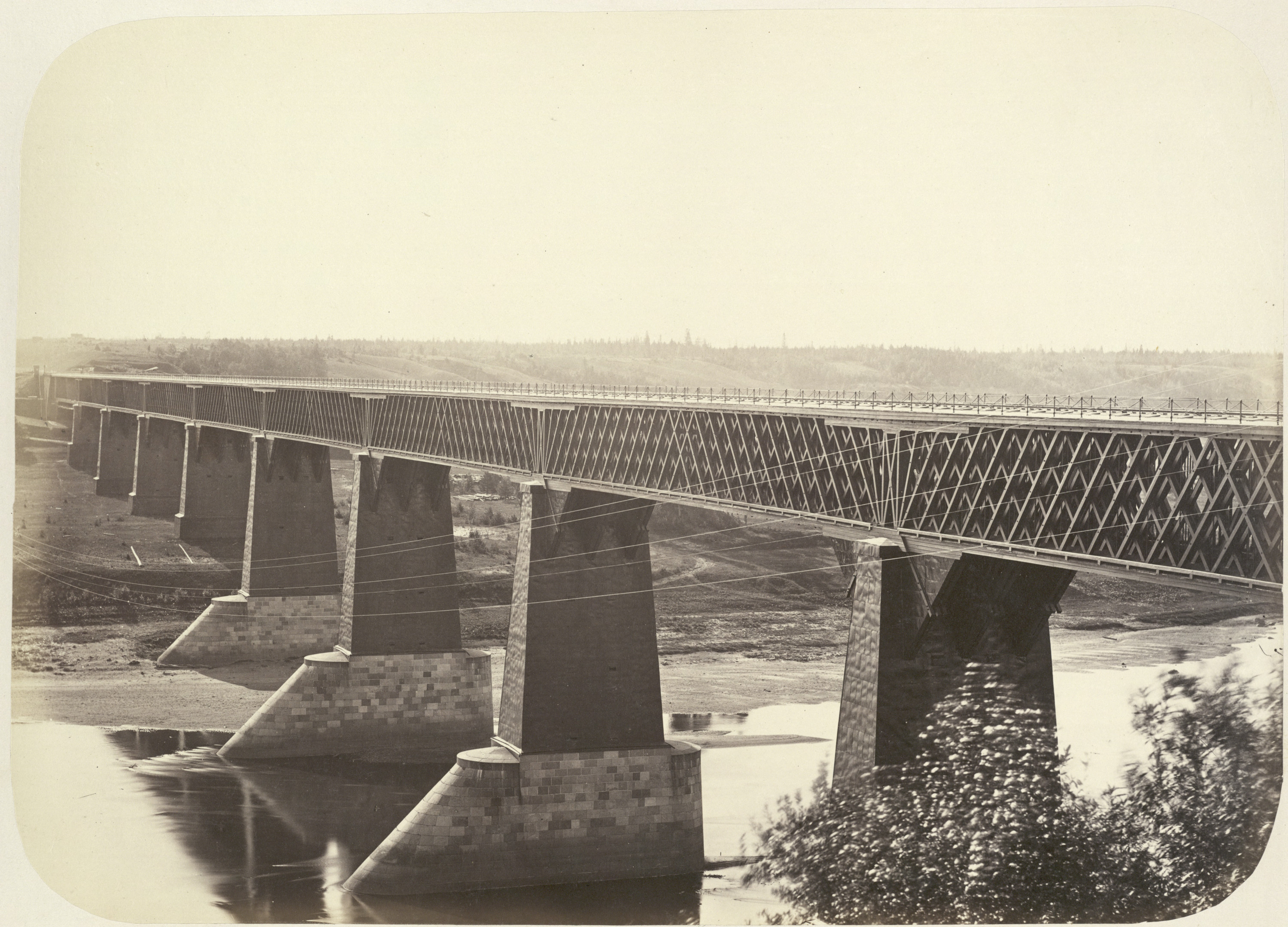
Msta River Howe truss railroad bridge

Tsar Nicholas I invited Whistler to help build the Saint Petersburg–Moscow Railway, which would be Russia's first major railroad.

Although the Tsarskoye Selo Railway, built by Germany's Franz Anton Ritter von Gerstner in 1837, was Russia's first public railway line, the cost overruns led Tsar Nicholas I and his advisors to doubt Gerstner's ability to execute the planned St. Petersburg–Moscow line. So two professors from St. Petersburg's Institute of the Corps of Transportation Engineers, Pavel Petrovich Melnikov and Nikolai Osipovich Kraft, traveled to the United States in 1839 to study railroad technology. Melnikov and Kraft spoke with Whistler and recommended that the Russian government retain Whistler as a consulting engineer on the Saint Petersburg – Moscow Railway, and Whistler was given a seven-year contract.

Whistler left for Russia in June 1842, accompanied by imperial engineer Major Ivan F. Bouttatz, who would become Whistler's friend. He received the Order of Saint Anna by the Russian Emperor in 1847 but contracted cholera and died on April 7, 1849, in Saint Petersburg, Russia, two years before the line was completed.

== Professional associations ==
Whistler was part of the first efforts to form a national engineering association in the United States, although unsuccessful, it was thirteen years ahead of the American Society of Civil Engineers and Architects, which was co-founded in 1852 by his nephew Julius Walker Adams. There was an organizational meeting in Baltimore, Maryland, in 1839 that elected Benjamin Latrobe as its president. The organizing committee included some of the most prominent and representative engineers of the day such as: J. B. Jervis and Benjamin Wright of New York, Moncure Robinson and Claude Crozet of Virginia, Jonathan Knight of Maryland, J. Edgar Thomson then in Georgia, later in Pennsylvania.

== Legacy ==
Whistler's stone arch railroad bridges built in 1841 are still in freight and passenger service on the CSX mainline in western Massachusetts. He was the first civil engineer in America to use contour lines to show elevation and relief on maps.

== Works ==
- Whistler, G. W., Faden, W., & United States. (1838). The British colonies in North America. (Message from the President of the United States, transmitting the information required by a resolution of the House of Representatives of the 28th May last, in relation to the boundary between the United States and Great Britain.)
- Swift, McNeill and Whistler, G.E., Reports of the Engineers of the Western Railroad Corporation,1838, Springfield, MA, Merriam, Wood and company. Archive copy at the Internet Archive PDF
- Western Rail-Road Corporation., Whistler, G. W., & Massachusetts. (1839). Extracts from the 39th chapter of the revised statutes, concerning rail roads. Springfield, Mass.: publisher not identified.
- Albany and West Stockbridge Railroad Company. (1842). Reports of the engineers of the Albany and West Stockbridge Rail-road Company: Made to the directors in 1840–1. Albany N.Y.: Printed by C. Van Benthuysen.
- Whistler, G. W., Crerar Manuscript Collection (University of Chicago. Library), & University of Chicago. (1842). Report to Count Kleinmichel on gauge of track to be used in the St. Petersburg and Moscow Railroad.
- Whistler, G. W., & Philadelphia & Reading Railroad Co. (1849). Report upon the use of anthracite coal in locomotive engines on the Reading Rail Road: Made to the president of the Philadelphia and Reading Rail Road Company. Baltimore: J.D. Toy. Report at Google Books

== See also ==
- Walk-in-the-Water (steamboat), illustrations of this vessel by Whistler.
