= William McNeill Whistler =

American surgeon (1836–1900)

William McNeill Whistler MRCS, MRCP
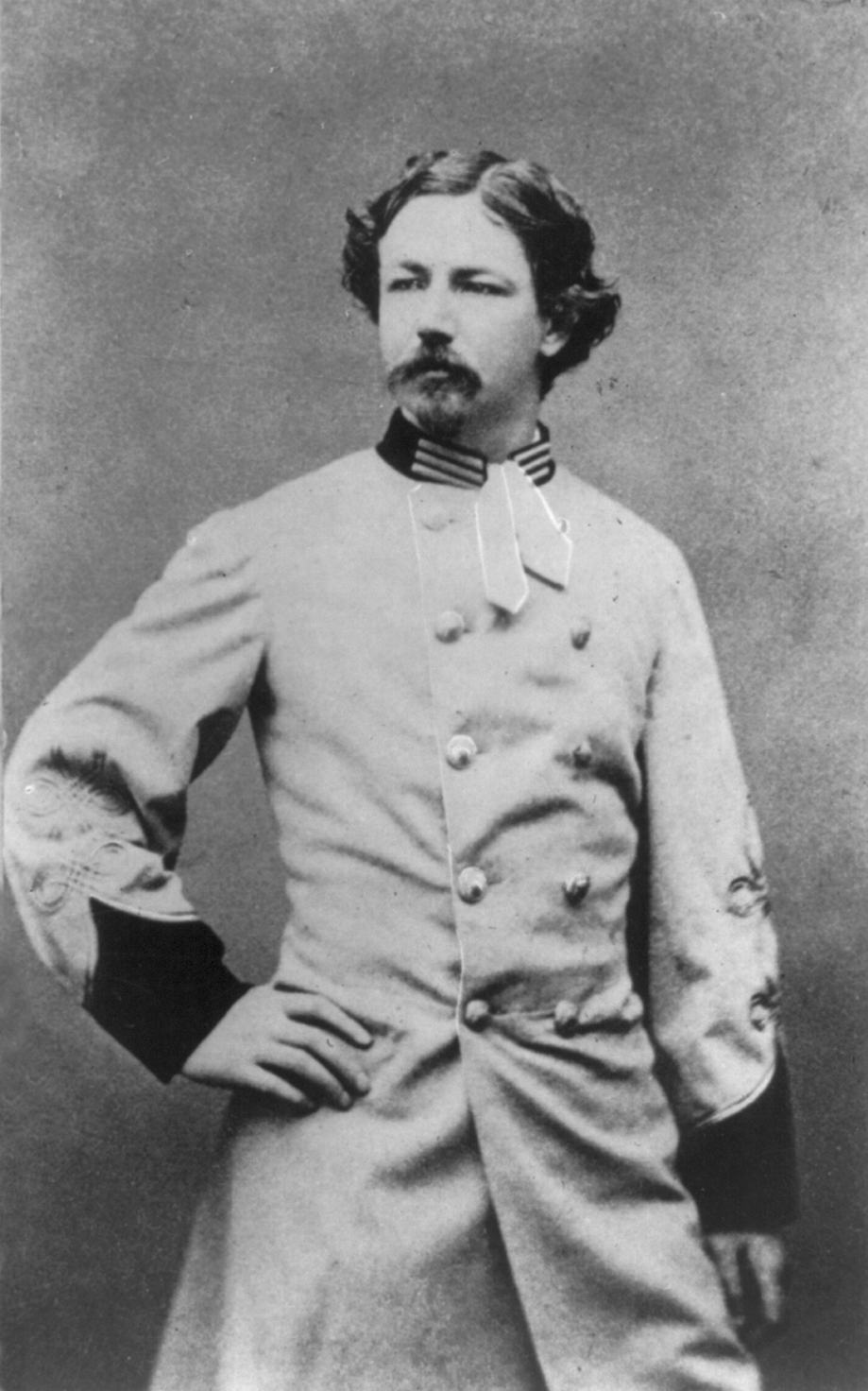
- Dr. William McNeill Whistler, C.S.A.
- Born: July 22, 1836; Lowell, Massachusetts, U.S
- Died: February 27, 1900 (aged 63); London, England
- Burial place: Hastings Cemetery
- Other name: W. McNeill Whistler
- Education: Columbia College; Trinity College; University of Pennsylvania School of Medicine
- Spouses: Ida Bayard King; Helen Euphrosyne Ionides
- Relatives: George Washington Whistler (father) Anna McNeill Whistler (mother) James McNeill Whistler (brother)
- Medical career
- Profession: surgeon and medical doctor
- Institutions: London Throat Hospital St George's Hospital. Confederate States Army
- Sub-specialties: Laryngological, Rhinological and Otological medicine

William McNeill Whistler (July 22, 1836 – February 27, 1900) was an American physician and a medical army officer for the Confederacy during the American Civil War. He was the younger brother of artist James McNeill Whistler.

== Early life ==
Whistler was born in Lowell, Massachusetts, the second son of George Washington Whistler and Anna McNeill Whistler. His father was a former West Point graduate who abandoned a military career to become a civil engineer specializing in railroad construction. In 1842 Czar Nicholas I hired him to build the Saint Petersburg–Moscow Railway, and he brought his family out to Saint Petersburg the following year. The Whistlers would spend the next five years in Russia, leaving in 1848 to escape a cholera epidemic that would claim the life of George Whistler the following year.

Anna Whistler returned to the United States with her two sons, settling in Pomfret, Connecticut. Whistler attended Christ Church School in Pomfret, and St. James College in Williamsport, Maryland from 1850 to 1852. He enrolled in Columbia College in 1853, but never graduated. While there, he was a member of the Fraternity of Delta Psi (St. Anthony Hall).

He enrolled as a pre-med student at Trinity College in Hartford, Connecticut in March 1855. He apprenticed to Dr. James Darrach of Philadelphia in 1857. He enrolled in the Pennsylvania Medical School in 1858, graduating in 1860 with honors.

== Career ==
After the outbreak of the Civil War, Whistler moved to Richmond, Virginia, where he attempted to secure a commission as a medical officer with the Confederate States Army. When he was unsuccessful, he instead joined as a clerk, in 1861, because he needed money. On his application, he wrote, " “Being a physician by profession, I felt that the only true position for me was on the medical staff, as the want of any military education disqualified me for any other office." In the fall of 1862, he was appointed as an assistant surgeon operating in the Richmond area. This work included service in various Richmond locations, including Libby Prison and Drewry's Bluff.

In April 1864, Whistler was given a field assignment, becoming assistant surgeon in the 1st South Carolina Rifle Regiment or "Orr's Rifles". Arriving at his post in time for the battle of Spotsylvania Court House, he made a favorable impression on his new comrades by "[ordering] his servant to take his horse to the rear and out of danger, while he remained with the line of battle until it entered the Bloody Angle, and he was detained to look after such as had fallen in the charge." He took part in the battles of Jericho Ford, Riddle's Shop, Petersburg, Deep Bottom, Fussell's Mill, Ream's Station and Jones's Farm.

In February 1865, Whistler was granted four months of leave because of his poor health. He decided to visit his mother, who was now living in London. Reporting at Richmond he was also given government dispatches to deliver to Britain. Attempts to reach Charleston, South Carolina and Wilmington, North Carolina to sail on a blockade runner were frustrated by Union troop movements. Ultimately he teamed up with another Confederate officer and slipped across the Chesapeake and through the Union lines to Philadelphia, using a false name while dressed in civilian clothing. He made his way to New York and sailed for London aboard the SS City of Manchester. He arrived in England and delivered the dispatches, but learned a week later of Robert E. Lee's surrender.

Whistler never returned to the United States. He spent a year traveling in Europe before continuing his medical career in Paris, France, where he worked in hospitals and taught in medical schools. He then moved to London sometime in 1868, where he established a private practice and worked at St George's Hospital. He was a founder and senior physician at the London Throat Hospital.

He became a Member of the Royal College of Surgeons in 1871 and a Member of the Royal College of Physicians in 1876. He presented a paper on the subject of syphilis of the larynx at the Hospital for Diseases of the Throat and Chest in London in 1879. He was the honorary physician to the National Training School of Music and a corresponding fellow of the American Laryngological Association. He was also president of the British Laryngological, Rhinological and Otological Association.

== Publications ==
- Lectures on Syphilis of the Larynx. London: J. & A. Churchill, 1878.
- Notes on Operations in Syphilitic Strictures of the Larynx. London: Pardon & Sons Printers, 1881.

== Personal life ==
Late in 1860 Whistler married his cousin, Florida "Ida" Bayard King from Georgia. His southern wife encouraged him to support the Confederacy in the Civil War. The couple settled in Richmond, Virginia. Ida fell ill, and she died in March 1863 while being nursed by her mother-in-law. They did not have any children.

On April 17, 1877, William married for a second time. His bride, Helen "Nellie" Euphrosyne Ionides (1849-1917), came from a wealthy Greek merchant family from Tulse Hill and was an occasional model for William's brother James Whistler. They did not have any children.

His brother James McNeill Whistler painted Whistler's portrait several times, including Portrait of Dr. William McNeill Whistler, Portrait of Dr. Whistler, No. 2, Portrait studies of the artist, his brother Dr. Whistler.

He died of influenza in 1900 at his home in London, England. He is buried at Hastings Cemetery and Crematorium, Hastings, East Sussex, England.

== External resources ==
- Portrait by James McNeill Whistler
