= Joe (given name) =

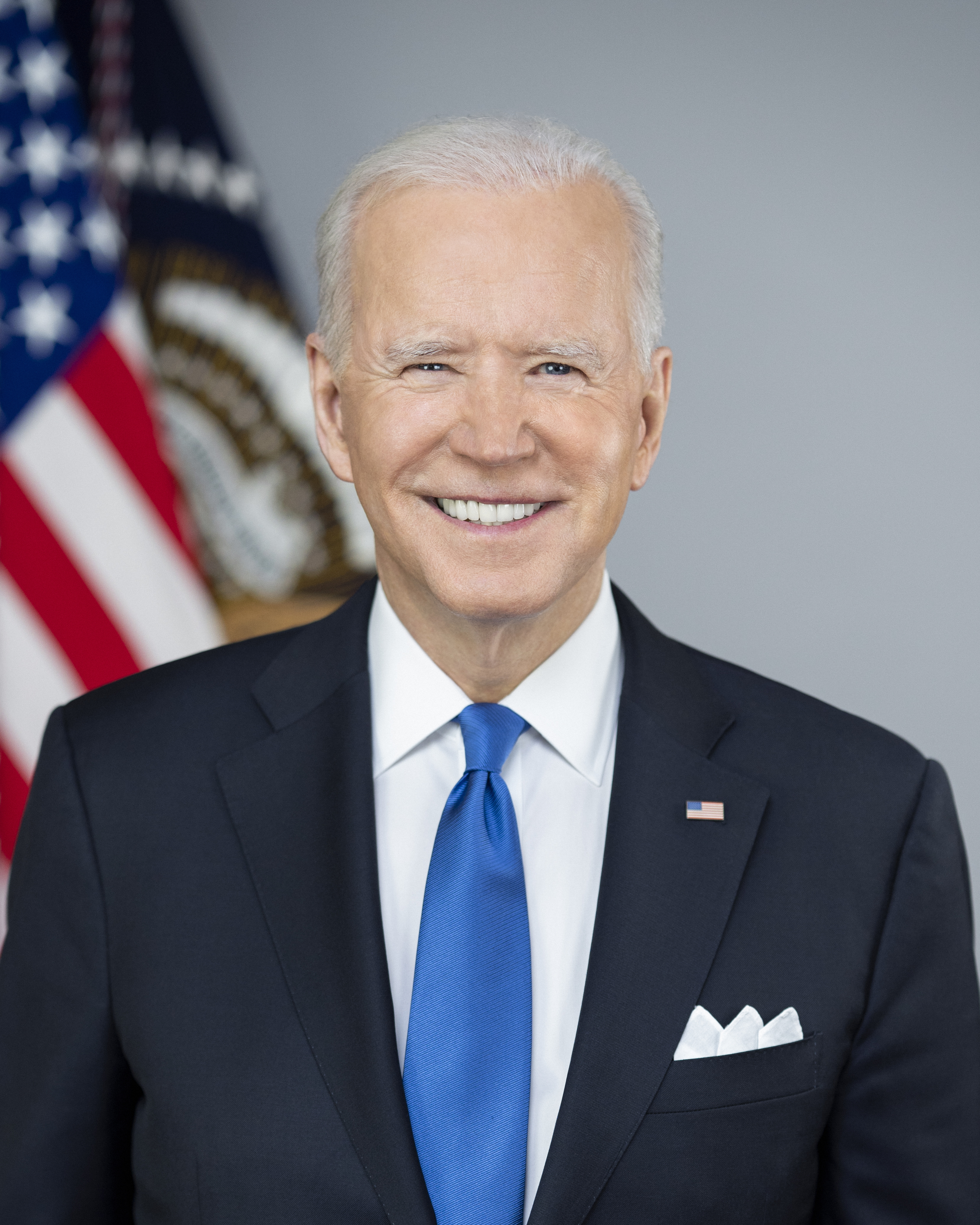
- Joe Biden's official portrait
- Pronunciation: /dʒoʊ/ JO
- Gender: Male
- Language: English

Origin
- Languages: 1. Hebrew; 2. English
- Origin: Diminutive form of Joseph
- Region of origin: English-speaking world

Other names
- Alternative spelling: Joey; Jo
- Related names: Joseph, Joey, Jo

Joe is a masculine given name, usually a short form of Joseph.

== People with the given name ==
=== Actors ===
- Joe Alaskey (1952–2016), American voice actor
- Joe Alwyn (born 1991), British actor
- Joe Anders (born 2003), American-British actor
- Joe Anoa'i (born 1985), known professionally as Roman Reigns, American wrestler, actor and former college football player
- Joe Ashman (born 1995), English actor
- Joe Besser (1907–1988), American actor
- Joe DeRita (1909–1993), American actor
- Joe Duttine (born 1974), English actor
- Joe Lynch (actor) (1925–2001), Irish actor
- Joe Locke (born 2003), Manx actor
- Joe Mantegna (born 1947), American actor
- Joe Morton (born 1947), American actor
- Joe Nunez, American actor
- Joe Pesci (born 1943), American actor
- Joe Piscopo (born 1951), American actor

=== Athletes ===
==== Baseball ====
- Joe Black (1924–2002), American baseball pitcher
- Joe DiMaggio (1914–1999), American baseball player
- Joe Horlen (1937–2022), American baseball pitcher
- Joe Mauer (born 1983), American baseball player
- Joe Musgrove (born 1992), American baseball pitcher
- Joe Whitman (born 2001), American baseball pitcher

==== Basketball ====
- Joe Alexander (born 1986), American-Israeli basketball player in the Israel Basketball Premier League
- Joe Courtney (basketball) (born 1969), American basketball player
- Joe Ingles (born 1987), Australian basketball player
- Joe Ragland (born 1989), American-Liberian basketball player for Hapoel Holon of the Israeli Basketball Premier League
- Joe Johnson (born 1981), American basketball player and 7 time NBA All-Star

==== Boxing ====
- Joe Bugner (1950–2025), British–Australian boxer
- Joe Calzaghe (born 1972), Welsh boxer
- Joe Frazier (1944–2011), American boxer
- Joe Hipp (born 1962), American retired professional heavyweight boxer
- Joe Louis (1914–1981), American boxer
- Joe Lydon (boxer) (1878–1937), American boxer and soccer player
- Joe Lynch (boxer) (1898–1965), American boxer

==== Cricket ====
- Joe Blackledge (1928–2008), English cricketer
- Joe Root (born 1990), English cricketer
- Joe Sayers (cricketer) (born 1983), English cricketer

==== Football ====
- Joe Allen (born 1990), Welsh footballer
- Joe Alt (born 2003), American football player
- Joe Bachie (born 1998), American football player
- Joe Blackett (1875–1???), English footballer
- Joe Burrow (born 1996), American football player
- Joe Byler (1922–1944), American football tackle
- Joe DeLamielleure (born 1951), American football player
- Joe Evans (American football) (born 1999), American college football player
- Joe Felix (born 1999), English footballer
- Joe Flacco (born 1985), American football player
- Joe Gaziano (born 1996), American football player
- Joe Giles-Harris (born 1997), American football player
- Joe Gomez (footballer) (born 1997), English footballer
- Joe Greene (born 1946), American football player
- Joe Hatch (born 2006), Welsh footballer
- Joe Healy (born 1986), English footballer
- Joe Hendry (footballer) (1886–1966), Scottish footballer
- Joe Horn Jr. (born 1994), American football player
- Joe Huber (born 2002), American football player
- Joe Jacobson (born 1986), Welsh footballer
- Joe Kapp (1938–2023), American and Canadian football player
- Joe Mixon (born 1996), American football player
- Joe Montana (born 1956), American football player
- Joe Moreino (born 1955), American football player
- Joe Namath (born 1943), American football player
- Joe Ostman (born 1995), American football player
- Joe Palatsides (born 1965), Australian football player
- Joe Perry (American football) (1927–2011), American football player
- Joe Pisarcik (born 1952), American football player
- Joe Powell (American football) (born 1994), American football player
- Joe Rodon (born 1997), Welsh footballer
- Joe Rowe (American football) (born 1973), American football player
- Joe Royer, American football player
- Joe Theismann (born 1949), American football player
- Joe Webb (born 1986), American football player

==== Hockey ====
- Joe Blackburn (born 1979), American ice hockey player
- Joe Ironstone (1898–1972), Canadian ice hockey player
- Joe Pavelski, American ice hockey player
- Joe Sakic (born 1969), Canadian ice hockey player
- Joe Thornton (born 1979), Canadian-American ice hockey player
- Joe Veleno (born 2000), Canadian ice hockey player

==== Racing ====
- Joe Graf Jr. (born 1998), American racing driver
- Joe Millikan (born 1950), American racing driver

==== Other sports ====
- Joe Bedford (born 1984), English professional rugby union player
- Joe Blanchard (1928–2012), American professional wrestler and professional wrestling promoter
- Joe Doering (1982–2026), American professional wrestler
- Joe Egan (Paralympian) (born 1953), Australian athlete and volleyballer
- Joe Egan (rugby league) (1919–2012), English rugby league footballer and coach
- Joe Gomez (wrestler) (born 1973), American professional wrestler
- Joe Henderson (runner) (born 1943), American runner
- Joe Hendry (born 1988), Scottish professional wrestler
- Joe Lydon (rugby) (born 1963), English rugby league footballer and rugby union coach
- Joe Malenko (born 1956), American retired professional wrestler
- Joe Pazandak (1914–1982), American amateur and professional wrestler
- Joe Pedicino (1949–2020), American professional wrestling announcer, commentator, promoter, television and radio producer
- Joe Perry (snooker player) (born 1974), English snooker player
- Joe Stecher (1893–1974), American professional wrestler

=== Businesspeople ===
- Joe Bacal (died 2019), co-founder of Griffin-Bacal Advertising
- Joe Blackman (born 1984), British entrepreneur
- Joe Craft (born 1950), American businessman
- Joe Exotic (born 1963), American businessman and media personality
- Joe Glaser, American artist manager known for his involvement in the careers of jazz musicians
- Joe Stecher (attorney), American attorney

=== Coaches and managers ===
- Joe Maddon (born 1954), American baseball manager
- Joe Pasternack (born 1977), American basketball coach
- Joe Whitt Jr. (born 1978), American football coach

=== Criminals and victims ===
- Joe Campisi, American mobster
- Joe Cinque (died 1997), Australian murder victim
- Joe Civello, American mobster
- Joe Michael Ervin (1951–1981), American serial killer
- Joe "Pegleg" Morgan (1929–1993), American fugitive
- Joe Saenz (born 1975), American fugitive

=== Entertainers ===
- Joe Borowski (baseball) (born 1971), American sports broadcaster and former baseball pitcher
- Joe Buck (born 1969), American sports announcer
- Joe Carnahan (born 1969), American film director, screenwriter, and producer
- Joe Gatto, American comedian, actor and producer, former member of comedy troupe The Tenderloins
- Joe Lynch (director), American film and music video director
- Joe McConnell (1939–2018), American sports announcer
- Joe Pera, American comedian
- Joe Piscopo, American comedian and actor
- Joe Rogan (born 1967), American podcaster and comedian
- Joe Santagato (born 1992), American entertainer
- Joe Tait (1937–2021), American sports broadcaster

=== Educators ===
- Joseph "Joe" Beech (1867–1954), American Methodist missionary and educator

=== Musicians ===
- Joe Black (drag queen) (born 1989), British musician and drag queen
- Joe Bruce (born 1972) American member of rap duo Insane Clown Posse
- Joe Budden (born 1980), American rapper
- Joe Cocker (1944–2014), British singer
- Joe Dassin (1938–1980), French singer
- Joe Egan (musician) (born 1946), Scottish musician
- Joe Hahn, American musician
- Joe Hawley (born 1982), guitarist for the band Tally Hall
- Joe "Mr Piano" Henderson (1920–1980), Scottish pianist, composer and broadcaster
- Joe Hisaishi (born 1950), Japanese composer and musical director
- Joe Lala (1947–2014), American musician, founding member of the rock band Blues Image
- Joe Jonas, American musician
- Joe McElderry (born 1991), British singer
- Joe Penna (born 1987), Brazilian musician and filmmaker
- Joe Perry (musician) (born 1950), stage name of American musician Anthony Joseph Pereira
- Joe Raposo, American music composer
- Blind Joe Reynolds (1900 or 1904–1968), American singer-songwriter and blues guitarist
- Joe Strummer (born 1952), British musician
- Blind Joe Taggart (1892–1961), American country blues and gospel singer and guitarist
- Joe Trohman (born 1984), American guitarist, singer, and record producer
- Joe Venuti (1903–1978), American jazz musician and pioneer jazz percussionist
- Joe Walsh (born 1947), American rock guitarist, singer, and songwriter
- Joe Satriani (born 1956), American guitarist

=== Politicians, political relatives, and activists ===
- Joe Anglin, American-born Canadian politician
- Joe Arpaio (born 1932), American law enforcement officer and politician
- Joe Biden (born 1942), 46th president of the United States (2021–2025); 47th vice president of the United States (2009–2017); U.S. senator from Delaware (1973–2009)
- Joseph "Joe" Biden Sr. (1915–2002), father of the above
- Joe Borowski (politician) (1933–1996), Canadian politician
- Joe Clark (born 1939), 16th Prime Minister of Canada 1979–1980
- Joe Costello (politician) (born 1945), Irish politician
- Joe Courtney (politician) (born 1953), American politician
- Joe Ganim (born 1959), American politician
- Joe Giglio (born 1967/8), Maltese politician
- Joe Clint Jenkins (1895–1959), American politician
- Joseph "Joe" P. Kennedy Jr. (1915–1944), American naval aviator, son of the below
- Joseph "Joe" P. Kennedy Sr. (1888–1969), American businessman and politician, father of US President John F. Kennedy
- Joe Kennedy III (born 1980), American lawyer and politician from Massachusetts
- Joe Kuli, Papua New Guinean politician
- Joe Lieberman (1942–2024), American politician
- Joe Manchin (born 1947), American politician
- Joe Peschisolido (born 1963), Canadian lawyer and politician
- Joe the Plumber, American conservative activist and commentator Samuel Joseph Wurzelbacher (born 1973)
- Peg Leg Joe, legendary sailor and underground railroad conductor whose existence is disputed

=== Multiple people with the same last name ===
- Joe Amato (disambiguation), several people
- Joe Becker (disambiguation), several people
- Joe Brown (disambiguation), several people
- Joe Coleman (disambiguation), several people
- Joe Connor (disambiguation), several people
- Joe Davis (disambiguation), several people
- Joe Dawson (disambiguation), several people
- Joe Esposito (disambiguation), several people
- Joe Farrell (disambiguation), several people
- Joe Harris (disambiguation), several people
- Joe Jackson (disambiguation), several people
- Joe Johnson (disambiguation), several people
- Joe Jones (disambiguation), several people
- Joe Kelly (disambiguation), several people
- Joe Louis (disambiguation), several people
- Joe O'Donnell (disambiguation), several people
- Joe Martin (disambiguation), several people
- Joe Murphy (disambiguation), several people
- Joe Quinn (disambiguation), several people
- Joe Reed (disambiguation), several people
- Joe Riley (disambiguation), several people
- Joe Roberts (disambiguation), several people
- Joe Thomas (disambiguation), several people
- Joe Turner (disambiguation), several people
- Joe Williams (disambiguation), several people

== Persons with the middle name ==
- Danny Joe Brown (1951–2005), American singer, member of the Southern rock band Molly Hatchet
- Billy Joe Royal (1942–2015), American singer
- Tommy Joe Martins (born 1986), American racing driver
- Tony Joe White (1943–2018), American singer-songwriter
- Joe Gliniewicz, corrupt cop and army officer who staged his murder; it was actually suicide

== Fictional characters ==
=== Mononymous ===
- KD6-3.7, nicknamed "Joe", the protagonist of Blade Runner 2049
- Joe (Centuria), member of the Accursed Battalion in the Japanese web manga Centuria
- Joe, the nickname of the Man with No Name, from A Fistful of Dollars
- Glass Joe, a fictional French boxer from the Punch-Out!! series
- Joe, a supporting antagonist in the video game Red Dead Redemption 2
- Joe, a video games character from first Street Fighter
- Banana Joe, in Cartoon Network's series The Amazing World of Gumball
- Joe, a character in the 1986 American fantasy drama film The Boy Who Could Fly
- Joe, a character in the 1947 American drama movie The Return of Rin Tin Tin

=== With surname ===
- Joe "Admin" Administration, a support character from Malice@Doll anime
- Joe Baker, a character in the Canadian-American martial arts 1995 movie Law of the Jungle
- Joe Barker, a character in the 1986 TV action movie The Gladiator
- Joe Bruin, the official mascot of the University of California, Los Angeles
- Joe Burns, Steve's brother and the main protagonist and host of Blue's Clues from Season 5 and onward
- "Honest Joe" Costello, the Mayor of New York in the 2023 comic book series Nemesis Reloaded
- Judge Joe Dredd, British comics character
- Joe Gibken, a main character in Japanese series Kaizoku Sentai Gokaiger
- Joe Gipp, a character in the 1987 American teen comedy film Adventures in Babysitting
- Joe Goldberg, main character of the psychological thriller novel and television series You
- Joe Higashi, in the video game Fatal Fury
- Joe Isuzu, a fictional spokesperson in Isuzu commercials
- Joe Jitsu, Beano comics character
- Joe Jitsu, a character from UPA's Dick Tracy cartoon
- Joe Kido, A Main Character In Digimon Adventure
- Joe MacMillan, main character in Halt and Catch Fire
- Joe McClaine, protagonist of Joe 90, a 1968 British television series
- Joe Lynch, on the Australian soap opera Home and Away
- Joe Sparkes, a supporting character in the animated series Fireman Sam
- Joe Swanson, a recurring character in the animated series Family Guy
- Joe Vega (simply refers as "JV"), a character from the video game Need for Speed: Most Wanted
- Joe Wallace, character on the television series EastEnders
- Karate Joe, from the Rhythm Heaven video game series
- Joe, a character featured in Act II: The Father of Death, the second studio album by the band the Protomen

== See also ==
- Jo (given name)
- Joe Bush (ghost), American legend
- Joe Shmoe, a placeholder name
