= Đokić =

Đokić (Serbian Cyrillic: Ђокић; also transliterated Djokić) is a Serbian surname, derived from the male given name "Đoka"/"Đoko", itself a diminutive of Đorđe (George). It is predominantly found in Serbia, Montenegro and Bosnia and Herzegovina. Its form in romanized Macedonian is Ǵokić or Gjokić. It may refer to:

- Aleksandar Đokić (1936–2002), Serbian architect
- Ana Đokić, former Montenegrin handball player
- Boško Đokić, Serbian professional basketball coach and journalist
- Branimir Đokić, Serbian folk accordionist
- Denise Djokic, Canadian cellist
- Dušan Đokić, Serbian footballer
- Georgije Đokić, retired Serbian Orthodox bishop
- Igor Đokić (born 1979), Serbian football midfielder
- Jadranka Đokić, Croatian actress
- Jasmina Đokić, Serbian painter
- Jovan Đokić, Serbian football midfielder
- Lazar Đokić, Montenegrin football attacker
- Ljubisav Đokić (1943-2020), bulldozer operator who became a symbol of the overthrow of Slobodan Milošević
- Milan Đokić (politician) (born 1972), Serbian politician
- Miroslav Ǵokić (born 1973), former Macedonian international footballer
- Momčilo Đokić, Serbian football player and manager
- Oliver Đokić (born 1981), Serbian football midfielder
- Philippe Djokic, Canadian violinist, conductor and music educator
- Rade Đokić, Bosnian Serb footballer
- Ratko Đokić, Yugoslav mob boss in Sweden
- Vladan Đokić, Serbian architect
- Vladimir Đokić, Serbian professional basketball coach and former player
- Željko Đokić, Serbian-born Bosnian-Herzegovinian footballer
- Zvonimir Đokić (born 1960), Serbian politician
- Đokić brotherhood of the Vasojevići tribe.
- Šop-Đokić (Serbian Cyrillic: Шоп-Ђокић), a Serbian family from Leskovac

== See also ==
- Đokići, a town in Serbia
- Đoković, a surname
- Đokanović, a surname
- Dokić, a surname
- Jokić, a surname
