= Đoković =

Đoković (Serbian Cyrillic: Ђоковић, pronounced [dʑôːkoʋitɕ]; simplified Serbian Latin: Djoković; also transliterated Djokovic or Djokovich) is a Serbian surname, derived from the male given name Đoka (Ђока)/Đoko (Ђоко)", itself a diminutive of the name Đorđe (Ђорђе; George in English). Notable people with the surname include:

- Djordje Djokovic (born 1995), Serbian former tennis player, brother of Novak
- Marko Djokovic (born 1991), Serbian former tennis player, brother of Novak
- Novak Djokovic (born 1987), Serbian tennis player
- Srdjan Djokovic (born 1961), Serbian entrepreneur and former skier and ski coach, Novak's father
- Bob Djokovich (born 1956), American former handball player
- Aleksandar Đoković (born 1991), Serbian footballer
- Damjan Đoković (born 1990), Croatian footballer
- Eleonora Vild Đoković, birth name of Eleonora Vild (born 1969), Serbian former basketball player
- Hasim Đoković (born 1974), Montenegrin former footballer
- Ilija Đoković (born 1996), Serbian basketball player
- Ivan Đoković (born 1982), Serbian former footballer
- Jasna Đoković (born 1991), Montenegrin footballer
- Ljubiša Đoković (born 1960), Serbian politician
- Olga Đoković (born 1945), Serbian and Yugoslavian former basketball player
- Radovan Đoković (born 1996), Serbian basketball player
- Veselin Đoković (born 1976), Serbian former footballer

== See also ==
- Đokić
- Joković
- DJO
- Sladana Dokovic (born 1995), Swiss handballer
