= Đukić =

Đukić (Serbian Cyrillic: Ђукић; also transliterated Djukić) is a Serbian surname, derived from the male given name "Đuka", itself a diminutive of Đorđe (George). It is predominantly used as a surname in Serbia and Montenegro. It may refer to:

== Notable people ==
- Aleksandar Đukić (born 1980), Serbian footballer
- Budimir Đukić (born 1977), Serbian footballer
- Darko Đukić (born 1994), Serbian handball player
- Dragan Đukić (born 1987), Swiss footballer
- Dragan Đukić (born 1962), Serbian handball coach
- Duško Dukić (born 1986), Serbian footballer
- Filip Đukić (born 1999), Montenegrin footballer
- Goran Đukić (born 1970), Bosnian footballer
- Ilija Đukić (1930–2002), Serbian diplomat, former foreign minister of Yugoslavia
- Milan Đukić (1947–2007), Croatian Serb politician
- Milan Đukić (Vojvodina politician) (born 1975), Serbian politician
- Milan Đukić (born 1985), Serbian handball player
- Milonja Đukić (born 1965), former Yugoslav and Montenegrin football player
- Miroslav Đukić (born 1966), former football player and former Serbia national team manager
- Slađan Đukić (born 1966), Serbian footballer
- Slavica Đukić (born 1960), Austrian-Yugoslav handball player
- Slavica Đukić Dejanović (born 1951), Serbian politician
- Svetomir Đukić (1882–1960), founder of Olympic Committee of Serbia, officer in Serbian Army, general in Chetnik movement
- Vladislav Đukić (born 1962), Serbian footballer
- Zvonimir Đukić, member of the band Van Gogh

== Other ==
- Đukić, a brotherhood of the Vasojevići

== See also ==
- Đukanović
- Đokić
- Jukić
