= Đukanović =

Ðukanović (Montenegrin and Serbian Cyrillic: Ђукановић; also transliterated Djukanović) is a Serbo-Croatian surname. It is derived from the male given name "Đuka"/"Đukan", itself a variant of the name Đorđe (George). It is predominantly found in Serbia and Montenegro. It may refer to:

- Aco Đukanović (born 1965), Montenegrin businessman, brother of Milo
- Blažo Đukanović (1883–1943), Chetnik general and Montenegrin political leader
- Branislav Đukanović (born 1959), Montenegrin football player and manager
- Dragan Đukanović (born 1969), Montenegrin football player and manager
- Đukan Đukanović (born 1992), Serbian basketball player
- Goran Đukanović (born 1976), Montenegrin handball player
- Milo Đukanović (born 1962), Montenegrin politician, President
- Milutin Đukanović (born 1991), Montenegrin basketball player
- Slaviša Đukanović (born 1979), Serbian handball player
- Srđan Đukanović (born 1980), Serbian footballer
- Viktor Đukanović (born 2004), Montenegrin football player
- Vladimir Đukanović (born 1979), Serbian politician, lawyer and talk show host

== See also ==
- Đukić
- Đokanović
