= Jo (given name) =

Given name

Jo is a given name, often a short form (hypocorism) of Joanna, Joanne, Joseph, Josephine, George, etc. Notable people with the name include:

== Men ==
- Jô (born 1987), Brazilian footballer, João Alves de Assis Silva
- Jô (footballer, born 1988), Brazilian footballer, Josiel Alves de Oliveira
- Jô (footballer, born 1992), Brazilian footballer, Jonatas Figueira Fernandes
- Jo Arai (born 1998), Japanese mixed martial artist
- Jo Jo Benson (1938–2014), stage name of Joseph M. Hewell, American R&B and soul singer
- Jo Inge Berget (born 1990), Norwegian footballer
- Jô Bilac (born 1985), Brazilian playwright
- Jo Bogaert (born 1956), Flemish musician and producer
- Jo Bonfrère (born 1946), Dutch football player and coach
- Jo Bonnier (1930–1972), Swedish racing driver
- Jo van den Broek (1898–1978), Dutch architect
- Jo Callis (born 1951), British guitarist, notably with The Human League
- Jo Cals (1914–1971), Dutch Prime Minister
- Jo Coenen (born 1949), Dutch architect
- Jo Colruyt (1928–1994), Belgian businessman
- Jo Cornu (born 1944), Belgian business executive
- Jo Gartner (1954–1986), Austrian racing driver
- Jo van Gastel (1887–1969), Dutch archer
- Jo Grimond (1913–1993), British politician
- Jo de Haan (1936–2006), Dutch cyclist
- Jo Ishiwatari (石渡 譲; born 1967), Japanese actor
- Jo Johnson (born 1971), British politician, Minister of State for Transport
- Jo Jones (1911–1965), American jazz drummer
- Jo Kanazawa (金沢 浄; born 1976), Japanese footballer
- Jo Kondo (近藤 譲; born 1947), Japanese composer and conductor
- Jo Leinen (born 1948), German politician and MEP
- Jo Maas (born 1954), Dutch racing cyclist
- Jo Meynen (1901–1980), Dutch Ministers of Defence
- Jo Nesbø (born 1960), Norwegian writer, musician, former economist and reporter
- Jo van Nunen (1945–2010), Dutch engineer and management consultant
- Jo Planckaert (born 1970), Belgian cyclist
- Jo Privat (1919–1996), French accordionist and composer.
- Jo Ritzen (born 1945), Dutch economist and social-democratic politician
- Jo de Roo (born 1937), Dutch cyclist
- Jô Santos (born 1991), Brazilian footballer, Joálisson Santos Oliveira
- Jo Schlesser (1928–1968), French racing driver
- Jo Siffert (1936–1971), Swiss racing driver
- Jô Soares (1938–2022), Brazilian comedian, talk show host, author and musician
- Jo Spier (1900–1978), Dutch artist and illustrator
- Jo Vandeurzen (born 1958), Belgian politician, Flemish Minister of Public Health
- Jo Vonlanthen (born 1942), Swiss racing driver
- Jo Voskuil (1897–1972), Dutch painter, illustrator, and bookbinder
- Jo Weil (born 1977), German actor

== Women ==
- Jo Aleh (born 1986), New Zealand sailor, national, world and Olympic champion
- Jo van Ammers-Küller (1884–1966), Dutch writer
- Jo Ankier (born 1982), British record holder (1,500-m & 3,000-m steeplechase)
- Jo Archbold, model
- Jo Armstead (born 1944), American singer-songwriter
- Jo Bauer-Stumpff (1873–1964), Dutch painter
- Jo Bench, English bassist, formerly of Bolt Thrower
- Jo Brand (born 1957), English comedian, writer and actress
- Jo Ann Campbell (born 1938), American singer
- Jo Coburn (born 1968), BBC political correspondent
- Jo Cox (1974–2016), British politician
- Jo Cox-Ladru (1923–?), Dutch Olympic gymnast
- Damita Jo DeBlanc (1930–1998), aka Damita Jo, American actress and singer
- Jo Durie (born 1960), English tennis player
- Jo Ellis (born 1983), English field hockey forward
- Jo Freeman (born 1945), American feminist and political scientist
- Jo Frost (born 1970), English nanny, writer and TV hostess
- Jo Harshbarger (born 1956), American swimmer
- Jo Kiesanowski (born 1979), New Zealand cyclist
- Jo Lemaire (born 1956), Belgian singer
- Jo Muir (born 1994), British modern pentathlete
- Jo O'Meara (born 1979), English singer (S Club 7)
- Jo Pavey (born 1973), British Olympian and distance runner
- Jo Price (born 1985), Welsh rugby union player and former footballer
- J. K. Rowling (born 1965), author of the Harry Potter book series
- Jo Ann Robinson (1912–1990), American civil rights activist
- Jo Schouwenaar-Franssen (1909–1995), Dutch government minister
- Billie Jo Spears (1937–2011), American country music singer
- Jo Squillo (born 1962), Italian singer and TV presenter
- Jo Stafford (1917–2008), American singer of traditional pop music
- Jo Van Fleet (1915–1996), American theatre and film actress
- Jo Walton (born 1964), Welsh-Canadian fantasy and science fiction writer and poet
- Jo Bailey Wells (born 1965), British Anglican bishop, Bishop of Dorking
- Jo Whiley (born 1965) British broadcaster and DJ
- Jo Zayner (born 1981), CRISPR engineer

== Fictional characters ==
- Jo Bennett, former CEO of Sabre in the TV show The Office
- Joanne Gardner, lead character from the soap opera Search for Tomorrow
- Jo Grant, a 1971–1973 Dr. Who companion
- Jo Kido, in the anime series Digimon Adventure
- Jo Hammet, main character of the edutainment game JumpStart Adventures 5th Grade: Jo Hammet, Kid Detective
- Jo March, in the novel Little Women and its sequels
- Jo Martinez, in the supernatural crime drama series Forever
- Dr. Jo Harding, main character in the movie Twister
- Jo Masters, in the British television series The Bill
- Jo Masterson, in ABC Family's Twisted
- Josephine "Jo" McCormick, one of the main characters of the TV series Big Bad Beetleborgs
- Jo Polniaczek, from the TV show The Facts of Life
- Jo Reynolds, in Melrose Place
- Jo Saint-Clair, title character of the French TV series Jo
- Jo Stockton, one of the main characters of the movie Funny Face
- Jo, one of the main characters of anime series Burst Angel
- Jo, a crossing sweeper in Charles Dickens's novel Bleak House
- Jo, a contestant on Total Drama: Revenge of the Island
- Jo Wilson, from ABC's show Grey's Anatomy
- Jo, main character from A Taste of Honey
- Jo, nonbinary bird from Angry Birds introduced in 2023

== See also ==
- Joseph Joestar
- Joanne (given name)
- Joanna
- Johanna
- Joe (given name)
- Jordan (name)
- Joseph
- Johan (given name)
- Djo, some uses pronounced "Jo"
- George (given name)
- Mary Jo
