= Joseph Martin =

Joseph Martin may refer to:

== Military ==
- Joseph Martin (general) (1740–1808), American Revolutionary War general from Virginia
- Joseph Plumb Martin (1760–1850), American soldier and memoir writer
- Joseph M. Martin (born 1962), U.S. Army officer

== Politicians ==
- Joseph Martin (MP for Ipswich) (1649–1729), English MP for Ipswich in 1701
- Joseph Martin (1726–1776), British banker and politician
- Joseph John Martin (1833–1900), U.S. Congressman from North Carolina
- Joseph Martin (Australian politician) (1898–1940), member of the New South Wales Legislative Council
- Joseph Martin (Canadian politician) (1852–1923), lawyer and politician known as "Fighting Joe"
- Joseph R. Martin (1926–2008), Canadian politician in the Legislative Assembly of New Brunswick
- Joseph W. Martin Jr. (1884–1968), Speaker of the U.S. House
- Joseph Martin (Wisconsin politician) (1878–1946), Wisconsin State Assemblyman
- Joseph A. Martin (1888–1928), mayor of Detroit, Michigan in 1924
- J. C. Martin (Texas politician) (1913–1998), mayor of Laredo, Texas
- Joseph C. Martin, mayor of Erie, Pennsylvania (1948–1949)
- Joseph Martin (Maine politician), state senator elected in 2024
- Joseph Martin (Welsh politician), MS elected in 2026

== Religion ==
- Joseph-Marie Martin (1891–1976), French prelate of the Roman Catholic Church
- Joseph Martin (bishop) (1903–1982), Bishop of Ngozi and Bururi in Burundi
- Joseph Martin (speaker) (1924–2009), Roman Catholic priest, speaker on the issues of alcoholism and drug addiction

== Others ==
- Joseph Martin (gardener) (fl. 1788–1826), Enlightenment gardener-botanist and plant collector
- Joseph Martin (rapist) (1869–1887), convicted rapist from the Mount Rennie rape case
- Joseph Martin (reporter) (1915–1981), journalist and Pulitzer Prize-winner
- Lock Martin (1916–1959), 7-foot-plus US actor
- Joseph B. Martin (born 1938), professor of neurobiology
- Joseph Martin (arts administrator), National Gallery of Canada director
- J. C. Martin (baseball) (Joseph Clifton Martin, born 1936), Major League Baseball player
- Joseph Martin (explorer) (1848–1892), French geologist, topographer and explorer
- Joseph Martin (DC Comics), fictional character known as the Atomic Skull
- Joseph D. Martin, American historian of science and technology

== See also ==
- Joe Martin (disambiguation)
- Joey Martin (disambiguation)
- Martyn Joseph (born 1960), Welsh singer-songwriter
