= Victor Quesada =

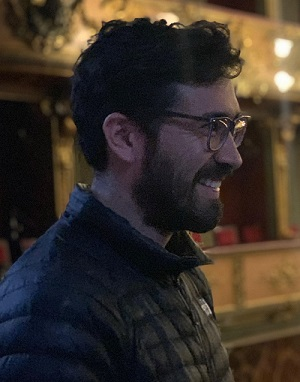
- Born: April 28, 1985; Ibagué, Colombia
- Writing career
- Language: Spanish

Victor Quesada (born in Ibagué, April 28, 1985) is a Colombian theatre director, playwright and writer.

== Life ==
He was educated at the Pontifical Javeriana University of Bogotà, Colombia, where he got a bachelor's degree in Political Science in 2007, followed by a MA in Theatre Directing at the University of Essex, England, in 2009. He attended and did significant work at GITIS in Moscow and at Odin Teatret in Denmark, he also worked with the Malayerba Group in Ecuador, with the playwright Jô Bilac in Brazil, with Lluis Pasqual in the Lliure in Barcelona and with Miguel de Arco in Kamikaze Producciones in Madrid.

== Awards ==
- the Biennial Award for Artistic Creation Javeriana's University in 2018
- Award for directors with trajectory of IDARTES in 2017
- Residencia en Arte Dramático from IDARTES in 2015
- Impulso Pasantías Internacionales from the Ministry of Culture in 2012
- Jóvenes creadores from the Ministry of Culture of Colombia in 2011
- Jóvenes Talentosfrom in Icetex 2010

== Work experience ==
=== Directing ===
- Rojas by Laura Calderón. Seki Sano Theatre. Bogota. March 2019.
- El Perro del Hortelano by Lope de Vega. Colón Theatre. Bogota. December, 2018.
- El puesto by César Betancur produced by Dago García with César Mora. Patria Theatre. Bogota. September, 2018.
- 4.48 Psicosis by Sarah Kane. Javeriana's Theatre. Bogota. June, 2018.
- El verbo placer by Flavia Dos Santos and César Betancur. Patria Theater. April, 2018.
- La Noche Árabe by Roland Schimmelpfennig. National Theatre. Bogota. October, 2017.
- Me ericé by César Betancur with Amparo Grisales . Patria Theatre. Bogota. October, 2017.
- Juicio a una Zorra by Miguel del Arco. Sala Uno Theatre. Bogota. May, 2017.
- La piedra oscura by Alberto Conejero. Sala Uno Theatre. Bogota. October, 2016.
- Hay un Complot I-II by César Betancur with Andrea Guzmán. National Theatre. Bogota.March, 2016.
- El inspector by Nikolai Gogol. National Theatre. Bogota. June, 2015.
- Ni muerta dejo de vivir by and with Andrea Guzmán. Bogota. September, 2015.
- El Avaro by Molière with Natalia_Reyes. National Theatre. Bogota. January, 2015
- Cállate y Escribe by César Betancur with Andrea Guzmán. Astor Plaza Theatre. Bogota. December, 2014.
- The Beauty Queen of Leenane by Martin McDonagh. Clifftown Youth Theatre. London. December, 2009

=== Playwriting and directing ===
- Las mujeres de Lorca. Julio Mario Santodomingo and Colón Theatre. Bogota. October 2018/March 2019.
- Viva inspired by Pablo Picasso. National Theatre. Co-written with Denise Hergett. Bogota. January, 2018.
- Güerfanitos. National Theatre. Bogota. March, 2015.
- Voz. National Theatre. Bogota. April, 2014.
- Apesta. Site Specific. Bogota. April, 2012.
- Anónimos. Garage Theatre. Bogota. December, 2011.

=== Screenwriting and directing ===
- Closures. Short Film. Estudio Babel. 2018.
- El verbo placer. TV Commercial. CARACOL TV. 2018.
- Me ericé. TV Commercial. CARACOL TV. 2017
- Lives in sight. Soap Opera. Chapters: 9, 14, 22, 26, 32, 34, 40, 41 and 47. RCN TV. 2015

=== Dramatic work published ===
- Cada primero de Noviembre (Every first of November). Chaos in nine letters. V Dramaturgy Clinic. Editorial UD. ISBN 978-958-8972-99-2. Bogota. April, 2017.
- Apesta (Stink Out). Colombian Theatre Collection Publisher UD. Nº. XLVII. ISBN 9789585434066. Bogota. April, 2017.
- Voz (Voice). Contemporary Colombian dramaturgy. Anthology II. Compilation: Marina Lamus. Publisher Paso de Gato. ISBN 978-607-8092-61-1. México. August, 2013.
