= Jokanović =

Jokanović (Serbian Cyrillic: Јокановић) is a Serbian surname, a patronymic derived from given name Jokan. Notable people with the surname include:

- Predrag Jokanović (born 1968), Serbian football player
- Rajko Jokanović (born 1971), Serbian volleyball player
- Slaviša Jokanović (born 1968), Serbian footballer and coach of Sheffield United.

== See also ==
- Jokanovića kuća, heritage site in Užice
- Joković, surname
- Jokić, surname
