= Jukić =

Jukić (anglicized as Jukic) is a Croatian surname, a patronymic, derived from Juko, itself a diminutive of Juraj. It is the second most common surname in the Split-Dalmatia County of Croatia.

Notable people with the surname include:

- Andrija Jukic (born 1987), Australian footballer
- Darko Jukić (born 1990), Danish basketballer
- Dinko Jukić (born 1989), Croatian-born Austrian swimmer
- Elmir Jukić (born 1971), Bosnian film director
- Ivan Jukić (footballer)
- Ivan Jukić (rower)
- Ivan Jukić (water polo)
- Ivan Franjo Jukić (1818–1857), Bosnian writer and Franciscan frier
- Ivo Jukić (born 1986), Croatian futsal player
- Jorge Jukich (born 1943), Uruguayan former cyclist
- Katarina Jukic (born 1989), Australian footballer
- Mirna Jukić (born 1986), Austrian swimmer of Croatian origin
- Paškal Jukić (1748–1806), Croatian preacher, musician, and professor of philosophy
- Stjepan Jukić (born 1979), Croatian footballer
- Vince Jukic (born 1980), Australian drummer
- Zarko Jukic (born 1993), Danish basketballer

== See also ==
- Jokić
- Đukić
