= Petar Jokić =

Petar Jokić may refer to:

- Petar Jokić (revolutionary) (c. 1779 – 1852), Serbian revolutionary
- Petar Jokić (basketball) (born 1991), Serbian basketball player
