= Jokić =

Jokić (pronounced [jǒkitɕ]; Serbian Cyrillic: Јокић) is a Serbian surname, a patronymic derived from Joko, itself a diminutive of masculine given name Jokan. Notable people with the surname include:

- Bojan Jokić (born 1986), Slovenian footballer
- Dallas Jokic, American voice actor
- Đorđe Jokić (born 1981), Serbian footballer
- Ljubiša Jokić (born 1958), Serbian former general
- Marko Jokić (born 1999), Croatian footballer who played for NK Zagreb and NK Rudes
- Mihailo Jokić (born 1948), Serbian educator and politician
- Milan Jokić (born 1995), Serbian football midfielder
- Miloš Jokić (born 1987), Serbian footballer
- Miodrag Jokić (1935–2022), the last commander of the Yugoslav Navy
- Nikola Jokić (born 1995), Serbian basketball player
- Petar Jokić (revolutionary) (c. 1779 – 1852), Serbian revolutionary
- Petar Jokić (basketball) (born 1991), Serbian basketball player
- Predrag Jokić (born 1983), Montenegrin water polo player

== See also ==
- Joković
- Jokanović
- Jukić
- Đokić
