= Joseph Murphy =

Joseph Murphy may refer to:

== Politicians ==
- Joseph Murphy (Irish politician), Irish independent politician who represented Dublin County, 1927–32
- Joseph Richard Murphy (1880–1944), Canadian politician
- Joseph Warner Murphy (1892–1977), Canadian Member of Parliament
- Joseph P. Murphy (1899–?), American politician, Wisconsin State Assemblyman
- Joseph L. Murphy (1907–1973), American politician in Massachusetts
- Joseph C. Murphy (1907–1987), American politician, Michigan State Representative

== Sportsmen ==
- Joe Murphy (baseball) (1866–1951), pitcher in Major League Baseball
- Joe Murphy (footballer, born 1873) (1873–?), English football player for Hibernian, Stoke City, Arsenal and Raith Rovers
- Joe Murphy (American football) (1897–1940), Texas A&M University–Commerce head football coach
- Joe Murphy (Australian footballer) (1931–1985), Australian rules footballer
- Joe Murphy (hurler) (1947–2009), Irish hurler
- Joe Murphy (ice hockey) (born 1967), Canadian ice hockey player
- Joseph Murphy (equestrian) (born 1976), Irish equestrian
- Joe Murphy (footballer, born 1981), Irish football player for Tranmere Rovers, Scunthorpe United and Coventry City

== Others ==
- Joseph Murphy (author) (1898–1981), author and lecturer on the subconscious
- Joseph Anthony Murphy (1857–1939), Roman Catholic bishop in Belize
- Joseph F. Murphy Jr. (1944–2022), American lawyer and jurist from Maryland
- Joe Murphy (actor) (1877–1961), American actor "The Gumps" etc
- Joseph S. Murphy (1933–1998), American President of Queens College, President of Bennington College, and Chancellor of the City University of New York
- Joseph T. Murphy (1910–1992), American lawyer and judge from Philadelphia
- Joe Murphy (inventor) (1923–2001), Irish businessman, inventor and founder of Tayto
- Joe Murphy (Irish republican) (1895–1920), hunger striker
- Joey Murphy, American screenwriter and producer
- Joseph Murphy (priest) (born 1968), Head of Protocol at the Holy See's Secretariat of State
- Joe Murphy (contractor) (1917–2000), Irish civil engineering contractor
- Joe Murphy (journalist) (born 1964 or 1965), British retired journalist
