= Democratic Party of Federalists =

Democratic Party of Federalists Демократска странка федералиста Demokratska stranka federalista
- Leader: Dragan Đokanović
- Founded: 2 May 1990
- Headquarters: City of East Sarajevo
- Ideology: Democracy; Federalism; Pro-Europeanism
- Ethnic group: Serb

Website
- www.dsf-eu.com

The Democratic Party of Federalists (Serbian: Demokratska stranka federalista, Serbian Cyrillic: Демократска Странка Федералиста) is political party in Bosnia and Herzegovina. It was founded in Sarajevo 2 May 1990 by Dragan Đokanović.

Dragan Đokanović established the party in Belgrade, Serbia and he serves as its president. The party was officially registered in 2003. The headquarters of Democratic Party of Federalists, is located in City of East Sarajevo since 2010.

The Democratic Party of Federalists has participated in the proclamation of the Republic of Srpska and has participated in creating the institutions of the Republic of Srpska.

Đokanović was in the Presidency of the Republic of Srpska and he was a member of the Republic of Srpska Government.

Democratic Party of Federalists has left the alliance with Karadžić's Serbian Democratic Party for violation of the Geneva Conventions and the Constitution of the Republic of Srpska by the majority of Serbian Democratic Party.
