= Joseph Martin (arts administrator) =

Canadian arts administrator (1922–2003)

Joseph Martin (1922–2003) was a Canadian arts administrator.

Formerly the assistant of Jean Sutherland Boggs, after the departure of Hsio-yen Shih in 1981, Joseph Martin was named the acting director of the National Gallery of Canada from 1981 to 1983. He was named the institution's formal director in August 1983, maintaining the role until 1987, when he resigned, citing health reasons. During his tenure the gallery worked with Canada Museums Construction Corporation, headed by chairman Jean Sutherland Boggs, to coordinate the design of the new gallery building on Sussex Drive. In 1986, Martin opened the TD Gallery of Inuit Art in Toronto that housed a 1,000 piece collection of Inuit prints and sculptures.
