= Il Regio Dalmata – Kraglski Dalmatin =

Bilingual weekly newspaper

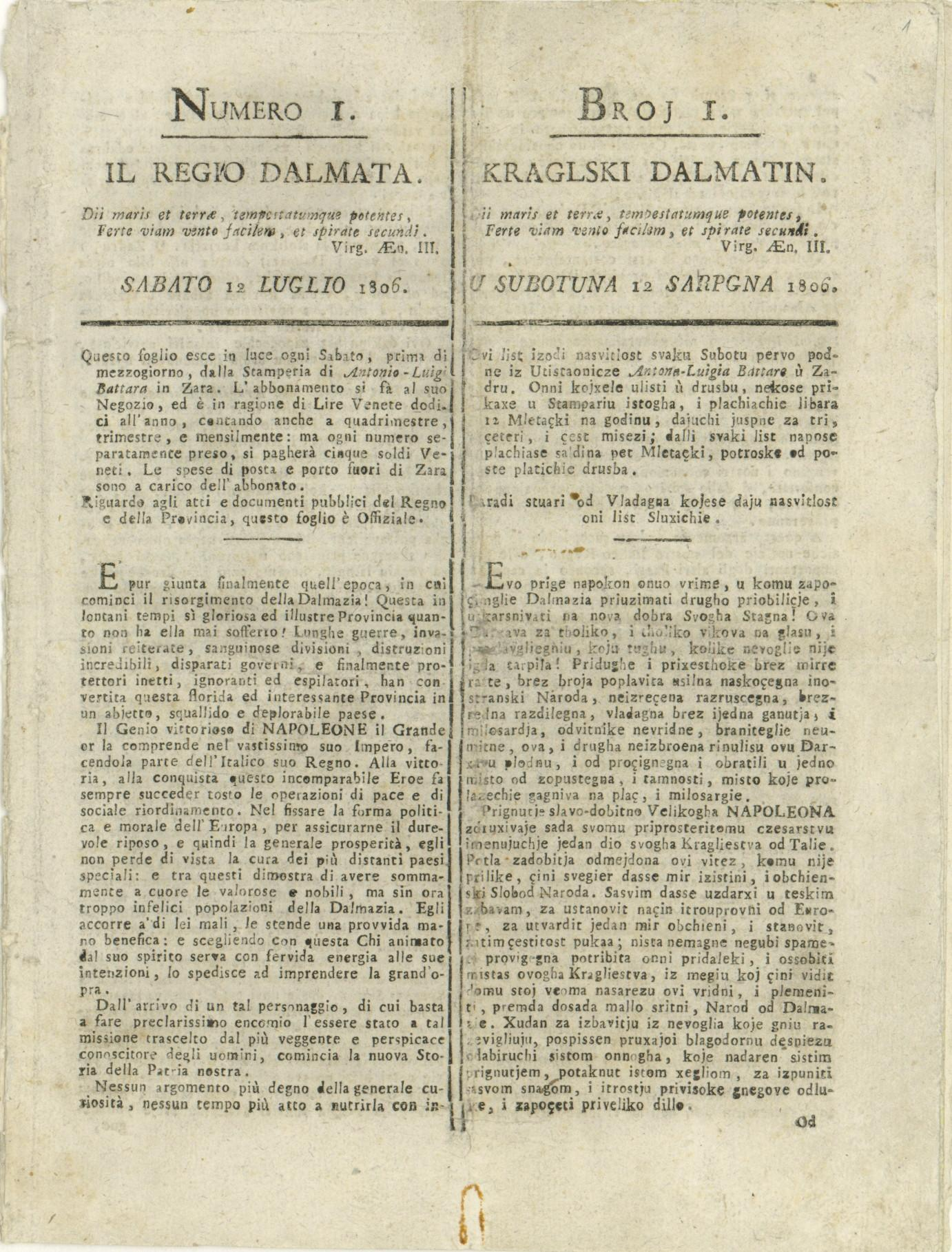
- Front page of the first issue, dated 12 July 1806
- Type: Weekly newspaper
- Founded: 12 July 1806
- Ceased publication: 1 April 1810
- Language: Italian and Croatian
- City: Zadar
- Circulation: 600

Il Regio Dalmata – Kraglski Dalmatin (also Kraljski Dalmatin) was a bilingual weekly newspaper, written in Italian and Croatian, which was published in Zadar by the French government between 1806 and 1810. It was the first newspaper published in Croatian.

== History ==
After the centuries-long rule of the Republic of Venice which ended in 1797, followed by a short period of Austrian government, Dalmatia was ruled by Napoleonic France between 1806 and 1813. In order to promote their government and gain favor with the local population, the French started an official newspaper in Italian and Croatian. The decision to establish Il Regio Dalmata – Kraglski Dalmatin was made by Napoleon Bonaparte.

The newspaper was edited by Bartolomeo Benincasa, Ivan Kreljanović and Nikola Dominik Budrović. Paško Jukić, a Franciscan, translated the articles from Italian to Croatian. After Jukić's death in 1806, Budrović took over the translation duties. The newspaper was printed in Antonio Luigi Battara's printing shop in Zadar.

Il Regio Dalmata – Kraglski Dalmatin was distributed throughout Dalmatia, from the Kvarner Gulf in the north to the Bay of Kotor in the south, including the Adriatic islands. The readers were mostly intellectuals – such as teachers, priests, government officials and military officers – and also some merchants and craftsmen. The newspaper was popular and sought after; the initial circulation of 500 rose to 600 after nine issues, and the publisher soon contemplated printing 1000 copies.

After the Treaty of Schönbrunn and the establishment of the Illyrian Provinces in 1809, the French government decided to discontinue the Zadar-based newspaper in favor of a Ljubljana-based Telegraphe officiel des Provinces Illyriennes. The last issue was published on 1 April 1810. In all, 176 issues were published, comprising a total of 1,420 pages.

== Format and content ==
Il Regio Dalmata – Kraglski Dalmatin had eight two-column pages. The left column was in Italian and the right was in Croatian. Some articles were written only in one of the two languages.

The basic purpose of the newspaper was to represent and promote the French government by publishing its laws, regulations and decrees. The articles covered a wide range of topics: economy, politics, law and legislation, religion, cultural history, education, military, commerce and others. Much attention was paid to health care issues.

== Legacy ==
Although the first monograph dedicated to Il Regio Dalmata – Kraglski Dalmatin was published in 1912, more thorough, multidisciplinary research and scholarship on the topic emerged only since 1989. In 2006, a project aimed at publishing a full, five-volume reprint of Kraglski Dalmatin was started. The fifth and final volume was released in 2011. In 2010, as a part of the Historical Croatian Newspapers project, Kraglski Dalmatin was digitized and made available online by the National and University Library in Zagreb.

== Sources ==
- Brisky, Livia (December 2010). "Zdravstvena problematika grada Splita na stranicama prvih novina pisanih hrvatskim jezikom 'Il Regio Dalmata-Kraglski Dalmatin' (1806.–1810.): u povodu 200. obljetnice prestanka njihova objavljivanja" [Health problems of the City of Split on the pages of the first newspaper written in Croatian 'Il Regio Dalmata-Kraglski Dalmatin' (1806–1810): on the occasion of 200th anniversary of termination of its publication] (PDF). Acta medico-historica Adriatica (in Croatian). 8 (2). Rijeka: Croatian Scientific Society for the History of Health Culture: 275–286.
- Maštrović, Tihomil (April 1997). "Hrvatski preporodni nagovještaji u Zadru krajem XIX. i početkom XX. stoljeća" (PDF). Hvar City Theatre Days (in Croatian). 23 (1): 45–60.
