= Joey Martin =

Joey Martin may refer to:

- Joey Martin (ice hockey) (born 1988), Canadian professional ice hockey player
- Joe Martin, member of the husband and wife duo Joey + Rory
- Jake Martin (All My Children), a fictitious character on the series originally known as Joey Martin

== See also ==
- Joe Martin (disambiguation)
- Joseph Martin (disambiguation)
