= Joković =

Joković (pronounced [jǒkoʋitɕ]; Serbian Cyrillic: Јоковић) is a Serbo-Croatian surname, borne by both ethnic Serbs and Croats. It is a patronymic, derived from Joko, itself a diminutive of masculine given name Jokan. Notable people with the surname include:

- Maro Joković (born 1987), Croatian water polo player
- Mirjana Joković (born 1967), Serbian actress
- Nocko Joković (born 1973), Danish footballer
- Vladimir Joković (born 1967), Montenegrin sports official
- Ana Joković (born 1979), Serbian former basketball player

== See also ==
- Đoković or Djokovic
- Jokić
- Jokanović
