= Joe Martin =

Joe Martin may refer to:

== Entertainment ==
- Joe Martin (bassist), jazz musician
- Joe Martin (cartoonist), American cartoonist
- Joe Martin (writer) (born 1953), playwright, author and theatre director
- Fiddlin' Joe Martin (1900–1975), American blues musician
- Joe Martin, director of the 2016 Hungarian film Keep Quiet
- Joe F. Martin, creator of the role-playing game Recon
- Joe Martin, member of classical singing group Angelis
- Joe Martin (All My Children), character on All My Children
- Joe Martin (orangutan), silent movie animal performer

== Politics ==
- Joseph Martin (Canadian politician) (1852–1923), lawyer and politician known as "Fighting Joe"
- Joseph W. Martin Jr. (1884–1968), speaker of U.S. House of Representatives
- Joe Martin (Welsh politician) (born 1997 or 1998), Senedd member since 2026

== Sports ==
- Joe Martin (outfielder) (1876–1964), American baseball player
- Joe Martin (third baseman) (1911–1960), American baseball player and manager
- Joe E. Martin (1916–1996), American boxing coach
- Joe Martin (Irish footballer) (1931–2023), Irish footballer for Dundalk
- Joe Martin (American football) (born 1983), linebacker for Baltimore Ravens
- Joe Martin (English footballer) (born 1989), English footballer for Northampton Town
- Joe Martin (rugby league) (born 1995), English rugby league footballer

== See also ==
- Joe Martin Stage Race, a cycling stage race held annually in Fayetteville, Arkansas
- Joseph Martin (disambiguation)
- Joey Martin (disambiguation)
