= Joseph Roberts =

Joseph Roberts may refer to:

== Arts and entertainment ==
- Joe Roberts (actor) (1871–1923), American comic actor
- Joe Roberts (artist), American artist
- Joe Roberts (musician), English musician
- Joe Roberts, English actor known for portraying John Webster in Shakespeare in Love

== Sports ==
- Joe Roberts (basketball) (1936–2022), American basketball player
- Joe Roberts (curler), American curler
- Joe Roberts (footballer) (1900–1984), English professional footballer
- Joe Roberts (motorcyclist) (born 1997), American motorcycle racer
- Joe Roberts (rugby union) (born 2000), Welsh rugby union player

== Others ==
- Joseph Jenkins Roberts (1809–1876), 1st and 7th President of Liberia
- Joseph J. Roberts (born 1952), Speaker of the New Jersey General Assembly
- Joseph Roberts (motivational speaker) (born 1966), Canadian motivational speaker and author
