= Banjo Pier =

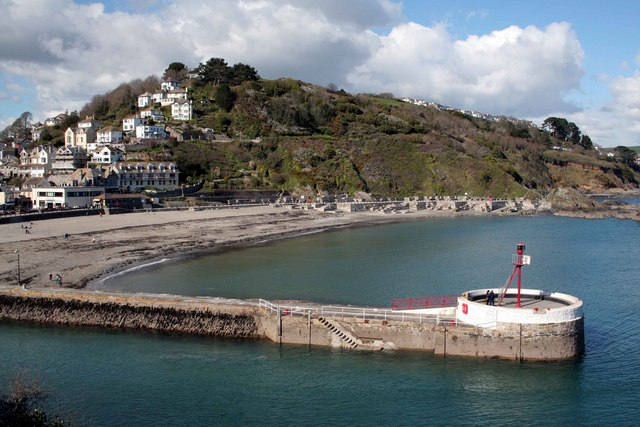
Banjo Pier, Looe

A Banjo Pier is a pier in the shape of a banjo.

The most notable example is probably the Banjo Pier in Looe, Cornwall, England (50.3510°N 4.4512°W), as it was the first and thus the prototype for many others around the world. It was designed by Joseph Thomas and built by Daniel Taylor.
