= Joseph Farrell =

Joseph Farrell may refer to:

- Joseph Farrell (politician) (1905–1999), Irish Fianna Fáil politician
- Joseph Farrell (1823—1904) Irish sculptor
- Joseph Farrell (priest) (1873–1960), Irish-American Catholic priest
- Joseph Lawrence Farrell (born 1963), superior general of the Augustinians

== See also ==
- Joe Farrell (disambiguation)
