= Joe Thomas =

Joe or Joseph Thomas may refer to:

== Entertainment ==
- Joe Thomas (alto saxophonist) (1908–1997), Oklahoma-born jazz saxophonist and songwriter
- Joe Thomas (flautist) (1933–2017), New Jersey-born jazz flautist and saxophonist
- Joe Thomas (tenor saxophonist) (1909–1986), Pennsylvania-born jazz saxophonist
- Joe Thomas (trumpeter) (1909–1984), Missouri-born swing jazz trumpeter
- Joe Thomas (clarinetist) (1902–1981), New Orleans jazz clarinetist
- Joe Thomas (actor) (born 1983), English actor
- Joe Thomas (producer) (1956–2024), American record and television producer
- Joe (singer) (Joseph Lewis Thomas, born 1973), American R&B singer and record producer

== Sports ==
=== American football ===
- Joe Thomas (American football executive) (1921–1983), head coach of the Baltimore Colts and NFL executive
- Joe Thomas (linebacker) (born 1991), American football player
- Joe Thomas (offensive tackle) (born 1984), former American football player
- Joe Thomas (wide receiver) (born 1963), former American football player
- Joey Thomas (born 1980), American football cornerback

=== Other sports ===
- Joe Thomas (racing driver) (1890–1965), American racecar driver
- Joe Thomas (basketball) (born 1948), American basketball player
- Joe Thomas (runner) (born 1988), Welsh middle distance runner
- Joe Thomas (rugby league) (born 1964), Australian former professional rugby league footballer
- Joe Thomas (rugby union) (born 1996), Welsh rugby union player
- Joe Thomas (footballer, born 1932), English footballer
- Joe Thomas (footballer, born 2002), Welsh footballer
- Joseph Thomas (boxer), South African Olympic boxer

== Others ==
- Joseph Thomas (surveyor) (1803–?), chief surveyor sent by the Canterbury Association to Canterbury, New Zealand
- Joseph M. Thomas (1829–1910), American politician in Wisconsin
- Joseph Thomas (architect) (1838–1901), Cornish civil engineer and entrepreneur, chiefly associated with Looe
- Joseph Miller Thomas (1898–1979), American mathematician
- Joe Thomas (communist) (1912–1990), British communist activist
- J. Antonio Thomas (Joseph Antonio Thomas, 1912–1998), Liberal party member of the House of Commons of Canada
- V. Joseph Thomas (1941–2018), Indian Police Service officer and Indian Army officer
- L. Joseph Thomas (born 1942), American educator and administrator
- Joe Thomas (Alaska politician) (born 1948), Alaska state senator
- Joseph C. Thomas (born 1949), member of the Mississippi Senate
- Joe Thomas (talk show host) (born 1963), American political radio talk show host/program director
- Joseph T. Thomas (born 1973), Australian citizen whose conviction for receiving funds from Al-Qaeda was overturned on appeal

== See also ==
- Thomas Joseph (1954–2021), Indian writer of Malayalam literature
