= Paškal Jukić =

- Born: 1748; Živogošće, Republic of Venice
- Died: 7 November 1806 (aged 57–58); Zadar, Napoleonic Kingdom of Italy
- Other names: Paško Jukić, Paschalis Juchich
- Occupations: Franciscian friar and writer

Paškal "Paško" Jukić (Serbo-Croatian pronunciation: [paʃkal jukitɕ]; Latin: Paschalis Juchich; 1748 – 7 November 1806) was a preacher, musician, and professor of philosophy in the Makarska lyceum in present-day Croatia. He is best known for editing the Italian-Croatian bilingual newspaper Il Regio Dalmata – Kraglski Dalmatin, considered to be the first periodical printed in Croatian, published between 1806 and 1810. Since Jukić belonged to a group of Franciscan friars who went on to become prominent figures in the cultural life of Bosnia and Herzegovina in the second half of the 19th century, some sources compare him to other influential writers of the time such as Vuk Karadžić and Ljudevit Gaj.

== Biography ==
Jukić was born in 1748 in Živogošće, a coastal village in Dalmatia, some 20 kilometres south of Makarska, which was at the time part of the Republic of Venice. After completing the Franciscan elementary and middle schools in his hometown, in 1767 he joined the Franciscan order, and later became professor of philosophy at the Makarska lyceum.

After Napoleon had conquered Austrian-held Dalmatia in 1806, and the establishment of the French Illyrian Provinces, Italian journalist Bartolomeo Benincasa moved to the Dalmatian city of Zadar to publish a bilingual Italian-Croatian newspaper titled Il Regio Dalmata – Kraglski Dalmatin, the first newspaper printed in Croatian. Benincasa asked friar Andrija Dorotić to recommend one of the Franciscans for the job of translating Italian articles into Croatian. Dorotić recommended Jukić, who then became a co-editor of the bilingual newspaper. Jukić also worked as a translator in the Zadar-based government office of the Napoleonic Kingdom of Italy.

Launching the newspaper on 12 July 1806 as a weekly news digest, Jukić contributed to the first dozen or so editions of Il Regio Dalmata – Kraglski Dalmatin before dying in Zadar less than four months later on 7 November 1806. The newspaper, sponsored by the local French government of the Illyrian Provinces, lived to see a total of 175 issues before publishing its last edition on 1 April 1810.

Due to his role in promoting printed Croatian, Jukić later became an important person in the political history of Croatia. In the early 20th century friar Juraj Božitković conducted extensive research of Jukić's literary manuscripts found in the archives in Makarska, and published the results of his findings in his work Friar Paskal Jukić and his unpublished poems about prince Ivan Mirković (Croatian: Fr. Paskal Jukić i njegove neobjavljene pjesme o knezu Ivanu Mirkoviću) in 1938.

== Bibliography ==
Jukić belonged to a group of Franciscan friars who wrote poetry greatly influenced by the works of Andrija Kačić Miošić. Jukić's octosyllabic verse has ratio of 66.5%:13.6%.

Jukić composed three complete and two incomplete poems about count Ivan Mirković. They are very similar to poems about Skanderbeg written by Kačić. Jukić also wrote the following (unpublished) works:

- Razmišljanja duhovna za sve dane godine
- Razlike svete pjesme which is collection of poems that also includes Božićne pjesme
- Institutiones philosophicae ad mentem Ioannis Duns=Scoti omnium theologorum principis concinatae Juventutique propositae A. P. F. P. - Makarska 1779–1780
