= Joseph Harris =

Joseph Harris may refer to:

- Joseph Harris (stage actor) (c.1650–1715), English actor and playwright
- Joseph John Harris (1699–1769), English organist and composer
- Joseph Harris (astronomer) (1702–1764), British blacksmith, astronomer, navigator, economist and natural philosopher
- Joseph Harris (organist) (1744–1814), English organist and composer
- Joseph Harris (Gomer) (1773–1825), Welsh Baptist minister, author, and journal editor
- Joseph Strelley Harris (1811–1889), pastoralist and magistrate in the south-west of Western Australia
- Joseph Harris (Wisconsin politician) (1813–1889), member of the Wisconsin State Senate
- Joseph Smith Harris (1836–1910), civil engineer and president of the Reading Railroad
- Joseph Harris (trade unionist) (born 1866), Irish trade unionist and political activist
- Joseph Henry Harris (1888–1952), Canadian businessman and politician
- Joseph Harris (rower) (1913–1974), Canadian Olympic rower
- Joseph Harris (cricketer) (born 1965), Indian-born Canadian cricketer
- Joseph Allen Harris (1888–1967), Canadian politician and research chemist, discoverer of promethium (element 61)
- Joseph C. Harris (born 1940), American medievalist and scholar

== See also ==
- Joe Harris (disambiguation)
