= Joseph C. Murphy =

American politician

Joseph C. Murphy (August 3, 1907 in Milwaukee, Wisconsin – 1987) was a member of the Michigan House of Representatives.

== Career ==
Murphy was a member of the House of Representatives from 1933 to 1940. He was a Democrat. Despite his age, he served in the Navy during World War II. Following the war, Mr. Murphy was chief assistant U.S. attorney for the southeastern district of Michigan and served as acting U.S. attorney. Mr. Murphy served ten years as a bankruptcy judge in Detroit and finished his legal career working for the Wayne County prosecutors office.
