= Joe O'Donnell =

Joe or Joseph O'Donnell may refer to:

- Joe O'Donnell (photojournalist) (1922–2007), American documentarian, photojournalist and photographer
- Joe O'Donnell (American football) (1941–2019), offensive lineman
- Joe O'Donnell (musician) (born 1948), Celtic rock violinist
- Joe O'Donnell (footballer) (born 1961), Scottish footballer
- Joseph O'Donnell Sr. (1722–1787), Spanish general and father of Joseph O'Donnell the younger and two other generals of the Napoleonic Wars
- Joseph O'Donnell (younger) (1768–1836), Spanish general of the Napoleonic Wars
- Joseph O'Donnell Jr. (1925–2005), Lieutenant Governor of the U.S. State of Rhode Island
- Joseph O'Donnell (screenwriter) (1891–1963), American screenwriter
