= Joe Amato =

Joe Amato may refer to:

- Joe Amato (poet) (born 1955), American writer
- Joe Amato (dragster driver) (born 1944), American dragster driver
- Joseph Amato (mobster) (died 1927), Chicago mobster
- Joseph A. Amato (1938–2025), author and scholar of history
