= Šop-Đokić =

Serbian family

Šop-Đokić (Serbian Cyrillic: Шоп-Ђокић) is a Serbian family from Leskovac. Their family house in the town, built in the first half of the 19th century, is a cultural monument and is protected by the state. The house is one several old buildings in the Balkan style. Kostadin Šop-Đokić was the president of the board for building and renovating churches in the municipality of Leskovac in 1931. The family has retrieved some of its formerly owned property taken away by the state, and is looking to retrieve the family house, which is today a symbol of Leskovac and the location of the city tourist organization.

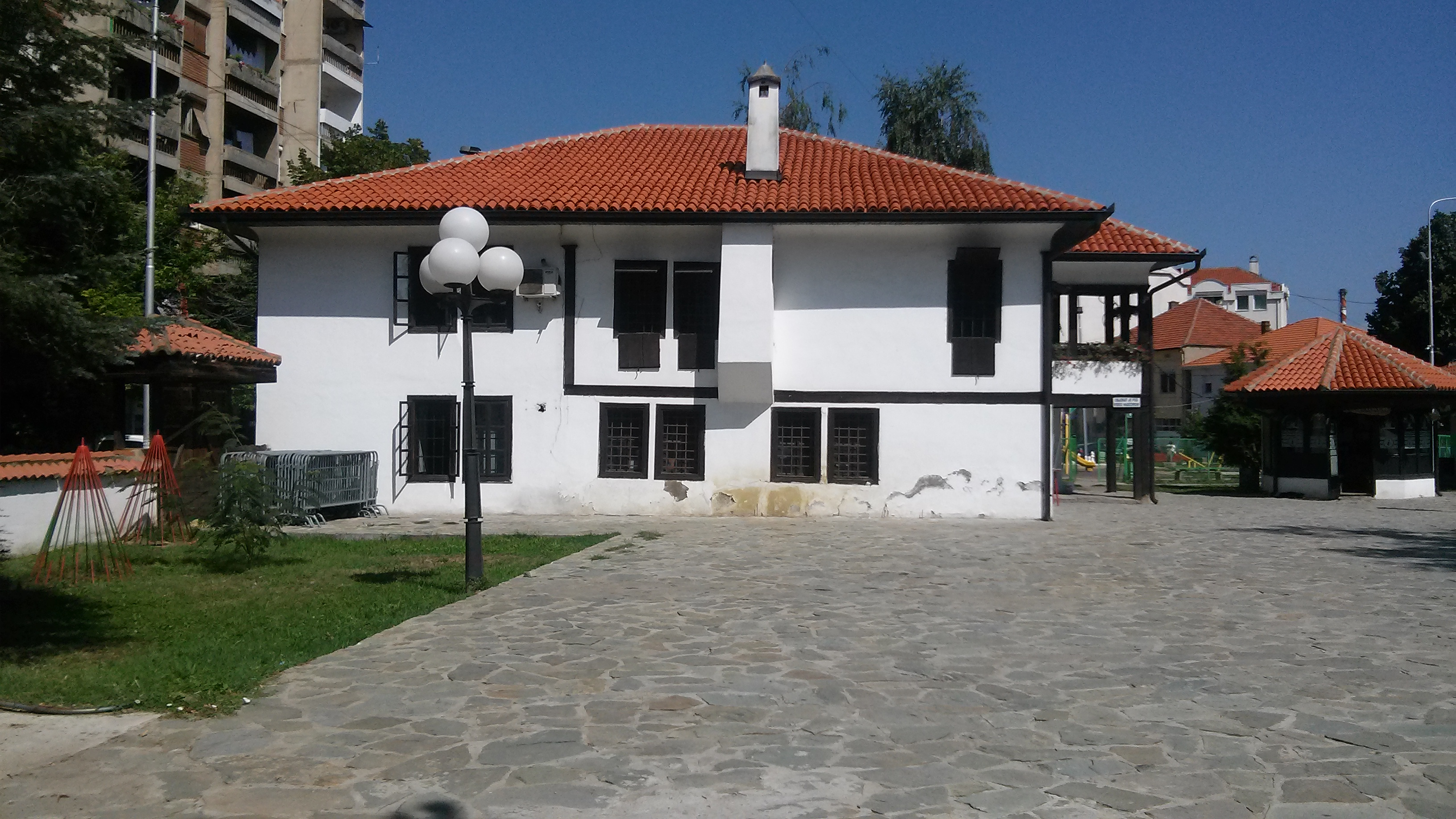
Family house

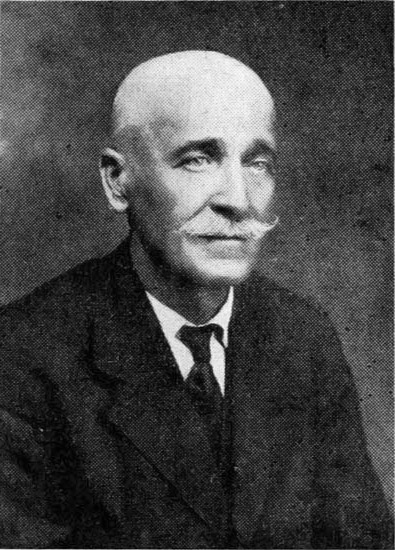
Kostadin Šop-Đokić

== Sources ==
- "Кућа Шоп Ђокића". Spomenici kulture.
