= Dragan Đukić =

Swiss footballer (born 1987)

Dragan Djukić
Personal information
- Date of birth: 15 July 1987 (age 39)
- Height: 1.83 m (6 ft 0 in)
- Position: Goalkeeper

Youth career
- 1997–1999: FC Blue Stars Zürich
- 1999–2005: Grasshopper

Senior career*
Years	Team	Apps	(Gls)
2005–2006	Grasshopper B	32	(0)
2006–2008	Grasshopper Club Zürich	8	(0)
2008	FC Wohlen	4	(0)
2009–2011	SC Kriens	40	(0)
2011–2012	FC Thun	2	(0)
2012–2014	SC YF Juventus	56	(1)
2014–2017	FC United Zürich	73	(0)
2017–2018	SC YF Juventus	27	(0)
2018–2020	FC Affoltern		

International career
2003–2005	Switzerland U-16	1	(0)
2005–2006	Switzerland U-18	5	(0)
2006–2008	Switzerland U-21	2	(0)
- * Club domestic league appearances and goals

Dragan Đukić or Djukić (born 15 July 1987) is a Swiss retired football player.

== Career ==
The Swiss player began his career at FC Blue Stars Zürich in 1997 and played there in the E- and D-youth. In 1999, he joined Grasshopper. In July 2006 he debut for the first team of Grasshopper; he played as substitute for Fabio Coltorti each one game at UI Cup and Swiss Super League.

After the transfer from Fabio Coltorti abode Djukic in the season 2007/08 surrogate and joined in July 2008 to FC Wohlen, in January 2009 left Wohlen and signed for SC Kriens.

== International ==
Đukić has represented Switzerland in the national youth teams U-16, U-18 and U-21.
