= Joe Clint Jenkins =

American politician

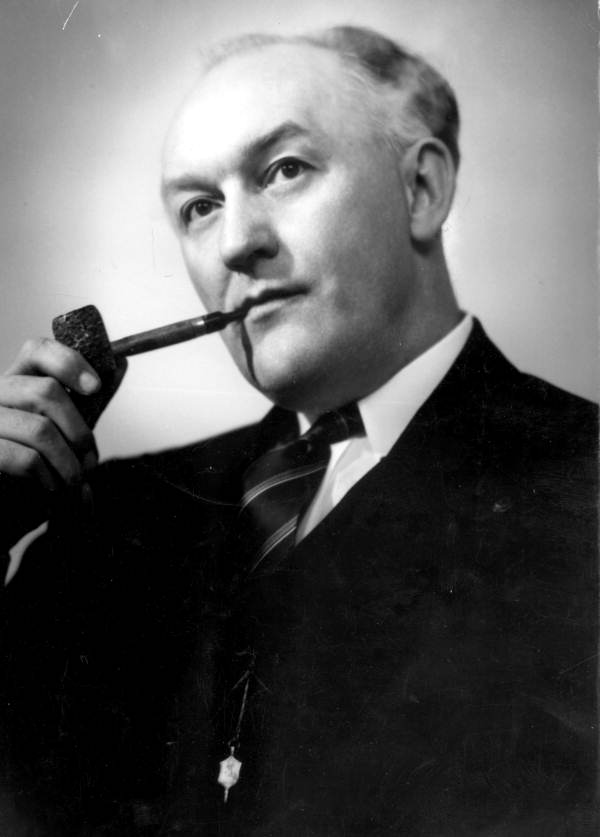
- Jenkins in 1939

Member of the Florida House of Representatives from Alachua County
- In office 1939–1948

Personal details
- Born: February 15, 1895 Kentucky, U.S.
- Died: April 26, 1959 (aged 64)
- Party: Democratic

Joe Clint Jenkins (February 15, 1895 – April 26, 1959) was an American politician. He served as a Democratic member of the Florida House of Representatives.

== Life and career ==
Jenkins was born in Kentucky. He was an attorney.

In 1939, Jenkins was elected to the Florida House of Representatives, serving until 1948.

Jenkins died on April 26, 1959, at the age of 64.
