= Jasmina Đokić =

Serbian painter

Jasmina Djokic Јасмина Ђокић
- Born: May 8, 1970 (age 55) (Socialist Federal Republic of Yugoslavia) Kruševac, SFR Yugoslavia
- Education: Faculty of Fine Arts, University of Belgrade
- Known for: Painting

Jasmina Đokić (Serbian Cyrillic: Јасмина Ђокић, anglicized as "Jasmina Djokic") is a Serbian painter. She lives and works in Kruševac. She graduated at the Faculty of Fine Arts, University of Belgrade, in the painting department in 1997 in the class of professor Momcilo Antonović. Master studies completed on the same faculty in the class of professor Zoran Vuković. She had 3 independent exhibitions (Belgrade, Kraljevo, Kruševac). She participated at several international group exhibitions in the country and abroad, as well as art colonies.

== Major group exhibitions ==
- 1996 - International Exhibition mail'art 'Crazy Cats and Fantastic', Pisa, Italy
- 1996 - The first international biennial exhibition of a small size 'Międzynarodowe Raciborz Biennale'96', Raciborz, Poland
- 1996 - Small form art gallery, Kruševac
- 1997 - 3rd International Electrografphic Art Exhibition'97 Pisa, Pisa, Italy
- 1997 - Mail Art Project: The Songs's Routes', Ravenna, Italy
- 1998 - The second international biennial exhibition of a small size 'II Miedzinarodowe Biennale Raciborz'98', Raciborz, Poland
- 1998 - Fifth International Biennial miniature art, Gornji Milanovac
- 2000 - 3rd International Biennial Exhibition of a small size 'Międzynarodowe Raciborz Raciborz Biennale, Poland
- 2000 - Second International Christian Art Show, Seaside Art Gallery, Nags Head, North Carolina, United States
- 2000 - Eighth International Miniature Art Show, Seaside Art Gallery, Nags Head, North Carolina, United States
- 2000 - Second Biennial art and applied art, Smederevo
- 2000 - Sixth International Biennial miniature art, Gornji Milanovac
- 2000 - Artists manastiru Žiči, City Pinakoteka, Thessaloniki, Greece
- 2003 - Seventh International Biennial miniature art, Gornji Milanovac
