= Joe Farrell (disambiguation) =

Joe Farrell was an American jazz multi-instrumentalist.

Joe Farrell may also refer to:

- Joe Farrell (baseball) (1857–1893), American baseball player
- Joe Farrell (soccer) (born 1994), American soccer player
- Joe Farrell (visual effects artist), Australian visual effects artist
- Joe Farrell, drummer on the album Folk-Lore
- Joe Farrell (politician), Irish politician

== See also ==
- Joseph Farrell (disambiguation)
- Jo Farrell, British police officer
