= Joe Becker =

Joe Becker may refer to:

- Joe Becker (baseball) (1908–1998), catcher in Major League Baseball
- Joe Becker (cyclist) (1931–2014), American Olympic cyclist
- Joe Becker (musician) (born 1976), American guitarist, composer and multi-instrumentalist
- Joe Becker (Unicode), co-founder of the Unicode Consortium
- Jozef Becker, drummer for Thin White Rope, True West, Game Theory, and The Loud Family
