= Hasim Đoković =

Montenegrin footballer

Personal information
- Full name: Hasim Đoković
- Date of birth: 20 May 1978 (age 48)
- Place of birth: Tuzi, SFR Yugoslavia
- Position: Attacking midfielder

Youth career
- Dečić

Senior career*
Years	Team	Apps	(Gls)
–1994	Dečić		
1994–1995	Mladost Podgorica		
1995–1997	Borac Čačak	8+	(0+)
1998–2000	Budućnost Podgorica	31	(0)
2000–2001	Vllaznia Shkodër	35	(2)
2001	Reggiana	4	(0)
2002–2003	Vllaznia Shkodër	17	(0)
2003–2004	Dečić		
2004–2005	Željezničar	3	(0)
2006–2010	Dečić	104	(3)
- * Club domestic league appearances and goals

Hasim Đoković (Cyrillic: Хасим Ђоковић; born 20 May 1978) is a Montenegrin retired footballer who played professionally in Montenegro, Serbia, Italy, Albania and Bosnia and Herzegovina.

== Club career ==
He represented many teams, including Italian Reggiana, Serbian FK Borac Čačak, Bosnian FK Željezničar Sarajevo, Montenegrin FK Budućnost Podgorica, but his best period was while playing in Albanian Superliga club KF Vllaznia Shkodër where he won the 2000/01 Championship and Supercup, and was proclaimed the best foreign player and the best midfielder of that season by the Albanian Football Federation.
