= Joseph D. Martin =

American historian of science and technology

Joseph D. Martin is an American historian of science and technology. He is professor of history at Durham University.

Martin received his PhD in 2013 from the University of Minnesota.

In 2022, Martin was elected a Fellow of the American Physical Society (APS) for 'important research on the history and evolution of condensed matter physics'.

== Bibliography ==
- Martin, Joseph D. (2018). Solid State Insurrection: How the Science of Substance Made American Physics Matter. University of Pittsburgh Press.
