= Ljubiša Đoković =

Serbian politician (born 1960)

Ljubiša Đoković (Serbian Cyrillic: Љубиша Ђоковић; born 27 February 1960) is a politician in Serbia. He was a member of the National Assembly of Serbia for most of the period from 2001 to 2007, serving with the Democratic Party of Serbia (Demokratska stranka Srbije, DSS). Đoković is now a member of Healthy Serbia (Zdrava Srbija, ZS) and a member of the Kraljevo city assembly.

== Private career ==
Đoković is a medical doctor and radiology specialist. He lives in Kraljevo.

== Politician ==
=== Parliamentarian ===
The DSS contested the 2000 Serbian parliamentary election as part the Democratic Opposition of Serbia (Demokratska opozicija Srbije, DOS), a broad and ideologically diverse coalition of parties that opposed the prior administration of Slobodan Milošević and his allies. The DOS won a landslide victory in the election, taking 176 out of 250 mandates. Đoković was included on the DOS's electoral list in the 138th position and was chosen for a mandate when the new assembly convened in January 2001. (From 2000 to 2011, mandates in Serbian parliamentary elections were awarded to successful parties or coalitions rather than to individual candidates, and it was common practice for the mandates to be assigned out of numerical order. Đoković did not automatically receive a mandate by virtue of his list position.)

In 2002, the DSS left the DOS and moved to the opposition. The parliamentary mandates of several DSS members, including Đoković, were nullified at the discretion of the DOS on 12 June 2002, although this decision was subsequently revoked and the mandates restored.

The DSS fielded its own list in the 2003 parliamentary election, and Đoković appeared in the 104th position. The list won fifty-three seats; Đoković was not initially selected for a mandate, but he was able to return to the assembly on 16 March 2004 as the replacement for another party member. The DSS was the dominant party in Serbia's coalition government during this period, and Đoković served with its parliamentary majority. In 2005, he took part in a friendly football match that pitted Serbian parliamentarians against those from the United Kingdom in the context of a diplomatic visit by the UK parliamentarians to Serbia. The Serbia side won 5–1, with Đoković scoring two goals.

For the 2007 and 2008 Serbian parliamentary elections, the DSS ran in an alliance with New Serbia. Đoković appeared on the party's list in both elections, but he was not selected for a mandate on either occasion.

Serbia's electoral system was reformed in 2011, such that parliamentary mandates were awarded to candidates on successful lists in numerical order. Đoković appeared in the seventy-eighth position on the DSS list in the 2012 parliamentary election and was not re-elected when the list won twenty-one mandates. He also appeared on the DSS's list in the 2014 election and on a combined DSS–Dveri list in the 2016 election, although he did not return to parliament on either occasion.

Đoković subsequently left the DSS and joined Healthy Serbia, appearing in the twenty-sixth position on its coalition list with Better Serbia (Bolja Srbija, BS) in the 2020 parliamentary election. The list did not cross the electoral threshold to win representation in the national assembly.

=== Municipal politics ===
Đoković has also been active in the municipal politics of Kraljevo for several years. He was among the candidates elected to the city assembly in the 2008 Serbian local elections. He received the second position on the DSS list in the 2012 local elections and was re-elected when the list won four mandates. He was not re-elected in 2016, when the DSS list fell below the electoral threshold.

For the 2020 Serbian local elections in Kraljevo, Healthy Serbia joined an electoral coalition with Better Serbia and the Movement for the Restoration of the Kingdom of Serbia (Pokret obnove Kraljevine Srbije, POKS). Đoković received the second position on their list and was returned to the local assembly when the list won four mandates.
