= Joe Bedford =

English rugby union player

- Born: 16 February 1984 (age 42) Leeds, Yorkshire
- Height: 178 cm (5 ft 10 in)
- Weight: 87 kg (13 st 10 lb)
- School: Woodhouse Grove and Farnley Park High School

Rugby union career
- Position: Scrum half
- Current team: West Leeds Rugby Club
Senior career
Years	Team	Apps	(Points)
2007–11	Leeds Carnegie	67	(55)
2011-12	NG Dragons	21	(5)
2012-	Doncaster	10	(10)

Joe Bedford (born 16 February 1984) is an English professional rugby union player. His primary position is scrum half. Bedford joined Newport Gwent Dragons for the 2011–12 season having previously played for Rotherham Titans and Leeds Carnegie. In January 2013 Bedford was released by Newport Gwent Dragons and joined Doncaster RFC
