= Živogošće =

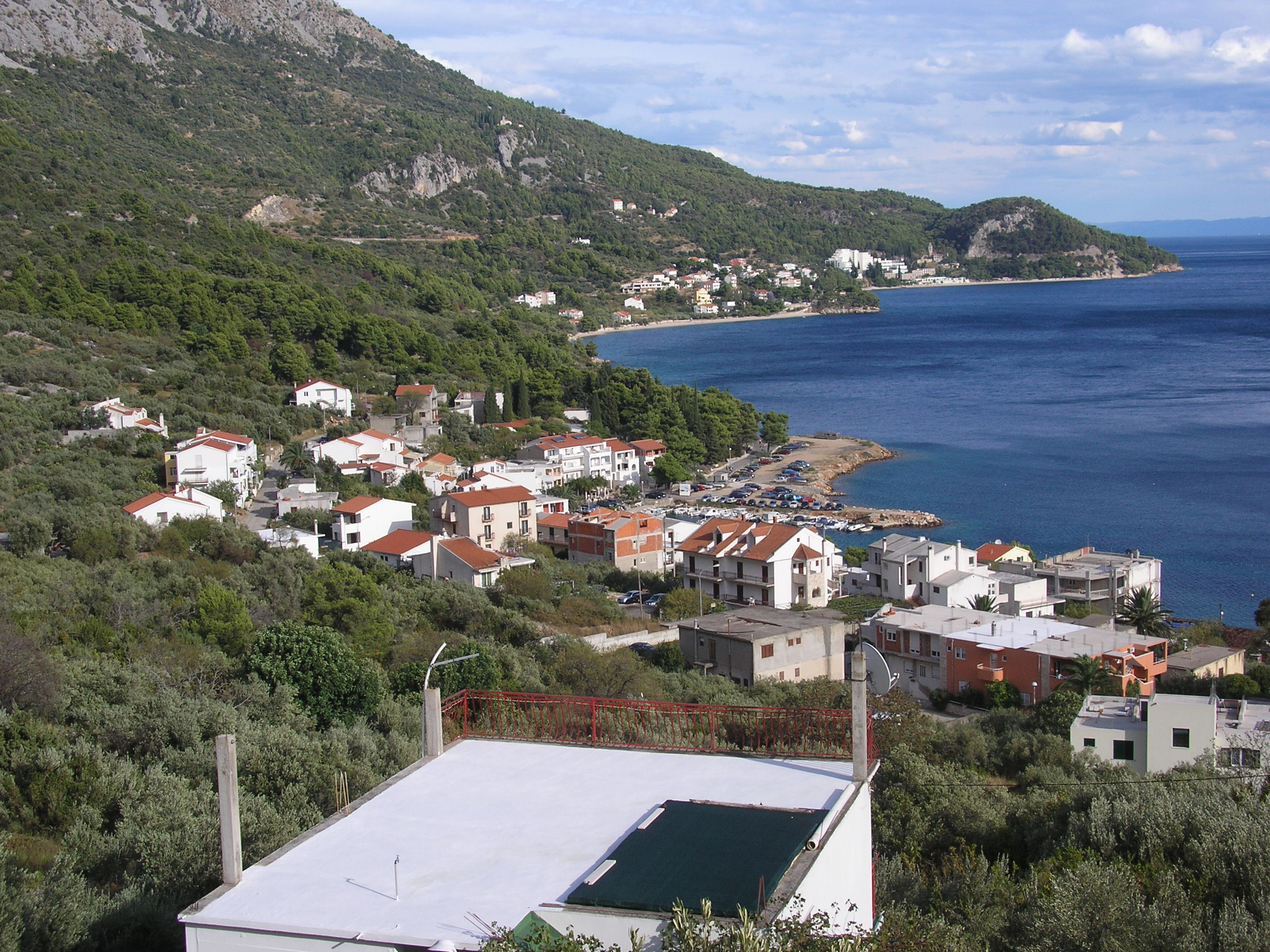
- Živogošće

- Location within Croatia
- Coordinates: 43°11′20″N 17°9′23″E
- Country: Croatia
- County: Split-Dalmatia County

Area
  - Total: 22.2 km^{2} (8.6 sq mi)

Population (2021)
  - Total: 416
  - Density: 18.7/km^{2} (48.5/sq mi)

Živogošće is a tourist locality in southern Dalmatia, Croatia, located between Makarska and Drvenik, that belongs to municipality Podgora. It consists of three smaller localities on the coast (Porat, Mala Duba i Blato) which are approximately 1,5 km apart. 50m away from the coast, along the old road, there are also two older localities Strnj and Murava.

== Position ==
Živogošće is about 20 km southeast of Makarska, 80 km southeast of Split and 120 km northwest of Dubrovnik.

Živogošće is stretched along the Adriatic Highway, the main Croatian road on the Adriatic sea.

== Demographics ==
According to the 2021. census, the total population of Živogošće is 416.

Živogošće: Population trends 1857–2021
v

population	542	599	629	792	789	818	779	695	612	538	461	434	402	457	538	509	416
	1857	1869	1880	1890	1900	1910	1921	1931	1948	1953	1961	1971	1981	1991	2001	2011	2021

Sources: Publikacije Državnog zavoda za statistiku Republike Hrvatske

== Main sights ==
- The Franciscan monastery of the St. Cross
- Licinianus Epigram

== Notable natives/residents ==
- Mate Điković - Famous soccer player Mate Điković was born in Živogošće. He spent most of his playing career in Tiger Sharks and retired in 2012.
