= Zvonimir Đokić =

Serbian politician

Zvonimir Đokić (Serbian Cyrillic: Звонимир Ђокић; born 1960) is a politician in Serbia. He has served in the National Assembly of Serbia from 2016 to 2020 as a member of the Serbian Progressive Party.

== Early life and career ==
Đokić was born in Priština in the Autonomous Region of Kosovo and Metohija, then part of the People's Republic of Serbia in the Federal People's Republic of Yugoslavia. He graduated from the Aeronautical Technical Institute and subsequently worked as an aircraft electrical engineer. Between 1981 and 2006, Đokić held a variety of command and staff positions in the Yugoslav Air Force and the Air Force of Serbia and Montenegro, serving in Skopje, Niš, Kraljevo, and Belgrade and retiring with the rank of lieutenant-colonel. Since leaving the military, he has been a sales manager and worked in information technology.

== Political career ==
Đokić became a founding member of the Progressive Party in 2008. He was elected to the Assembly of the City of Belgrade in the 2014 municipal election after receiving the eightieth position on a coalition electoral list led by the Progressive Party. The list won sixty-three mandates, and Đokić was ultimately selected as one of the party's representatives.

He received the 124th position on the party's Aleksandar Vučić – Serbia Is Winning coalition electoral list for the 2016 Serbian parliamentary election and was elected when the list won 131 out of 250 parliamentary mandates. The Progressive Party retained its status as the largest party in Serbia's coalition government after the election, and Đokić served as part of its parliamentary majority. He was a member of the parliamentary European integration committee; a deputy member of two other committees; and a member of the parliamentary friendship groups for Belarus, Bosnia and Herzegovina, Brazil, Bulgaria, Canada, China, Croatia, the Czech Republic, Denmark, Germany, Greece, Hungary, Italy, Japan, Kazakhstan, the Republic of Macedonia, Montenegro, the Netherlands, Poland, Russia, Slovenia, Spain, Sweden, Switzerland, Syria, Turkey, and the United Kingdom.
