= Igor Đokić =

Serbian footballer

Personal information
- Full name: Igor Đokić
- Date of birth: 7 March 1979 (age 47)
- Place of birth: Svilajnac, SFR Yugoslavia
- Height: 1.76 m (5 ft 9 in)
- Position: Midfielder

Senior career*
Years	Team	Apps	(Gls)
2001–2002	Smederevo	2	(0)
2001	→ Građanski Svilajnac (loan)	13	(0)
2002–2003	Lommel	6	(0)
2003–2004	Radnički Niš	21	(0)
2004–2006	Smederevo	6	(0)
2006	→ Borac Žabari (loan)		
2009–2010	Dinamo Vranje		
2011–2020	Radnički Svilajnac	43	(0)
- * Club domestic league appearances and goals as of 30 October 2014

Igor Đokić (Serbian Cyrillic: Игор Ђокић; also transliterated Igor Djokić; born 7 March 1979) is a Serbian football midfielder who plays for Radnički Svilajnac in Serbian League East.
