= Oliver Đokić =

Serbian footballer

Personal information
- Full name: Oliver Đokić
- Date of birth: 12 August 1981 (age 45)
- Place of birth: Svilajnac, SFR Yugoslavia
- Height: 1.81 m (5 ft 11 in)
- Position: Midfielder

Senior career*
Years	Team	Apps	(Gls)
2001–2005	Smederevo	26	(0)
2002	→ Građanski Svilajnac (loan)	15	(3)
2004	→ Železničar Smederevo (loan)	4	(0)
2005–2006	Borac Žabari		
2006–2014	Radnički Svilajnac	38	(1)
- * Club domestic league appearances and goals as of 30 October 2014

Oliver Đokić (Serbian Cyrillic: Оливер Ђокић; also transliterated Oliver Djokić; born 12 August 1981) is a Serbian retired football midfielder who last played for Radnički Svilajnac in Serbian League East.
