= Hsio-yen Shih =

Canadian art historian

- Born: 1933; Hubei, Republic of China
- Died: May 2001 (aged 67); Toronto, Ontario, Canada

Academic background
- Education: Wellesley College; University of Chicago; Bryn Mawr College (Ph.D. 1961)
- Doctoral advisor: Alexander Soper

Academic work
- Discipline: Chinese art, Japanese art, art history, archaeology
- Institutions: Royal Ontario Museum; University of Toronto; National Gallery of Canada; University of Hong Kong

Chinese name
- Traditional Chinese: 時學顏
- Simplified Chinese: 时学颜
Transcriptions
Standard Mandarin
- Hanyu Pinyin: Shí Xuéyán
- Wade–Giles: Shih^{2} Hsüeh^{2}-yen^{2}

Hsio-yen Shih (1933–2001) was a Chinese-born Canadian art historian who specialized in early Chinese and Japanese paintings, as well as ancient Chinese pottery and bronzeware. She was director of the National Gallery of Canada from 1977 to 1981.

== Early life ==
Hsio-yen Shih was born in Hubei, Republic of China. When she was 6, her father Chao-yin Shih (Chinese: 時昭瀛; pinyin: Shí Zhāoyíng) served as a diplomat for the Nationalist government in Canada, and Hsio-yen lived in Ottawa for a time before returning to China. She attended high school in Shanghai before the Chinese Communist Revolution. After the Chinese Civil War she attended Wellesley College in Massachusetts, graduating in Art History in 1955. After gaining a M.A. in 1958 from the University of Chicago in Chicago, Illinois, she went on to study under Alexander Soper at Bryn Mawr College in Pennsylvania. Her 1961 Ph.D. thesis is titled Early Chinese Pictorial Style: From the Later Han to the Six Dynasties.

== Career ==
From 1961 to 1976, Hsio-yen Shih worked in Toronto, Canada, holding joint appointments at the Far Eastern Department of the Royal Ontario Museum (ROM) and the Department of East Asian Studies of the University of Toronto. She became Curator of the Far Eastern Department of ROM in 1968. In 1971 she became a full professor. From 1973 to 1974 she was Visiting Professor to the Institute of Chinese Studies at the Chinese University of Hong Kong in Hong Kong. In 1977 she moved to Ottawa to become Director of the National Gallery of Canada. She resigned in 1981 in response to budget cuts, and thereafter moved to Hong Kong, where she served as the Head of Department of Fine Arts at the University of Hong Kong until 1988. She retired in 1993, and spent her last years in Toronto.
