= Joe Harris =

Joe Harris may refer to:

== Sportspeople ==
- Joe Harris (pitcher) (1882–1966), pitcher in Major League Baseball
- Joe Harris (first baseman) (1891–1959), American first baseman in Major League Baseball
- Joe Harris (footballer) (1896–1933), Scottish footballer for Partick Thistle, Middlesbrough, Newcastle United, and York City
- Joe Harris (footballer, born 1929), (born 1929), Northern Irish footballer, see List of Oldham Athletic A.F.C. players (25–99 appearances)
- Gypsy Joe Harris (1945–1990), American boxer
- Joe Harris (American football) (born 1952), former American football linebacker in the National Football League
- Joe Harris (basketball) (born 1991), American basketball player

== Others ==
- Joe Harris (actor) (1870–1953), silent film actor
- Joe Harris (musician) (1926–2016), jazz drummer
- Joe Harris (illustrator) (1928–2017), American illustrator and storyboard artist, created Underdog, the Trix Rabbit and other characters
- Joe Frank Harris (born 1936), American politician
- Joe Harris (mathematician) (born 1951), mathematician
- Joe Harris (writer) (born 1973), filmmaker and comic book creator
- Joel Chandler Harris, author of the Uncle Remus stories, who worked as a journalist and editor under that name

== See also ==
- Joe Giles-Harris (born 1997), American football player
- Joseph Harris (disambiguation)
