= Branislav Đukanović =

Montenegrin footballer and manager

Personal information
- Full name: Branislav Đukanović
- Date of birth: 12 January 1959 (age 67)
- Place of birth: Titograd, Yugoslavia
- Position: Goalkeeper

Team information
- Current team: Montenegro U21 (goalkeeping coach)

Senior career*
Years	Team	Apps	(Gls)
1979–1980	OFK Titograd	8	(0)
1980–1986	Budućnost Titograd	62	(0)
1987–1988	Partizan	32	(0)
1988–1989	Sutjeska Nikšić	13	(0)
1989–1990	Budućnost Titograd	2	(0)

Managerial career
- 1992: Budućnost Titograd (assistant)
- 2007: Montenegro U-21 (GK coach)
- 2008: Amkar Perm (GK coach)
- 2009: FC Moscow (GK coach)
- 2010–2011: Dynamo Moscow (GK coach)
- 2011–2012: Amkar Perm (GK coach)
- 2012–: Rostov (GK coach)
- * Club domestic league appearances and goals

Branislav Đukanović (Cyrillic: Бранислав Ђукановић; born 12 January 1959) is a Montenegrin football manager and former goalkeeper.

As a goalkeeper, after playing his first professional season with a Second League OFK Titograd, he has played mostly in the Yugoslav First League with FK Budućnost Podgorica, FK Partizan and FK Sutjeska Nikšić.

After retiring, he has become a goalkeeping coach. He has been coaching the goalkeepers of the Montenegro under-21 team since 2007.
