= Budimir Đukić =

Serbian footballer

Personal information
- Full name: Budimir Đukić
- Date of birth: 26 July 1977 (age 49)
- Place of birth: Kragujevac, SFR Yugoslavia
- Height: 1.79 m (5 ft 10 in)
- Position: Midfielder

Senior career*
Years	Team	Apps	(Gls)
1995–1999	Radnički Kragujevac		
1999–2000	Čukarički		
2000–2004	Slavia Sofia	99	(4)
2005–2006	Radnički Kragujevac	30	(6)
2006–2007	HJK	4	(0)
2007–2008	Spartak Varna	33	(0)
2008–2009	Metalac Gornji Milanovac	28	(1)
2009–2010	Šumadija Radnički 1923	14	(0)
- * Club domestic league appearances and goals

Budimir Đukić (Serbian Cyrillic: Будимир Ђокић; also transliterated Djukić; born 26 July 1977) is a former Serbian footballer who played as a midfielder. His first club was FK Radnički Kragujevac, that in the beginning of the 2009–10 season, together with FK Šumadija 1903, formed a new club, FK Šumadija Radnički 1923.
