= Joe Martin (writer) =

American writer (including playwright) and academic (born 1953)

Joe Martin (pen name Yousef Daoud; born 1953 Norwalk, Connecticut) is an American writer (including playwright), academic and theatre director.

Martin has written two volumes of fiction, theatrical works, and essays on theater, arts in the Middle East, and religion. He is a senior lecturer in theatre arts and studies (and the writing seminars) at Johns Hopkins University.

== Education ==
Martin received his undergraduate education at George Washington University where he studied American literature and creative writing. At the University of Bergen in Norway, he took examinations in comparative literature in 1979. Martin earned a Master of Fine Arts degree in creative writing with a concentration in play writing at the University of British Columbia (UBC) in Vancouver, where he also studied directing in the Department of Theatre.

In 1987, Martin earned a Doctor of Philosophy degree in comparative literature from UBC, with a concentration in drama.

After receiving several university graduate fellowships, The American-Scandinavian Foundation provided a fellowship for a year, divided between Norway (Universitetet i Oslo) and Sweden (Stockholmsuniversitet and Dramatiska Institutet). Martin assembled his work into a dissertation and later a book on the Norwegian writer Jens Bjørneboe. Then, he also published a book of translations of works by August Strindberg.

== Career ==
=== Artistic career ===
In Vancouver, he worked for five years developing Open Theatre Projects, and co-directing classic plays, with Shakespearean actor Dermott Hennelly (Noel Burton) before leaving for Scandinavia.

Martin's play The Dust Conspiracy won the Source Literary Prize in 1985. He later produced Deceit: Or Crime with Class, and Forfeit: A Play in Twelve Rounds at the Source Theater Festival. These plays and production credits are published in the collection Conspiracies: Six Plays.

In 1987, Martin produced the Strindberg Festival in Washington, D.C. He directed The Ghost Sonata at Metro Stage (then American Showcase Theatre), and produced three Strindberg one-acts at Source Theatre and Carl XII in a staged reading at the Shakespeare Theatre Company. He would later serve as dramaturg and consultant for Michael Kahn's production of Peer Gynt in 1998.

Martin's professional directing and producing credits for Open Theatre/CITE and Open Theatre/TUTA over fifteen years included some of his own plays and adaptations: an epic play about the guillotine, Anatole's Lover, The Receiver, Parabola: Tales of the Wise and the Idiots (a dance theatre work choreographed by Anne Bassen), The Match Girl's SNOW QUEEN – created with D.C. composer Anna Larson--Woyzeck, with a score for live brass by Larrance Fingerhut, Three Plays by Brecht (or "The Wedding/The ChalkCross/The Beggar"), a touring production of Quartet by Heiner Mueller—both directed by Serbian expatriate director Zejlko Djukiic, and later Strindberg's A Dream Play and Rumi's Mathnavi.

In the 1990s, he translated and created works from Mexico. With Iona Weissberg, he translated Mexican playwright Juan Tovar's montage of works by Mexican author Juan Rulfo, The Crossroads (Los Encuentros), in 1994 (produced by Ensemble International in New York.) This led to a collaboration between Tovar and Martin on a work in both English and Spanish, El Trato, concerning an ill-fated attempt at a trade treaty between the U.S. and Mexico in the mid-19th century eventually presented in Spanish by La Compañía Nacional de Teatro in Mexico City and at Gala Teatro Hispano in a staged reading in Washington, D.C. An English readers-theatre version was produced by CITE and the Mexican Cultural Institute that toured the Washington area.

An epic play about a heroine of the French Resistance who was the daughter of a renowned Indian musician who first brought Sufism to the West, SOUNDWAVES: The Passion of Noor Inayat Khan, was presented first at The Brecht Forum, later by Bridge Theatre Group at the New York International Fringe Festival in 2013 and again by EnActe Arts Theatre. Other productions include his 2016 staging of Dario Fo's They Don't Pay? We Won't Pay? – revised before the Nobel Prize–winner's death, at Flashpoint Theatre in Washington, D.C.

=== Teaching career ===
Martin taught from 1990 to 2001 in the Department of Performing Arts at the American University. In 2000, as a Fulbright scholar in Romania, he taught American drama at the University of Bucharest, and directed the graduating class at the University of Theatre and Film Arts in Jose Rivera's Marisol.

Later, he worked in Europe and the Middle East as a Fulbright Specialist in Theatre, directing and creating college arts curricula in Jerusalem and the West Bank in 2011, and in Bethlehem at Dar al Kalima University in 2014. The two theatre projects culminated in essays collected in Staging Athol Fugard in Palestine – And Other Essays.

From 2002 to 2006, Martin taught theory and criticism and devised theatre at Catholic University of America. Since 2008, he has taught playwriting and dramatic literature as a senior lecturer for the Theatre Arts and Studies program at Johns Hopkins University.

== Works ==
- Keeper of the Protocols: The Works of Jens Bjørneboe in the Crosscurrents of Western Literature. (New York & Bern: Peter Lang; 1996).
- Conspiracies: Six Plays. (Louisville: Aran Press & Press Open, 1997).
- Foreigners: A Novel. (Davis, CA: Hi Jinx Press, 1997).
- Strindberg – Other Sides: Seven Plays. (New York & Bern: Peter Lang Publishers, 1997).
- Semmelweis by Jens Bjørneboe. Translation with introduction. (Los Angeles: Sun & Moon Classics, 1998).
- Parabola: Shorter Fictions. (Paradise, CA: Asylum Arts, 2000).
- Rumi's MATHNAVI: A Theatre Adaptation. (Raleigh, NC: Asylum Arts, 2007).
- The Rose and the Lotus: Sufism and Buddhism as Yousef Daoud. Essays published in Sufi Journal 1995–2006. (Indianapolis: Xlibris Spirituality, 2009).
- Spirit Garden: Poems with art by Enrique Castenon. (Washington, D.C.: PressOpen, 2012).
- Soundwaves: The Passion of Noor Inayat Khan. (PressOpen: Washington, D.C. 2016).
- Staging Athol Fugard in Palestine: And other essays on theatre and writers in the Holy Land. (Washington, D.C.: PressOpen, 2018.)

== Personal life ==
In 1990, Martin met the actress Lisa Lias in a production of his play Anatole's Lover. They later married, and worked on productions of international works for Open Theatre DC in collaboration with C.I.T.E., and later with TUTA Theatre and its director Zeljko Djukic (now relocated to Chicago.) They have one son, Beckett Lias Martin.

In 1997, he and Lias spent two months in India investigating different performance forms, religious art, the revival of the Sanskrit drama at Benares Hindu University, and studied Buddhist philosophy at the Institute of Buddhist Dialectics in Dharamsala.

The couple divorced in 2004; Martin continues to live in Washington, D.C.
