= Joseph Roberts (motivational speaker) =

Canadian motivational speaker (born 1966)

Joseph (Joe) Roberts (born November 25, 1966) also known as the "Skidrow CEO" is a Canadian motivational speaker, author, youth homelessness advocate and co-founder of The Push for Change Foundation. Roberts experienced drug addiction and chronic homelessness as a youth and entered drug treatment in 1991. Roberts worked in sales and web development before he became an inspirational keynote speaker. Roberts is the author of four books.

== Early life ==
Joe Roberts was born November 25, 1966, and was raised in Midland, Ontario. Roberts’ father died in 1975 when Roberts was 8. Roberts struggled with low self-esteem. At the age of nine, he started using drugs and quickly moved on to alcohol, marijuana, LSD, cocaine, and eventually heroin. He left home at 15 due to family conflict and the inability to get along with his stepfather. After being imprisoned at 16, he dropped out of Barrie North Collegiate at 18 and began regular intravenous drug use. At 19, Roberts relocated to British Columbia and found himself homeless on the streets of Vancouver's Downtown East-side, pushing a shopping cart and collecting recyclables to support his drug dependency. Shortly before Christmas in 1989, Roberts contacted his mother (who was located in Midhurst, Ontario) and she helped him relocate back to Ontario. After a suicide attempt, prevented and intervened by Ontario Provincial Police (OPP) Constable Scott MacLeod. Joe entered the Alcohol and Drug Intensive Treatment Program in Belleville, Ontario in 1991.

Roberts then applied and was accepted into the Business and Marketing Program at Loyalist College. He graduated in 1995, and then returned the following year for the Business Sales program. He graduated on the Dean’s list and won the Laurie H. Cameron Memorial Award for academic excellence with a combined GPA of 3.94. Due to success in business, Roberts received the Ontario Premier’s Award for College Graduates (Business) and as a result an annual bursary was created in Roberts’ name at Loyalist College: The Joe Roberts – Courage to Change Bursary. This bursary is awarded to a mature student who has overcome life obstacles and returned to school.

== Career ==
After graduating college, Joe Roberts moved back to Vancouver in 1996 and began a career in B2B sales for Minolta Canada selling business equipment. Joe quickly advanced and was able to leverage experience that he acquired while homeless "I transferred a lot of the skills I learned from hustling on the street and applied them to business," Roberts said in an interview with the Vancouver Province newspaper. One year later Joe took a management position with Aurora Visual Systems (audio-visual company) at their Vancouver office. His role expanded to manage the office and employees, and sales for the company increased.

Another year passed and Joe with partner Dr. Pesi A. Unwalla formed Mindware Design Communications in 1997. Mindware Design Communications was an early adopting content developer shortly after the internet gained traction and popularity. Mindware grew to become a leading Vancouver design company. Joe Roberts led Mindware Design Communications through a rapid business growth period over the following four years. The company employed 15 people with Roberts as President and CEO.

== Speaking ==
Joe Roberts departed the business sector and focused on inspirational keynote speaking in 2003. Joe presents lectures on resiliency and managing change and often speaks on issues related to mental health, addiction and homelessness. He has positioned his brand as the Skid Row CEO to reflect his lived experience with homelessness. He is the author of four books including 7 Secrets to Profit from Adversity (2003) and The Push for Change - Stepping into Possibility (2020).

== The Push for Change Trek ==
On May 1, 2016, the Push for Change Trek began in St. John’s, Newfoundland and ended on September 29, 2017, in Vancouver, British Columbia. Roberts pushed a modified shopping cart, a symbol of chronic homelessness, 9064 km (approximately 24 kilometers a day) for 517 days. The trek aimed to raise money and awareness about youth homelessness in Canada. The Push for Change, managed by Roberts’ wife Marie Marcoux-Roberts organized/attended 450 school and community events. At these events, students, families, police officers, government officials, and youth focused agencies raised money, heard Roberts speak and felt inspired to make change in their communities. These engagements allowed The Push for Change to raise the issue of youth homelessness and inspire communities to begin implementing strategies to prevent, reduce and end youth homelessness. Ontario Provincial Police joined the Push for Change.

By the end of the cross Canada trek, The Push for Change raised over $575,000 which was directed to both community initiatives to end youth homelessness, and to the Upstream Project. The Upstream Project is a "school based youth homeless prevention model developed by The Canadian Observatory on Homelessness and A Way Home and administered by Raising the Roof."

== Awards ==
Honorary Doctorate from Laurentian University
Meritorious Service Medal Canada (MSM)
Senate of Canada Sesquicentennial Medal
British Columbia Medal of Good Citizenship
Shaw Outstanding Canadian Award
John Graves Simcoe Medal of Excellence Award
Caring Canadian from the Lieutenant Governor of Ontario
Maclean’s Magazine – Canadian Honour Roll
British Columbia Courage To Come Back Award
Ontario Premier’s Award - Business (1994)
Business in Vancouver’s 40 under 40 Award
Zoomer Magazine 45 over 45 Award
Ernst & Young Entrepreneur of the Year Award
