= Veselin Đoković =

Serbian footballer (born 1976)

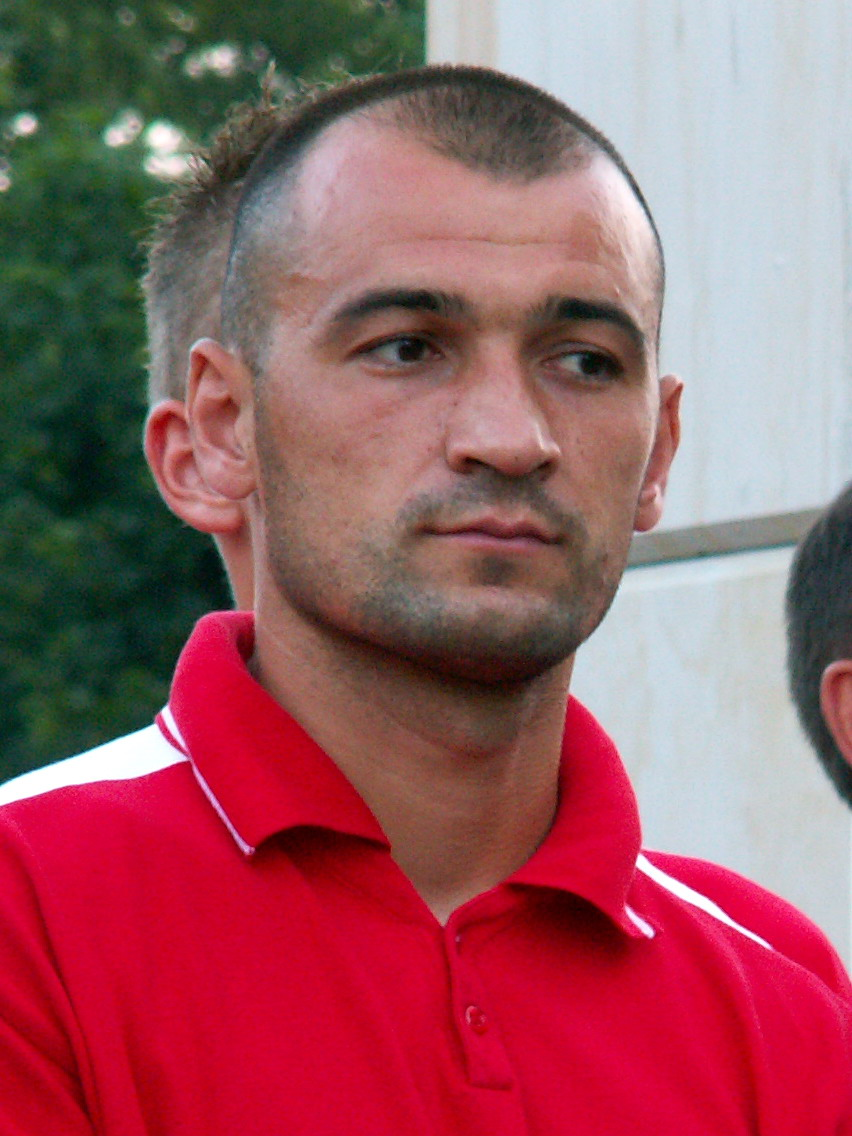

Personal information
- Full name: Veselin Đoković
- Date of birth: 18 February 1976 (age 50)
- Place of birth: Požega, SFR Yugoslavia
- Height: 1.85 m (6 ft 1 in)
- Position: Centre-back

Youth career
- Sloga Požega

Senior career*
Years	Team	Apps	(Gls)
1995–1998	Bečej	5+	(0+)
1998–1999	AS Marsa		
1999–2000	Mladost Lučani		
2000–2002	Pogoń Szczecin	17	(1)
2002–2004	Amica Wronki	42	(1)
2004–2006	Legia Warsaw	15	(1)
2006–2007	Korona Kielce	14	(1)

Managerial career
- Sloga Požega
- * Club domestic league appearances and goals

Veselin Đoković (Serbian Cyrillic: Веселин Ђоковић; also transliterated Veselin Djoković; born 18 February 1976) is a former professional footballer who played as a centre-back. Despite having been born in Serbia, he is often regarded as Montenegrin because of his family roots.

== Playing career ==
He started his football career in local side Sloga Požega before moving to FK Bečej who was playing back then in the First League of FR Yugoslavia.

In 1998, Đoković moved to Tunisian club AS Marsa, but in 1999 he returned to Serbia signing with FK Mladost Lučani playing in the Second League of FR Yugoslavia.

His first Polish club was Pogoń Szczecin, where he played in 2000, playing 17 matches and scoring one goal. In early 2002, he joined Amica Wronki, where he played in 44 matches and scored one goal.

From the start of the 2004–05 season, he played for Legia Warsaw, where he played in 13 matches and scored one goal that season.

== Managerial career ==
He was a manager of Sloga Požega. After termination he became a manager of one local soccer club near village Rasna.

== Honours ==
Legia Warsaw

- Ekstraklasa: 2005–06
