= Jokanovića kuća =

Coordinates: 43.856416°N 19.844446°E

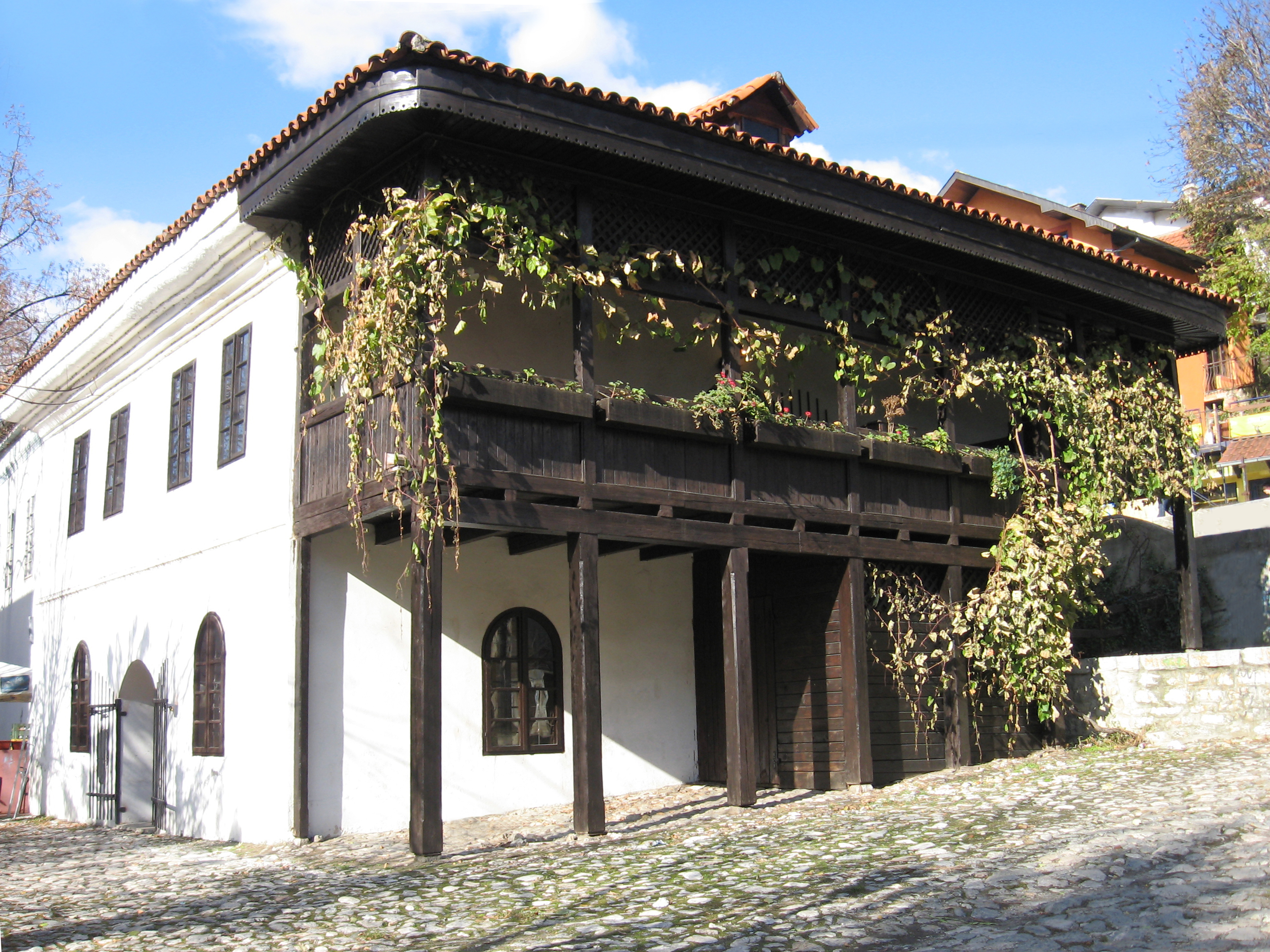
Jokanovica kuca

Jokanovića kuća (The house of Jokanović's), is one of the oldest buildings in Užice, a city in western Serbia. It is located in the center of the town, next to a local art gallery.

Jokanovića kuća was the property of the Jokanović family, one of the richest merchant families of Užice in the second half of 19th century. It is also known as "peccara" (the Jokanović's traded various commodities, including wine and brandy, and owned a couple of inns in Užice).

The dwelling is a rare representative house of 19th century Serbia. Due to ethnographic considerations, the building has been declared a national cultural heritage site.
