= Srđan Đukanović =

Montenegrin footballer

Personal information
- Full name: Srđan Đukanović
- Date of birth: 4 November 1980 (age 46)
- Place of birth: Titov Vrbas, SFR Yugoslavia
- Height: 1.85 m (6 ft 1 in)
- Position: Midfielder

Senior career*
Years	Team	Apps	(Gls)
2000–2003	Vrbas	91	(15)
2004–2008	Hajduk Kula	60	(3)
2007–2008	→ Mladost Apatin (loan)	26	(1)
2008	Odra Opole	0	(0)
2009	Hajduk Kula	3	(0)
2010	Cement Beočin		
2010	Big Bull Radnički	17	(1)
2011	Donji Srem	12	(0)
2011–2012	Bačka Topola	27	(1)
2013	Vrbas	12	(2)
Total		248	(23)
- * Club domestic league appearances and goals

Srđan Đukanović (Serbian Cyrillic: Срђан Ђукановић; born 4 November 1980) is a Montenegrin former professional footballer who played as a midfielder. He is best remembered for his time with Vrbas and Hajduk Kula.
