= Joseph Thomas (architect) =

Cornish architect

- Born: 10 March 1838; Roche, Cornwall, England
- Died: 14 August 1901 (aged 63); Looe, Cornwall, England
- Occupation: Architect
- Projects: Banjo Pier, Looe

Joseph Thomas (1838-1901) was a Cornish architect, civil engineer and entrepreneur who lived the majority of his life in Looe. He made a number of significant contributions to the development of the town in the late 19th century, including the design of the Banjo Pier and the creation of the Hannafore estate.

== Life and work ==
Thomas was born in Roche, near St Austell, on 10 March 1838. As a boy, he helped his father work on the construction of the bridge over the Looe River and the new roads to Polperro and St Martins. Later, he worked on a number of civil engineering projects in England and abroad, including the construction of naval forts in Plymouth, the Royal Albert Dock in London, the Arizona Canal, and the New York City docks.

He became an associate member of the Institution of Civil Engineers in 1886 and a full member in 1889.

In 1893, Thomas purchased land at Hannafore for development. The scheme included widening of West Looe quay, building a ramp up to the West Looe side of the bridge, and construction of the present-day high-level access road to Hannafore along the western side of the Looe Estuary.

In 1896, Thomas looked at the problem of silting up of the entrance to the harbour at Looe. His solution was to shorten the existing pier at the mouth of the river and instead build a larger round structure at the end, giving it the overall shape of a banjo. There was considerable scepticism about the scheme, so Thomas offered to pay for the work himself if it did not solve the problem. However, it proved successful, so the Looe Harbour Commissioners paid up. The Banjo Pier, as it thus became known, was the prototype for other similar structures built elsewhere.

Thomas also engineered the railway link between Coombe Junction and Liskeard station, linking the Looe Valley Line (formerly the Liskeard and Looe Railway) to the Cornish Main Line.

Thomas lived at The Old Vicarage in East Looe.

== Death and legacy ==
Thomas died at East Looe on 14 August 1901. His legacy to the town of Looe is considerable. He has been described "the man who helped prepare a town for the 20th Century". Another accolade is the following:

The contribution of Joseph Thomas to the current character and appearance of Looe cannot be overemphasised. Not only was he responsible for creating the Hannafore estate, but also the scenic Hannafore Road, the present line and extent of the quayside in West Looe (as far south as St Nicholas' church), the present form of the Banjo Pier and other prominent aspects of the character of the town are directly attributable to him.
