= Dokić =

Dokić (Serbian Cyrillic: Докић) is a Serbian surname. Notable people with the surname include:

- Jelena Dokić (born 1983), Australian tennis player
- Damir Dokić, father of Jelena Dokić
