= Jô Bilac =

Brazilian playwright

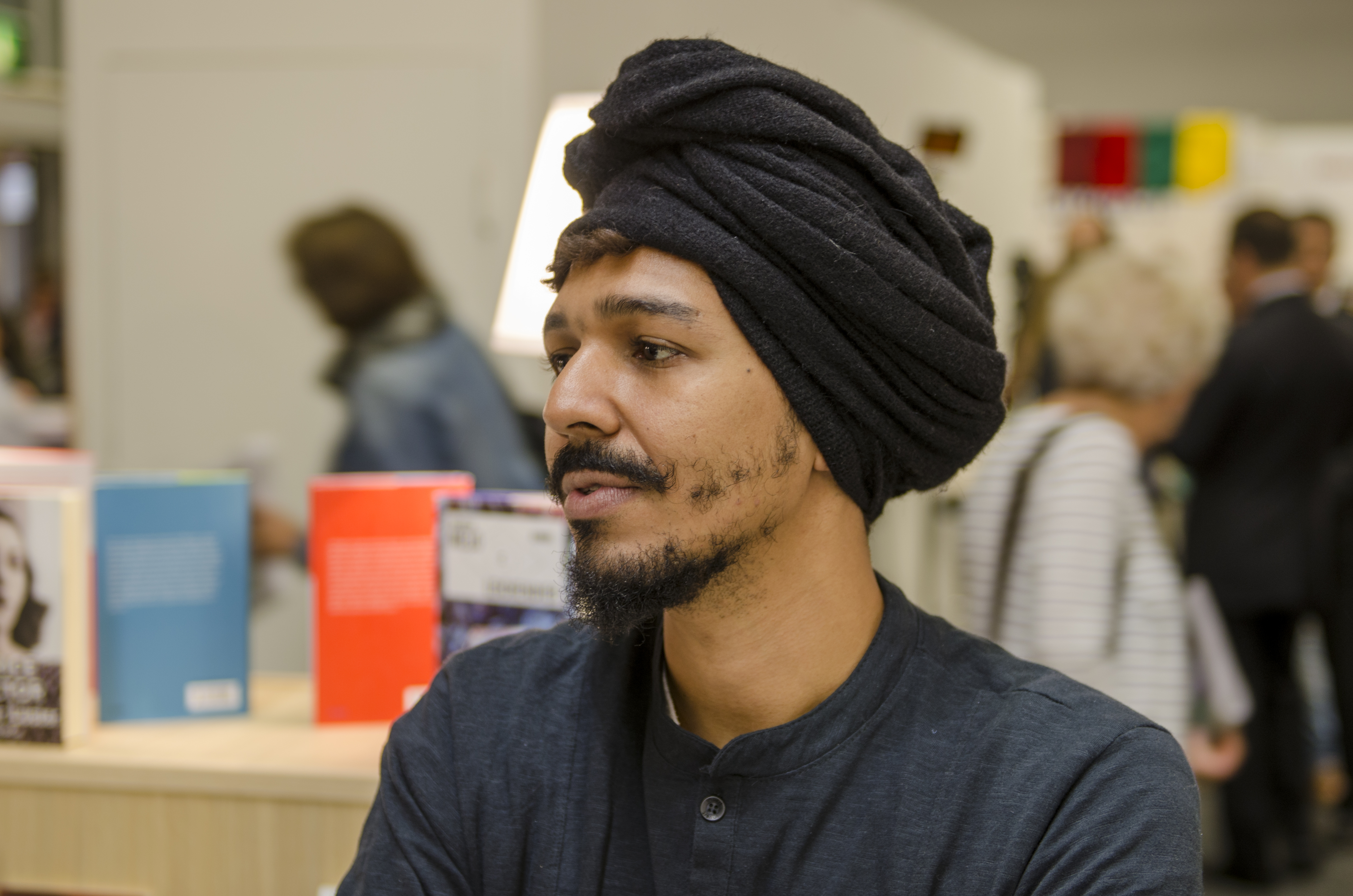
Jô Bilac in Gothenburg (2014)

Jô Bilac, (born 1985 as Giovanni Ramalho Bilac) is a Brazilian playwright, he debuted in 2006 as a professional playwright.

Bilac has an Indian father and a Brazilian mother and spent most of his childhood in Madrid, Spain. When he returned to Brazil he lived with his family in the Rio de Janeiro area of Urca and got his first contact with the world of theater with plays staged at the Colégio Andrews. Later he started studying theater at FAETEC in Niterói and also Escola de Teatro Martins Pena. At the age of nineteen he wrote his first play, Sangue na caixa de areia. In 2006 he made his debut as a professional playwright at the culture center Sérgio Porto with the play Bruxarias urbanas.

In 2007, he wrote the comedy Desperadas, the same year he made 2 p/ viagem and Cachorro!; the last one was played at the Companhia Teatro Independente. In 2008 Limpe todo sangue antes que manche o carpete a new play of Bilac was made at Teatro Solar de Botafogo.

In 2010, Bilac won the "Prêmio Shell"-award for his play Savana Glacial.

== Plays ==
- 2006 – Bruxarias urbanas
- 2007 – Desesperadas
- 2007 – 2 p/ viagem
- 2007 – Cachorro!
- 2008 – Limpe todo o sangue antes que manche o carpete
- 2009 – Rebú
- 2010 – Savana glacial*
- 2010 – O matador de santas
- 2011 – Serpente verde sabor maçã
- 2011 – Alguém acaba de morrer lá fora
- 2011 – O gato branco
- 2011 – Popcorn – Qualquer semelhança não é mera coincidência
- 2012 – Os mamutes
- 2012 – Cucaracha
- 2013 – Caixa de areia*
- 2013 – Petit monstre
- 2013 – Conselho de classe
