= Petar Jokić (basketball) =

Serbian basketball player

Free agent
- Position: Forward

Personal information
- Born: July 12, 1991 (age 35) Novi Sad, Serbia
- Listed height: 2.01 m (6 ft 7 in)

Career information
- NBA draft: 2013: undrafted
- Playing career: 2010–present

Career history
- 2010-2011: Novi Sad
- 2008–2012: Mega Vizura
- 2012–2014: Metalac Valjevo
- 2014–2015: Sloga
- 2015-2016: Šenčur
- 2016: Strumica

Petar Jokić (Serbian Cyrillic: Петар Јокић, born 12 July 1991) is a Serbian professional basketball player who last played for KK Strumica.
