= DJO =

DJO, Djo, or Djô may refer to:

- Djô, Portuguese futsal player
- DJO Global, manufacturer of medical devices
- DJO High School or Bishop Denis J. O'Connell High School
- Joe Keery, stage name Djo, American actor and musician

== People with the given name ==
- Djô d'Eloy, Cape Verdean singer
- Djo Issama Mpeko, footballer
- Djo Tunda Wa Munga, film director

== See also ==
- Novak Djokovic, Serbian tennis player
