= Dragan Đokanović =

Bosnian Serb politician, physician and sportsman (born 1958)

- Драган Ђокановић
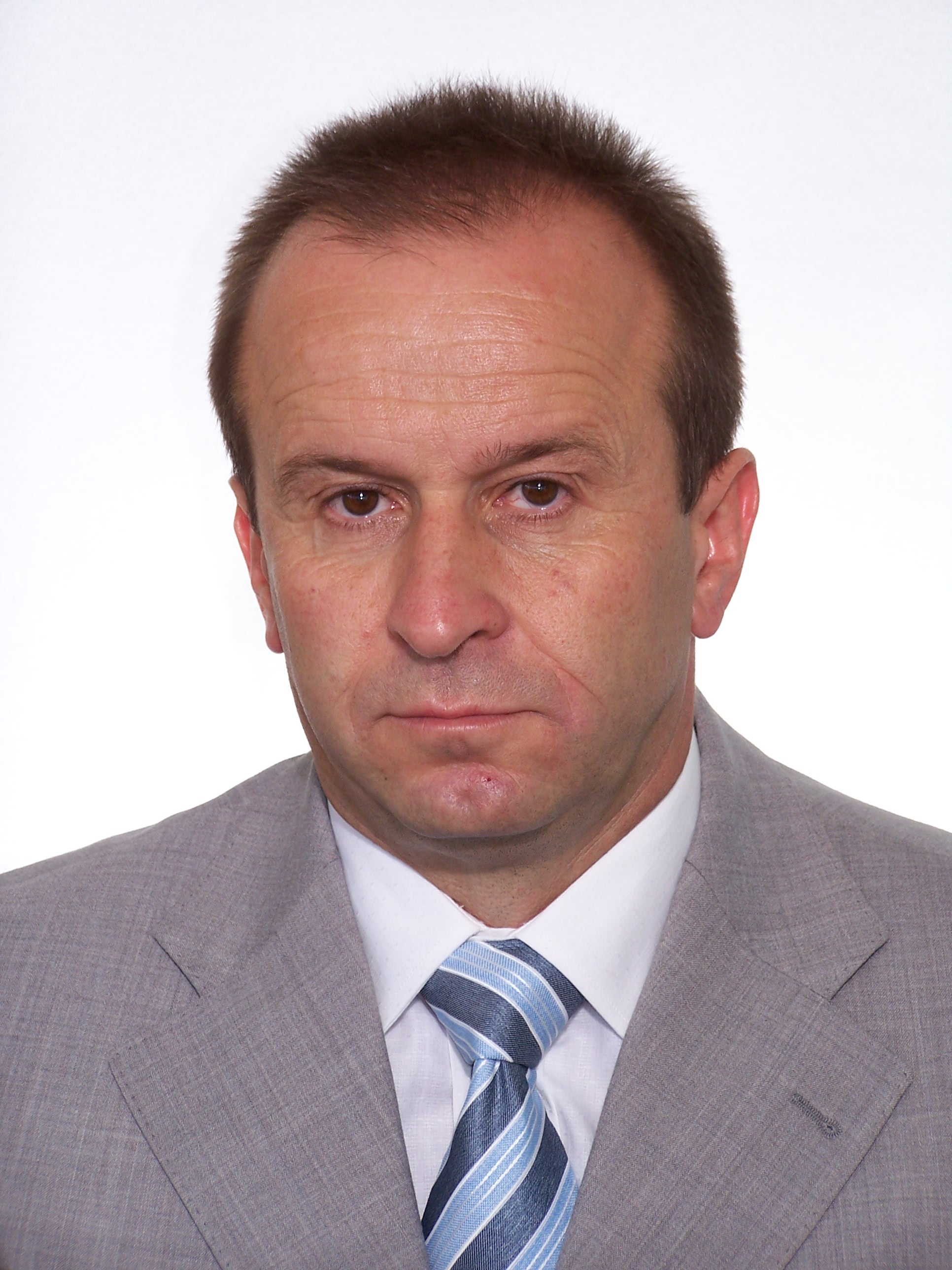
- Đokanović in 2008

President of the Democratic Party of Federalists
- Incumbent
- Assumed office 2 May 1990
- Preceded by: Office established

Personal details
- Born: 20 April 1958 (age 68) Sarajevo, PR Bosnia and Herzegovina, FPR Yugoslavia
- Party: Democratic Party of Federalists
- Spouse: Dragana Đokanović
- Children: Nikola, Aleksandar
- Education: University of Sarajevo (MB, MM, MD)

Dragan Đokanović (Serbian Cyrillic: Драган Ђокановић; born 20 April 1958) is a Bosnian Serb politician, member, founder and president of the Democratic Party of Federalists.

== Biography ==
Born on 20 April 1958, Đokanović completed all of his formal schooling in his hometown of Sarajevo, including university and medical school. He received his medical degree in 1984 from the University of Sarajevo. A pediatrician by medical specialty and training, he completed his residency in Pediatrics from 1988 to 1992. Đokanović worked in Zvornik, Šekovići, Belgrade and Sarajevo. He currently resides in Istočno Sarajevo and works at a children's medical clinic. He is married and has two sons.

== Political career ==
In May 1990, Đokanović formed the Democratic Party of Federalists. In November of that year, he was engaged in the campaign for the first multi-party elections in Bosnia and Herzegovina. In 1991, he was involved in activities in relation to preserving the Socialist Federal Republic of Yugoslavia as the only guarantee of peace in Bosnia. From the founding of the Assembly of the Serbian People of Bosnia and Herzegovina on 24 October 1991 Dragan Đokanović attended the sessions of the Assembly. He attended sessions of this Assembly until the summer of 1994.

In June 1992 he was appointed War Commissioner by the Presidency of the Serbian Republic of Bosnia and Herzegovina and he was responsible for the establishment of War Commissions in the municipalities of Vlasenica, Zvornik, Šekovići, Bratunac and Skelani. Dragan Đokanović informed the members of the Presidency that war crimes were taking place in those municipalities.

In March 2005, he was a witness at the war crimes trial of Momcilo Krajisnik at the International Criminal Tribunal for the former Yugoslavia in The Hague. From July 1992 to January 1993, Đokanović acted as an adviser to the War Presidency of the Serbian Republic. He advised the Presidency in relation to the establishment of Republika Srpska and relationship between the organs of the Republic from the Republic level to the Municipal level.

From January 1993 to Spring 1994, Đokanović was the Minister of War Veterans Affairs in Republika Srpska. At the beginning of 1994 he re-activated the Democratic Party of Federalists and established official contacts with the SPS party Slobodan Milošević.

In February 1995, Đokanović called a press conference and proposed a plan to end the war in Bosnia that was similar to the Dayton Agreement. After the Dayton accords at the beginning of 1996 he was involved in the preelection campaign. At this time, he attempted to prevent the Serbs of Sarajevo from leaving after the war, but he had great difficulties with the leaders of the SDS party Radovan Karadžić regarding this issue.

In January 1997, Đokanović moved to Belgrade, Serbia where he estsblished the Democratic Party of Federalists. The party was officially registered in 2003.

In December 2007, Đokanović was a candidate for President of Republika Srpska. He received 849 votes (0.21%).

== Sport career ==
Đokanović is an athlete. He was a gymnastic champion of Bosnia and Herzegovina and Yugoslavia (at the parallel bars, Novo Mesto (1975). In Sarajevo, there is a gymnastic club named "Dragan Đokanović".
