= Srđan =

- Pronunciation: Serbian pronunciation: [sr̩dʑan]
- Gender: male

Origin
- Origin: Slavic
- Region of origin: Bosnia and Herzegovina, Croatia, Montenegro, Serbia

Other names
- Alternative spelling: Srdjan
- Related names: Sergius

Srđan (Serbian Cyrillic: Срђан); pronounced [sr̩dʑan]; /sɜːrdʒɑːn/; sir-jahn) is a Serbo-Croatian masculine given name, usually written as Srdjan when the letter đ is unavailable.

It is usually considered to be a form of the name Sergius, honoring the Christian martyr and saint Sergius. In South Slavic, the saints Sergius and Bacchus are called "Sveti Srđ i Sveti Vlaho" or "Srđevdan". Another popular etymology derives it from the Serbo-Croatian verb "srditi" which means being angry, fiery or ardent. Alternatively it may derive from adjective "srdačan" which means having a good heart.

A medieval version of the name was Srdan. The most common nicknames are Srđa, Srđo, Srki or Srle.

== Notable people with the name ==
- Srđan Ajković (born 1991), Montenegrin footballer
- Srđan Aleksić (1966–1993), Bosnian Serb actor and anti-war hero
- Srđan Andrić (born 1980), Croatian footballer
- Srđan Babić (born 1996), Serbian footballer
- Srđan Bajčetić (born 1971), Serbian footballer
- Srđan Baljak (born 1978), Serbian footballer
- Srđan Blagojević (born 1973), Serbian football manager
- Srđan Blažić (born 1982), Montenegrin footballer
- Srđan Branković (born 1981), Serbian guitarist
- Srđan Budisavljević (1883–1968), Yugoslav politician and lawyer
- Srđan Čebinac (born 1939), Serbian footballer
- Srđan Cerović (born 1971), retired footballer
- Srđan Čolaković (born 1965), Yugoslav footballer
- Srđan Ćuković (born 1952), Serbian poet and composer
- Srđan Cvijić, Serbian political scientist
- Srđan Dabić (born 1962), Serbian basketball player and businessman
- Srđan Darmanović (born 1961), Montenegrin politician, diplomat and professor
- Srđan Dimitrov (born 1992), Serbian footballer
- Srđan Dizdarević (1952–2016), Bosnian journalist, diplomat, and activist
- Srdjan Djokovic (born 1961), Serbian entrepreneur and professional skier
- Srđan Dragojević (born 1963), Serbian film director and screenwriter
- Srđan Drašković (born 1991), Serbian footballer
- Srđan Đukanović (born 1980), Montenegrin footballer
- Srđan Flajs (born 1975), Serbian basketball coach
- Srđan Gašić (born 1975), Serbian footballer
- Srđan Gemaljević (born 1960), Serbian footballer
- Srđan Gjurković (born 1964), Croatian politician
- Srđan Golović (born 1967), Montenegrin footballer
- Srdan Golubović (born 1972), Serbian film director and university professor
- Srđan Grabež (born 1991), Serbian footballer
- Srđan Grahovac (born 1992), Bosnian footballer
- Srđan Grujičić (born 1987), Serbian footballer
- Srđan Hrstić (born 2003), Serbian footballer
- Srđan Jeković (born 1967), Serbian professional basketball player and coach
- Srđan Jovanović (born 1976), Serbian-Greek basketball player
- Srđan Jovanović (referee) (born 1986), Serbian football referee
- Srdjan Jovanovic Weiss (1967–2022), Serbian American architect
- Srđan Kalember (1928–2016), Serbian basketball player and coach
- Srđan Karanović (born 1945), Serbian film director and screenwriter
- Srđan Kljajević (born 1974), Montenegrin footballer
- Srđan "Srđa" Knežević (born 1985), Serbian footballer
- Srđan Kočić (born 1999), Bosnian basketball player
- Srđan Koljević (1966–2023), Serbian screenwriter and film director
- Srđan Kružević (born 1977), Serbian politician
- Srdjan Kurpjel (born 1971), Yugoslav musician
- Srđan Kusovac, Serbian-Montenegrin journalist and state administrator
- Srđan Kuzmić (born 2004), Slovenian footballer
- Srđan Lakić (born 1983), Croatian footballer
- Srđan Lopičić (born 1983), Montenegrin footballer
- Srdjan Luchin (born 1986), Romanian footballer
- Srđan Lukić (born 1981), Serbian footballer
- Srđan Majstorović (born 1972), Serbian political scientist
- Srđan Maksimović (born 1986), Serbian-Swiss professional footballer
- Srđan Marangunić (born 1943), Croatian chess player
- Srđan Marilović (1967–2013), Serbian sprint canoer
- Srđan Marjanović (born 1952), Serbian musician
- Srđan Mijailović (born 1993), Serbian footballer
- Srđan Miković (born 1961), Serbian politician
- Srđan Milić (born 1965), Montenegrin politician
- Srđan Miličević (born 1976), Bosnian table tennis player
- Srđan Milivojević (born 1965), Serbian politician
- Srđan Mrkušić (1915–2007), Serbian footballer
- Srđan Mrvaljević (born 1984), Montenegrin judoka
- Srđan Muškatirović (born 1972), Serbian tennis player
- Srđan Nogo (born 1981), Serbian politician
- Srđan Novković (born 1983), Serbian footballer
- Srđan Obradović (born 1970 in Belgrade), Serbian footballer
- Srđan Ognjanović, Serbian mathematician
- Srđan Ostojić (born 1983), Serbian footballer
- Srđan Pavlov (born 1984), Serbian footballer
- Srđan Pecelj (born 1975), Bosnian footballer
- Srđan Pilipović (born 1973), Serbian archer
- Srđan Pirivatrić (born 1966), Serbian historian and diplomat
- Srđan Plavšić (born 1995), Serbian footballer
- Srđan Popović (born 1978), Kosovar–Serbian politician
- Srđan Predragović (born 1995), Bosnian handball player
- Srđan Radonjić (born 1981), Montenegrin footballer
- Srđan Radosavljev (born 1983), Serbian footballer
- Srđan Radovanović (born 1959), Serbian lawyer and business executive
- Srđan Ristić (born 1992), Serbian footballer
- Srđan Rudić (born 1968), Serbian historian
- Srđan Šajn (born 1963), Serbian politician
- Srđan Šaper (born 1958), Serbian singer
- Srđan Savić (1931–2020), Yugoslav sprinter
- Srđan Savičević (born 1971), former Serbian footballer
- Srđan Simović (born 1985), Serbian footballer
- Srđan Slagalo (born 1966), Bosnian footballer
- Srđan Soldatović (born 1974), Serbian footballer
- Srđan Spasojević (born 1976), Serbian film director
- Srđan Spiridonović (born 1993), Austrian footballer
- Srđan Srdić (born 1977), Serbian novelist, writer and publisher
- Srđan Srećković (born 1974), Serbian politician
- Srđan Stanić (footballer, born 1982), Serbian footballer
- Srđan Stanić (footballer, born 1989), Bosnian footballer
- Srđan Subotić (born 1980), Croatian professional basketball player and coach
- Srđan Todorović (born 1965), Serbian musician and actor
- Srđan Urošević (born 1984), Serbian footballer
- Srđan V. Tešin (born 1971), Serbian writer and journalist
- Srđan Vasiljević (born 1973), Serbian football player and manager
- Srđan Verbić (born 1970), Serbian Minister of Education
- Srđan Vujaklija (born 1988), Serbian footballer
- Srđan Vujmilović (born 1994), Bosnian photographer
- Srđan Vuksanović (born 1992), Serbian-Kazakhstani water polo player
- Srđan Vuletić (born 1971), Bosnian film director
- Srđan Vulović (born 1965), Kosovo Serb politician
- Srđan Žakula (born 1979), Serbian footballer
- Srđan Živković (born 1986), Serbian basketball player
