= Savremena politika =

- Type: News website
- Publisher: Centre for Contemporary Politics
- Editor-in-chief: Nemanja Todorović Štiplija
- Deputy editor: Nikola Burazer
- News editor: Aleksandar Ivković
- Opinion editor: Sofija Popović
- Founded: 2025 (2017)
- Language: Serbian, English, French, German, Italian, Albanian, Macedonian, Russian
- Country: Serbia
- Sister newspapers: European Western Balkans
- Website: https://savremenapolitika.com/

Savremena politika (meaning “Contemporary Politics” in English) is a Serbian online news and commentary portal focused on the domestic and foreign policy of Serbia, as well as regional and international political developments relevant to Serbia and the Western Balkans.

== History ==
Savremena politika emerged as a continuation and rebranding of European Western Balkans – Srbija, a Serbian-language portal launched in 2017.

According to the portal’s launch text, the rebranding in 2025 was conceived as an expansion of the previous editorial concept, broadening the earlier focus on European integration to include a wider range of topics related to Serbian domestic politics, foreign policy, and regional affairs, while retaining coverage of European integration issues.

== Profile and editorial scope ==
The portal presents itself as a media outlet whose goal is to provide credible information and foster public discussion on contemporary political challenges. Its published structure includes sections for news, analyses, interviews, opinions, columns, comments, student contributions, infographics, and video content.

The homepage also contains a dedicated EWB section, indicating continued editorial linkage with the European Western Balkans brand and its coverage of European integration and enlargement-related topics.

== Columnists ==
The portal’s regular columnists include Boško Jakšić, a foreign policy commentator, former Yugoslav corresponded form the Middle East, whose column is titled Igre senki (Shadow Games); Jelena Obućina, editor and news anchor of the Dnevnik programme on TV Nova, one of the most popular TV personalities in Serbia, whose column is titled Prekid programa (Programme Interruption); Dušan Gajić, European correspondent from Brussels, whose column is titled Briselske beleške (Brussels Notes); and Dušan Milenković, a political consultant, whose column is titled Umetnost mogućeg (The Art of the Possible).

== Publisher ==
The publisher of Savremena politika is Belgrade based think-tank Centar savremene politike (Center for Contemporary Politics).
