= Belgrade Security Forum =

- Genre: conference
- Frequency: annually
- Location: Belgrade
- Country: Serbia
- Years active: 2011–present
- Founder: Belgrade Fund for Political Excellence; Belgrade Centre for Security Policy; European Movement in Serbia.
- Website: www.belgradeforum.org

Belgrade Security Forum (BSF; Serbian: Београдски безбедносни форум, romanized: Beogradski bezbednosni forum) is an international conference organized usually in September or October in Belgrade and brings together representatives of governments, academia and the non-governmental sector. Conference is jointly organized by the Belgrade Fund for Political Excellence, Belgrade Centre for Security Policy and European Movement in Serbia.

== History and Mission ==
The conference was launched in 2011 by the Belgrade Fund for Political Excellence, the Belgrade Centre for Security Policy (BCSP) and the European Movement in Serbia. The idea of the forum is to bring together all relevant stakeholders from the public administration, academia and the non-governmental sector of the Western Balkans, to exchange views and contribute to addressing ongoing issues in the region.

The key values and mission of the initiative is the following:

- Europe as a community of values, with a stronger foreign and security policy;
- The Balkans (South East Europe) as an actor and subject of global debates;
- Nurturing the greater and mutual instead of particular interests;
- Democratization of “high politics” by insisting on a culture of an inclusive dialogue;
- Debates that are topical and insightful;
- Autonomous, made by three civil society organizations.

== Editions of the forum ==
#	Date	Location	Theme	URL	Notable speakers
1.	14–16 September 2011	Veterans' Club Building in Belgrade	"The Balkans and Global Security: What Do We Have in Common, What Sets Us Apart?"	2011	Boris Tadić, Ivan Vejvoda
2.	20–22 September 2012	Hotel Hyatt Belgrade	”Coping with the crisis: challenges to democracy and security“	2012	
3.	19–21. September 2013	Hotel Hyatt Belgrade	"Is the State under (De) construction? Risks and Responses from the Balkans and Beyond”	2013	Ivica Dačić, Miroslav Lajčák, Aleksandar Vučić, Jiří Schneider, Ana Trišić-Babić, Theodor Winkler,
4.	30 September - 2 October 2014	Hotel Hyatt Belgrade	"Europe 2014: Closure and/or New Beginning?”	2014	Tanja Miščević, Marko Đurić, Gordana Čomić, Vladymir Baranovski, Samuel Žbogar, Karen Donfried, Iver B. Neumann, Elmar Brok
5.	30 September - 2 October 2015	Hotel Hyatt Belgrade	"Can Europe Redefine itself?"	2015	
6.	12–14 October 2016	Hotel Hyatt Belgrade	“Will Democracy Survive the Global Disorder?”	2016	Aleksandar Vučić, Edi Rama, Misha Gleny
7.	11–13 October 2017	Hotel Hyatt Belgrade	"Building a Common Future in the Age of Uncertainty"	2017	Aleksandar Vučić, Ana Brnabić, Rose Gottemoeller, Ivica Dačić, Igor Crndak, Christian Danielsson, Denis Keefe, Goran Svilanović, Florian Bieber, Steven Blockmans, Ardian Hackaj, Jovana Marović, Hedvig Morvai, Dejan Jović, Srđan Cvijić, Eleonora Poli, Milan Nič
8.	17–19 October 2018	Hotel Hyatt Belgrade	"Finding Answers Together to the New Normal"	2018	Alexander Van der Bellen, Aleksandar Vučić, Ana Brnabić, Sonja Licht
9.	16–18 October 2018	Belgrade			/

== Structure and time of the event ==
The forum is usually organized every year in September or October in Hotel Hyatt Belgrade. The even usually has several panels, round tables and presentations various halls. There is also academic event that precedes the main event. with speakers.

== Prizes and recognition ==
- 2015 PASOS Think-Tank Achievement of the Year Award, which is awarded for 2014 edition of the forum by The Policy Association for an Open Society.
