= Igor Bandović =

Serbian jurist and director of Belgrade Centre for Security Policy

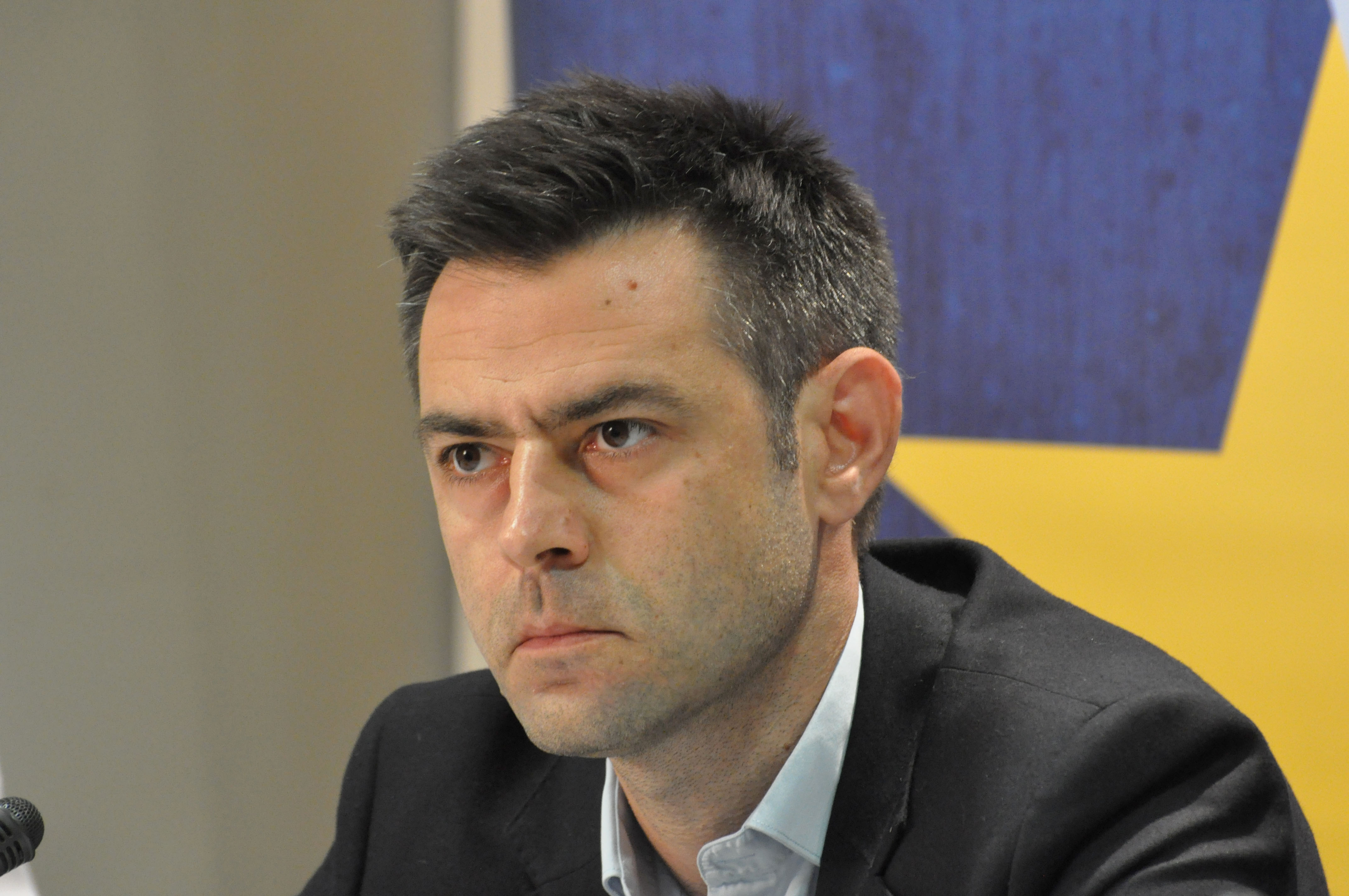
- Born: Игор Бандовић; 27 January 1977 (age 49); Užice, Socialist Federal Republic of Yugoslavia

Academic background
- Education: University of Belgrade

Academic work
- Institutions: Belgrade Centre for Security Policy
- Main interests: Nationalism civil society Human rights social activism Transnational justice war crimes

Igor Bandović (Serbian: Игор Бандовић; born 27 January 1977 in Užice, Socialist Federal Republic of Yugoslavia) is a Serbian jurist and Director of Belgrade Centre for Security Policy. Before that from 2008 until 2019, he was Senior Programme Manager for the European Fund for the Balkans.

== Biography ==
He was born on 27 January 1977 in Užice, where he finished Užice Gymnasium. He studied international law and international relations in Belgrade.

In 1997 he founded a non-governmental organization called "Libergraf", which promoted human rights and social activism through informal education. From 2002 to 2006 he worked as a researcher in Belgrade Centre for Human Rights, specializing in human rights, civil society and nationalism.

From 2006 to 2008 he worked for the International Organization for Migration and the United Nations Development Programme.

From 2009 to 2011 he worked in Gallup Balkan Monitor, a subsidiary of Gallup. From 2008 onward, he has been employed as a Senior Programme Manager for the European Fund for the Balkans. On 18 October 2019, during the closure of Belgrade Security Forum it was announced that he will become new director of Belgrade Centre for Security Policy, the role which he formally assumed in November 2019.

He is one of the coordinators of Balkan in Europe Policy Advisory Group and "Think and Link-Regional Policy Programme“.

== Selected publications ==
- Bandović, Igor (2004). Remarks of Igor Bandović. International War Crimes: Making a Difference?: Proceedings of an Interdisciplinary Conference at the University of Texas.
- Bandović, Igor (2004). Jureković, P.; Labbare, F.; Felerbauer, E.M. (eds.). "The International Role in the Reconciliation Process-A View from Serbia". From Peace Making to Self Sustaining Peace-International Presence in South East Europe at a Crossroads. Vienna: Akademiedruckerei Landesverteidigungsakademie.
- Nicić, Jovan; Bandović, Igor (2006). "Status of Transitional Justice in the Region". Regional Human Rights Report (1): 241–253.
- Bandović, Igor (2007). "The Role of Human and Minority Rights in the Process of Reconstruction and Consolidation for State and Nation–Building–the Case of Serbia". Human and Minority Rights in the Life-Cycle of Ethnic Conflicts. Belgrade: Belgrade Centre for Human Rights.
- Bandović, Igor (2009). Allcock, John B. (ed.). "The International Criminal Tribunal for the Former Yugoslavia".
- Bandovi', Igor; Vujačić, Marko (2014). Stratulat, Corina (ed.). "The European question in Serbia's party politics". EU Integration and Party Politics in the Balkans (September 2014). European Policy Center. ISSN 1782-494X.
- Žarković Rakić, Jelena; Stanković, Dejan; Bandović, Igor; Đukić, Mihajlo (2016). Implementacija naučnih rezultata u oblasti društvenih nauka u procesima kreiranja javnih politika u Srbiji (PDF). Beograd: Institut ekonomskih nauka.
