= Bandović =

Bandović (Serbian: Бандовић) is a surname. Notable people with the surname include:

- Božidar Bandović (born 1969), Montenegrin footballer and manager
- Dejan Bandović (born 1983), Bosnia and Herzegovina footballer
- Igor Bandović (born 1977), Serbian jurist
- Ljubomir Bandović (born 1976), Serbian actor
