= Dubravka Sekulić =

Professor, author and architect (born 1980)

- Born: 1980 (age 45–46); Yugoslavia
- Known for: Architectural research

Dubravka Sekulić (Serbian Cyrillic: Дубравка Секулић) is a professor, author and architect. Since 2016, she has taught at the "Institute of Contemporary Art", which is part of the Graz University of Technology in Austria. She is known for writing about privatization and its consequences on Belgrade's urban planning, stating that public space ought to be ".. a resource whose development should bring equality, not the basis for profit making". Her main field of research examines how modern cities change within the framework of spatial, legal and economic modalities.

== Biography ==
Sekulić was born in Niš, Yugoslavia and studied architecture at the University of Belgrade. She also studied design at the Jan van Eyck Academie in Maastricht. Starting in 2003, she began working as a teaching assistant with professor Ivan Kucina, for the Faculty of Architecture at the University of Belgrade. Many of her projects there involved dealing with architecture schools from around the world. She also focused on cataloging buildings that are located in Belgrade. In 2007, she participated in a project headed by Srdjan Jovanovic Weiss, at the "New Media Center_kuda.org" in Novi Sad, Serbia. In 2008, she was part of an exchange program between the same Novi Sad center and Germany's Akademie Schloss Solitude. That same year, she also investigated the effects of cultural dynamics on department stores in Serbia.

Sekulić has also curated several architecture exhibits in Belgrade and Zagreb. Her 2012 exhibition at Belgrade's Museum of Contemporary Art dealt with Yugoslavia's influence on African construction and was called "Three points of Support: Zoran Bojović, the Architect". The exhibit also became the basis of her doctorate, which she undertook the following year. She became a PhD fellow at the Swiss "Institute for History and Theory of Architecture", which is part of ETH Zurich university.

Part of her PhD project, Sekulić authored the 2013 work entitled "Constructing Nonalignment: The Work of Yugoslav Construction Companies in the Third World 1961-1989". She also wrote the book "Glotz nicht so romantisch! : on Extralegal Space in Belgrade", while living in the Netherlands. Additionally she is a co-author of the volume "Surfing the Black : Yugoslav Black Wave Cinema and its Transgressive Moments". She contributed to the collection of essays, "Nadogradnje – Urban Self-Regulation in Post-Yugoslav Cities", which was cited by Dezeen and ArchDaily as being one of the top architecture books of 2016.

Sekulić is a frequent lecturer, speaking at various conferences such as the 2017 symposium on Austrian writer Ernst Fischer. Regarding the effect of laws on public place, her presentation "How to Code Urban commons" was given in 2018 at the Architectural Association in London, England. She was also one of the presenters at the 2018 Venice Biennale of Architecture that took place in Italy. Sekulić is an amateur librarian helping in maintenance of feminist and space-race related literature in public libraries.
