= Cvejić =

Cvejić (Serbian Cyrillic: Цвејић) is a Serbian surname. Notable people with the surname include:

- Biserka Cvejić (1923–2021), Serbian opera singer and university professor
- Branko Cvejić (born 1946), Serbian actor

== See also ==
- Cvijić
