= Gašić =

Gašić (Serbian Cyrillic: Гашић) is a Serbian surname, a patronymic derived from Gaša or Gašo, diminutives of Gavrilo. It may refer to:

- Danijel Gašić (born 1987), Serbian footballer
- Srđan Gašić (born 1975), retired Serbian footballer
- Milan Gašić (born 1993), Serbian footballer
- Velimir Gašić (born 1964), Serbian basketball coach
- Bratislav Gašić (born 1967), Serbian politician and former Defence Minister
- Miroslav Gašić (born 1932), Serbian academic

== See also ==
- Gašević
- Gašović
