= Operation Eagle's Flight =

Montenegrin operation in 2006

- Operation name: Operation Eagle's Flight
- Type: Counterterrorism

Participants
- Executed by: Montenegrin police
- Countries participating: Montenegro; United States

Mission
- Target: Group of Albanians
- Objective: To prevent allegedly planned terrorist attacks and an armed conflict in Albanian-inhabited parts of Montenegro.

Timeline
- Date executed: 9 September 2006

Results
- Arrests: 17
- Convictions: 17

Operation Eagle's Flight (Montenegrin: Операција Орлов лет, romanized: Operacija Orlov let) was the name of an operation conducted by the Montenegrin police to arrest a group of Albanians who allegedly planned terrorist attacks and an armed conflict in Albanian-inhabited parts of Montenegro with the end goal of unification of Albanian majority areas to Albania or a Kosovo war style conflict. The group of 17 people allegedly planned operations from 2004 until their arrest on 2006.

== Operation ==
The group of 17 people was arrested by the Montenegrin police in 9 September, before the 2006 Montenegrin parliamentary election, on suspicion of terrorist actions and to create a separate Albanian region in Montenegro. United States assisted in carrying out the operation. Reportedly, the group was planning with the assistance of former members of the Kosovo Liberation Army to seize control of police stations, border crossing checkpoints between Montenegro and Albania, and all key institutions in Malësia, to expel the non-Albanian population and create an ethnic Albanian-controlled territory. The group was allegedly organised and funded by members of the Albanian diaspora based in Detroit, United States. Per the Montenegrin police, large amounts of firearms, explosive devices, and ammunition were found. Charges of criminal acts, terrorism, illegal possession of arms, and explosive materials were filed against the Albanians. Four of those who were arrested were American citizens.

== Aftermath and reactions ==
The group was given a total sentence of 51 years in prison by the High Court of Podgorica, which was later reduced to 49 years. Relations between the state and the Albanian minority strained after the event. Critics of the operation argued that the Montenegrin government used the incident to influence voters before the elections, which was rejected by the authorities. According to the lobby group Albanian American Civic League, the Albanians were victims of torture by the police, denied the right to a fair trial and there was a political conspiracy against them. On 17 October 2006, human rights group Amnesty International called on Montenegrin authorities to investigate the allegations against police officers suspected of torture. Albanian politicians claimed the operation was fabricated to "intimidate the Albanian population before the elections."

== Sources ==
- Bieber, Florian (30 September 2019). The Rise of Authoritarianism in the Western Balkans. Springer Nature. ISBN 978-3-03022-149-2.
- Laštro, Claudia; Bieber, Florian; Marović, Jovana (29 June 2023). "Mechanisms of Dominance: Understanding 30 Years in Power of Montenegro's Democratic Party of Socialists". Comparative Southeast European Studies. 71 (2). De Gruyter Oldenbourg: 210–236. doi:10.1515/soeu-2022-0039.
- Cross, S.; Kentera, S.; Vukadinovic, R.; Nation, R. (7 May 2013). Shaping South East Europe's Security Community for the Twenty-First Century: Trust, Partnership, Integration. Springer. ISBN 978-1-13701-020-9.
- Morrison, Kenneth (30 November 2008). Montenegro: A Modern History. I.B.Tauris. ISBN 978-0-85771-487-9.
