= Srđan Verbić =

Serbian physicist

- Срђан Вербић
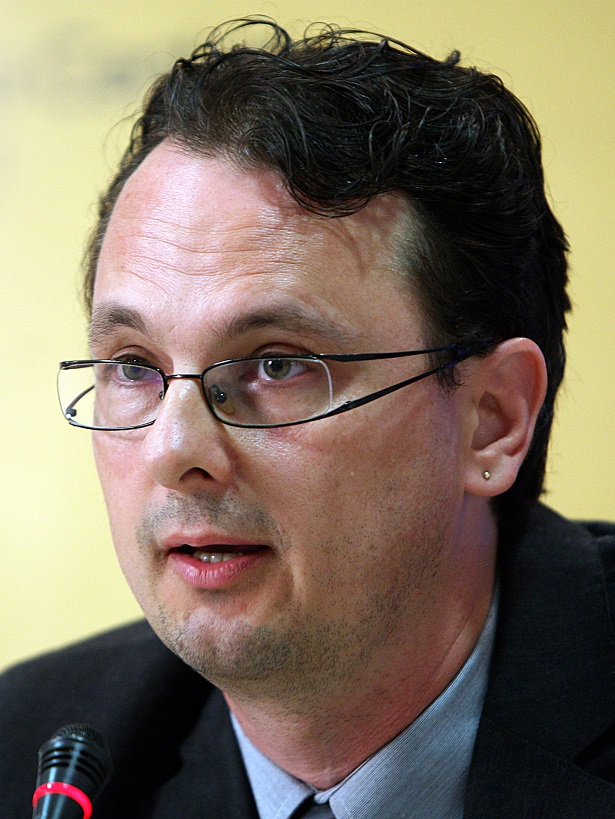
- Verbić in 2014

Minister of Education (Serbia)
- In office 27 April 2014 – 11 August 2016
- President: Tomislav Nikolić
- Prime Minister: Aleksandar Vučić
- Succeeded by: Mladen Šarčević
- Preceded by: Tomislav Jovanović

Personal details
- Born: Gornji Milanovac, PR Serbia, FPR Yugoslavia
- Education: University of Belgrade

Srđan Verbić (Serbian: Срђан Вербић) (born 1970, Gornji Milanovac) is a Serbian physicist, educator and minister of education of Serbia (2014–2016).

== Biography ==
He earned a degree in theoretical physics from the University of Belgrade. In 2001, he obtained a master’s degree with a thesis on artificial intelligence, and in 2014, he completed a Ph.D. with a dissertation on knowledge assessment tests, which he defended at his alma mater.

He served as the head of the physics program at the Petnica Science Center and, since 2003, has been involved in the international PISA research project. Beginning in 2005, he worked with the Institute for Education Quality and Evaluation in Serbia, initially as a coordinator and, from 2013 onward, as the director of its research center.

He is the author of several school textbooks on physics and has initiated numerous science popularisation projects.On 27 April 2014, upon the recommendation of the Serbian Progressive Party, he was appointed Minister of Education in the government of Aleksandar Vučić. He held this position until 11 August 2016.
