= Mihailo Jokić =

Serbian educator and politician

Mihailo Jokić (Serbian Cyrillic: Михаило Јокић; born 14 September 1948) is a Serbian educator and politician. He briefly served as Serbia's minister of education in a transitional government that was established after the fall of Slobodan Miloševic in 2000. Since 2016, he has served in the National Assembly of Serbia as a member of the Serbian Progressive Party.

== Early life and private career ==
Jokić was born in the village of Divci in Valjevo, in what was then the People's Republic of Serbia in the Federal People's Republic of Yugoslavia. He graduated in mathematics from the University of Novi Sad, worked as a maths professor at Valjevo's School of Economics, and earned a doctor of science degree in mathematics in 2000. In the late 1990s, he served as a deputy education minister in Serbia's government.

== Politician ==
=== Cabinet minister ===
After the fall of Yugoslav president Slobodan Miloševic in October 2000, a new transitional government was established in Serbia pending new elections. The ministry was led by Milomir Minić and included members of the Socialist Party of Serbia, the Democratic Opposition of Serbia, and the Serbian Renewal Movement. Jokić, at the time a member of the Socialist Party, was appointed as education minister. He served from 24 October 2000 to 25 January 2001, when a new administration took office under the leadership of Zoran Đinđić.

Jokić received the eighty-eighth position on the Socialist Party's electoral list in the 2000 Serbian parliamentary election. The party won thirty-seven seats, and he was not awarded a mandate. (Between 2000 and 2011, Serbian parliamentary mandates were awarded to sponsoring parties or coalitions rather than to individual candidates, and it was common practice for mandates to be assigned out of numerical order. Jokić's relatively low position on the list – which was in any event mostly arranged in alphabetical order – did not automatically prevent him from being awarded a mandate, though ultimately he was not included in the Socialist Party's parliamentary delegation.)

He subsequently left the Socialist Party and joined the Socialist People's Party, appearing on its electoral list in the 2003 parliamentary election. The list did not cross the electoral threshold to win any mandates in the assembly.

=== Municipal politics ===
Jokić has served a number of terms in the Valjevo municipal assembly. He contested the 2008 Serbian local elections at the head of the Socialist People's Party list in Valjevo and was returned when the list won three mandates. The Socialist People's Party subsequently ceased to exist, and he joined the Progressive Party.

He received the second position on the Progressive list in the 2012 Serbian local elections and was re-elected when the list won eleven seats. The Progressives participated in a local coalition government after the election, and Jokić was appointed as president (i.e., speaker) of the municipal assembly. Two years later, the Socialist Party formed a new local government without the Progressives (notwithstanding that the parties were aligned at the republic level), and the new administration removed Jokić from office. A court ruling later in the year restored him to the speaker's chair, but this ruling was subsequently overturned (on a provisional basis), and the matter remained unresolved until February 2016, when an administrative court returned him to the position once again. He did not seek re-election in the 2016 local elections.

=== Member of the National Assembly ===
Jokić was given the thirty-seventh position on the Progressive Party's Aleksandar Vučić – Serbia Is Winning list for the 2016 Serbian parliamentary election and was declared elected when the list won a landslide victory with 131 out of 250 mandates. During the 2016–20 parliament, he was a member of the committee on the judiciary, public administration, and local-self government; a member of the committee on education, science, technological development, and the information society; a deputy member of the committee on constitutional and legislative issues; deputy chair of a commission for the control of the execution of criminal sanctions; a member of Serbia's delegation to the parliamentary assembly of the Francophonie (where Serbia has observer status); and a member of the parliamentary friendship groups with Albania, Belarus, and Russia.

He received the one hundredth position on the Progressive Party's Aleksandar Vučić — For Our Children list in the 2020 election and was elected to a second term when the list won a landslide majority with 188 mandates. He continues to serve on the judiciary committee and is also a member of the committee on education, science, technological development, and the information society; a deputy member of the committee on finance, state budget, and control of public spending; and a member of the friendship groups with Belarus and Russia.
