= Milica Šterić =

Serbian architect

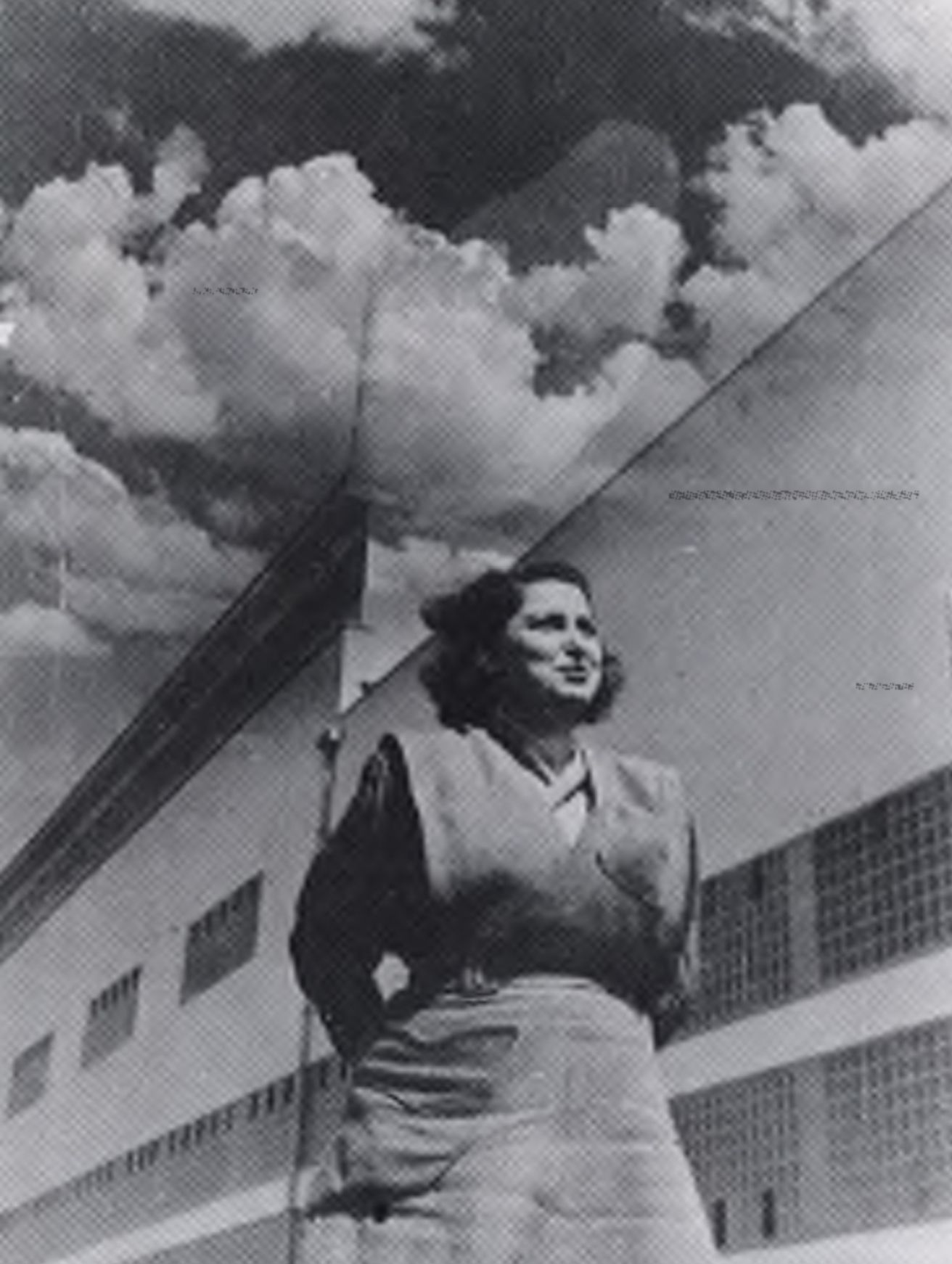
- Born: 1914; Smederevo, Serbia
- Died: 1998 (aged 83–84); Belgrade, Serbia, FR Yugoslavia
- Occupation: Architect
- Known for: Chief architect at Energoprojekt
- Notable work: Beobanka building; power plants built after WW2
- Website: http://aas.org.rs/steric-milica-biografija/

Milica Šterić (Serbian Cyrillic: Милица Штерић; 1914–1998) was a Serbian architect who worked at Energoprojekt for many years, founding and heading its architecture department. She is also responsible for many of the power plants built in Yugoslavia, which helped rebuild the country's economy after the Second World War. Known for her modernist approach, she is one of the first women in Serbia to undertake large scale architectural projects.

== Career ==
Šterić was born in Smederevo, Serbia and studied architecture in Belgrade, graduating in 1937.

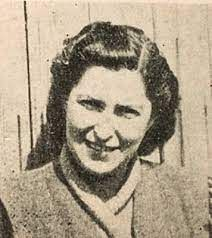
From early days

Once World War 2 was over, she was hired by Elektroistok in 1947. She then worked at Energoprojekt from 1951 until 1985, where she became their chief architect. She initially focused on constructing industrial and infrastructural buildings for both companies, designing several power plants throughout Yugoslavia. In 1957, Šterić spent half a year in the Netherlands working at the architectural firm Van den Broek and Bakeme where she learnt more about the Bauhaus style. After returning to Serbia, she applied her new skills and built a commercial building on Carice Milice 2 street. Constructed in 1957, the building's facade is a combination of steel and glass, underscored by horizontal bands of windows. Just down the road, Šterić also built the headquarters of Energoprojekt in 1960, which later became the seat of Beobanka. It was the first structure in Belgrade with free standing pillars and a transparent glass facade.

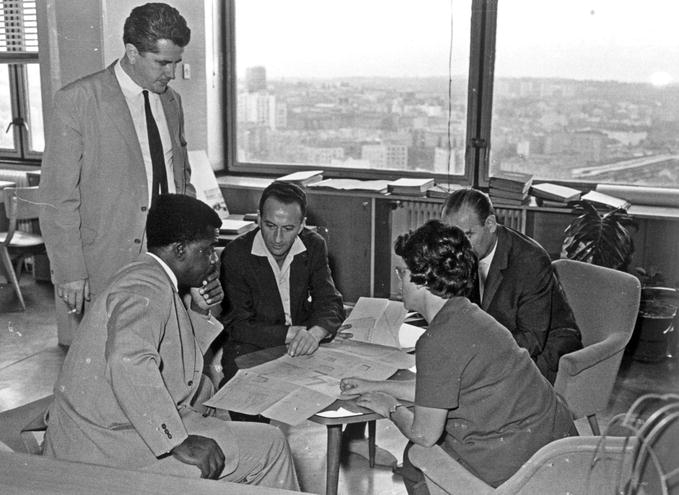
Milica Šterić on a meeting with her team and investors

== Awards and honours ==
In 1984, Šterić received the "Grand prix d'architecture" from the "Union of Architects of Serbia". In 1994, she was a member of the committee that created the "Academy of Architecture of Serbia" the following year. In 2015, the "Belgrade International Architecture Week" festival organized a walking tour of Belgrade buildings that were constructed by women architects such as Šterić. That same year, she was one of several female pioneers reviewed in the book "Women in Architecture - Contemporary architecture in Serbia since 1900".

Šterić's Beobanka building will be transformed into an eco-center sometime in 2018. Located in the Zeleni Venac neighbourhood, the structure won her the Sedmojulska nagrada (7th Prize award for architecture) when it was built. In 2018, Šterić and other Yugoslav architects will be the focus of an exhibition at the New York Museum of Modern Art (MoMA) called "Towards Concrete Utopia: Architecture in Yugoslavia, 1948-1980".

== Architectural and urban accomplishments ==
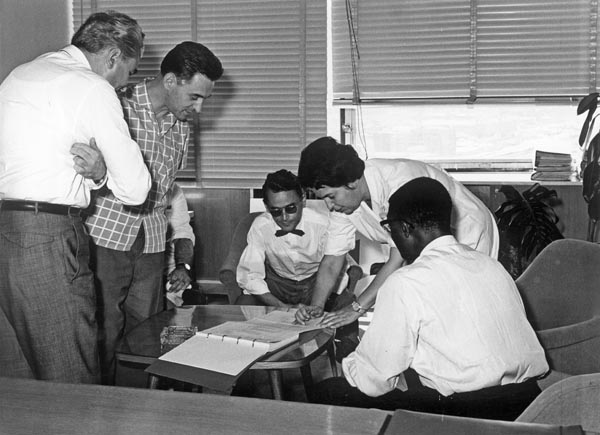
Milica Šterić on a meeting with her team and investors

- Thermal power plant Mali Kostolac
- Power plant in Lucani near Guča (1955)
- Power plant in Crnjani on Kolubara, with restaurant and settlement (1957)
- Heating plant on the left bank of the Sava in New Belgrade (1965, damaged in the bombing of Belgrade in 1999)
- Multi-storey office building of "Energoprojekt" (later Beobanka) on the corner of Carica Milica and Brankova streets in Belgrade (1956–60)
- Residential building in Alekse Nenadović Street in Belgrade (1958–59)
- Three-story building of Social Insurance in Smederevo (with B. Petrović, 1958)
- Residential building in Ulica 17. oktobar in Smederevo (1965)
- Department store in Smederevo (with A. Keković, 1971)
- Complex of residential buildings in Smederevo (1975–85)
- Children's institution in Smederevo (1978–80)
- House of Culture in Smederevo (1978–1990)
- Complex of ministerial buildings in Kano, in Nigeria (with Z. Bojović, 1970–72)
- Bedouin settlement in Kuwait with 5,000 houses (with D. Bakić and Z. Jovanović, 1971–74)
- Chimpata Military Settlement in Zambia (1970)

== Gallery ==
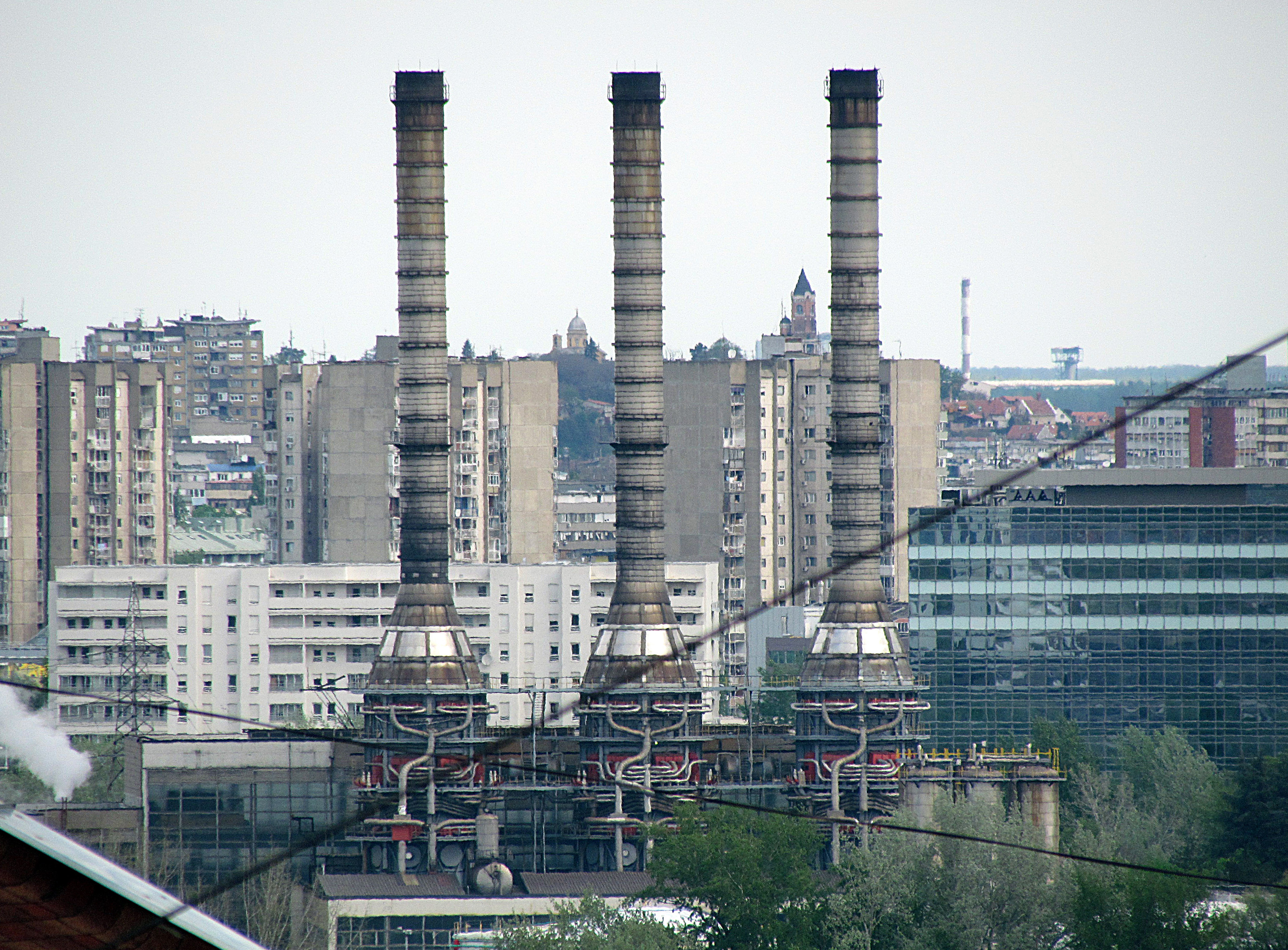
Heating plant „Novi Beograd”

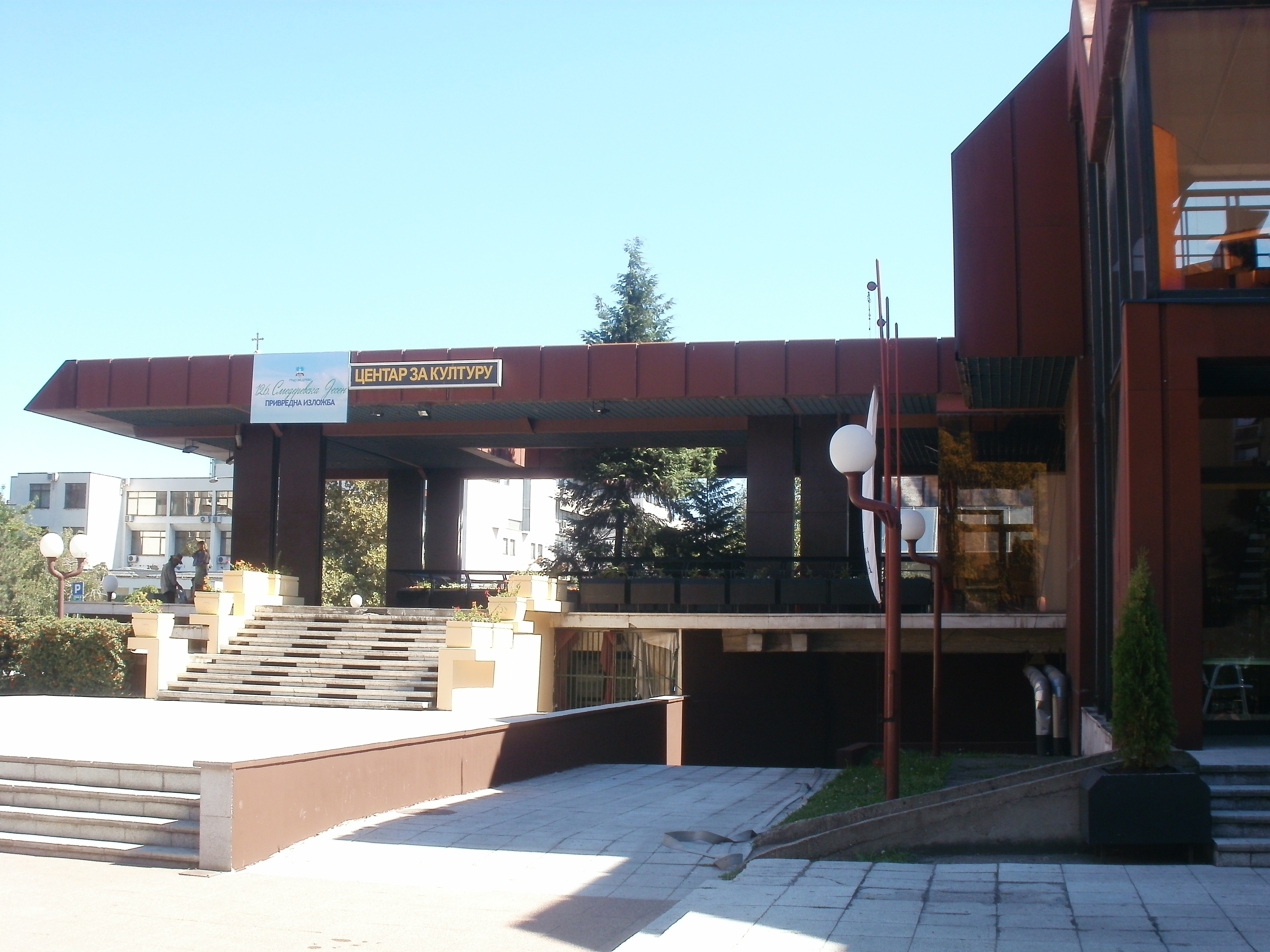
House of culture in Smederevo

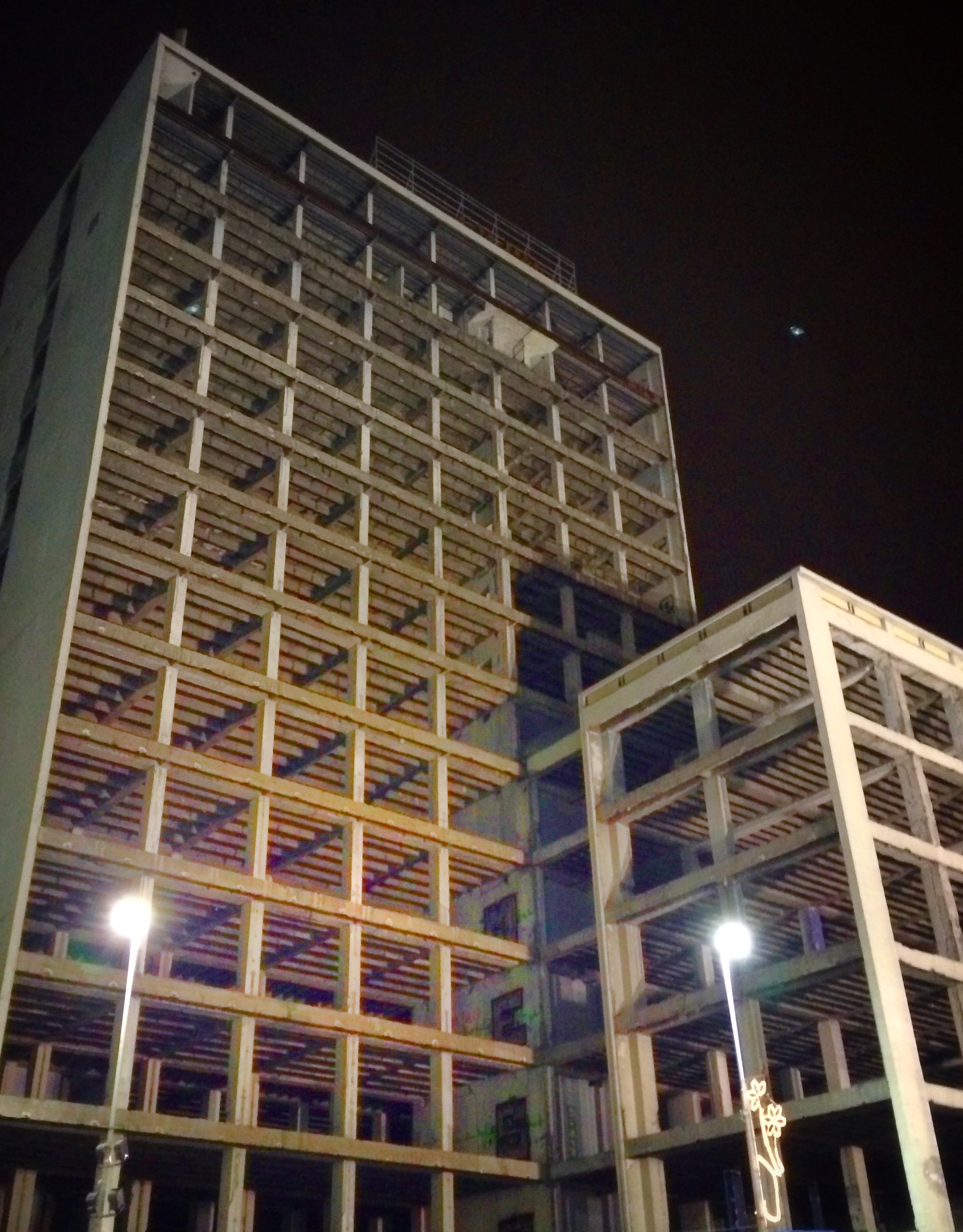
Beobanka building (2014).
