= Cvijić =

Cvijić is a Serbian surname, and may refer to:

- Dragana Cvijić (born 1990), Serbian handball player
- Jovan Cvijić (1865–1927), Serbian geographer
- Srđan Cvijić (21st century), Serbian political scientist
