= Nikola Burazer =

Serbian political scientist

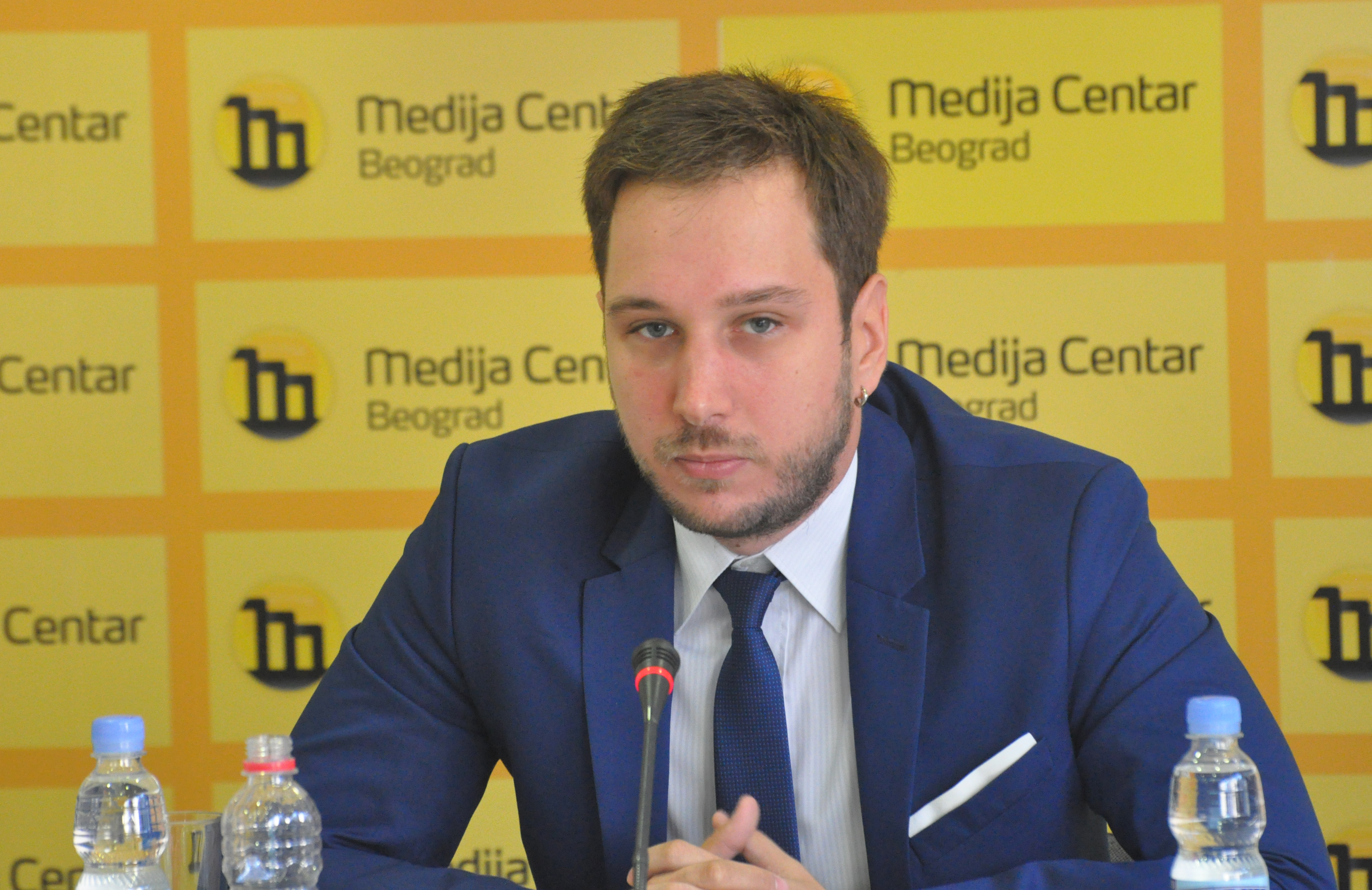
- Born: Никола Буразер; 22 July 1988 (age 38); Belgrade, SR Serbia, Yugoslavia

Academic background
- Education: University of Belgrade; Central European University

Academic work
- Institutions: Centre for Contemporary Politics; European Western Balkans
- Main interests: minorities and minority rights European integration Belgrade–Pristina negotiations Democracy

Nikola Burazer (Serbian: Никола Буразер; born 22 July 1988) is a Serbian political scientist, journalist, program director of Center for Contemporary Politics and executive editor of European Western Balkans.

== Biography ==
He was born on 22 July 1988 in Belgrade where he finished elementary school "Borislav Pekić" and Seventh Belgrade Gymnasium.

In 2011, he graduated in political science at the University of Belgrade Faculty of Political Sciences, and successfully defended his MA thesis "From Segmentation to Dissolution: The Segmental Institutions Thesis and the Case of Yugoslavia” at the Central European University in Budapest.

During 2013 he was a researcher at the Forum for Ethic Relations in Belgrade, where he did a research on the normalization of relations between Kosovo and Serbia. In July 2015, he became an executive editor at the European Western Balkans portal and the program director of Center for Contemporary Politics.

From September to December 2015, he was a researcher at the Institute for Development and International Relations in Zagreb. During 2017, he was a teaching course "Nationalism and Ethnic Conflicts in the Balkans" at the Mathias Corvinus Collegium in Budapest.

From December 2017 until February 2018 he was a research fellow at the Balkans in Europe Policy Advisory Group (BiEPAG). In September 2018, he co-authored and promoted the shadow report "State of Democracy in Serbia 2018". He coauthored with Đorđe Bojović publication "Agreement on Comprehensive Normalization of Relations between Serbia and Kosovo – Political and Legal Analysis" in November 2018.

== Selected bibliography ==
- Đorđe, Bojović; Burazer, Nikola (2018). Agreement on Comprehensive Normalization of Relations between Serbia and Kosovo – Political and Legal Analysis (PDF). Belgrade: Center for Contemporary Politics. ISBN 978-86-80576-07-7.
- Burazer, Nikola; Ivković, Aleksandar (2018). State of democracy in Serbia 2018 (PDF). Belgrade: Center for Contemporary Politics.
- Burazer, Nikola; Hackaj, Krisela; Shehaj, Ardita; Stefanovski, Ivan (2017). Democracy in Progress: shadow reporton political Copenhagen criteria in Western Balkans EU candidate states (PDF). Beograd: Centar savremene politike. ISBN 978-86-80576-04-6. Archived from the original (PDF) on 23 October 2018.
- Burazer, Nikola (2016). Reforma sistema reprezentacije nacionalnih manjina u Narodnoj skupštini Republike Srbije (PDF). Beograd: Centar savremene politike. ISBN 978-86-80576-03-9.
- Burazer, Nikola (2016). "Strategies of Symbolic Nation-Building in South Eastern Europe". Croatian International Relations Review. 21 (74): 104–107.
- Burazer, Nikola, ed. (2016). Future of the Dialogue: Normalization of Relations with Kosovo and the European Integration of Serbia. Belgrade: Center for Contemporary politics.
- Burazer, Nikola (2015). Overview of the EU Negotiated Dialogue between Belgrade and Pristina (PDF). Belgrade: Center for Contemporary Politics.
- Burazer, Nikola (2015). From Segmentation to Dissolution: The Segmental Institutions Thesis and the Case of Yugoslavia (Master Dissertation) (PDF). Budapest: Central European University. Archived from the original (PDF) on 23 October 2018.
- Burazer, Nikola (2014). Petrović, Nikola (ed.). Zbirka predloga praktičnih politika perspektive mladih lidera (PDF). Beograd: The International and Security Affairs Centre (ISAC Fund).
