= Srđan Majstorović =

Serbian political scientist

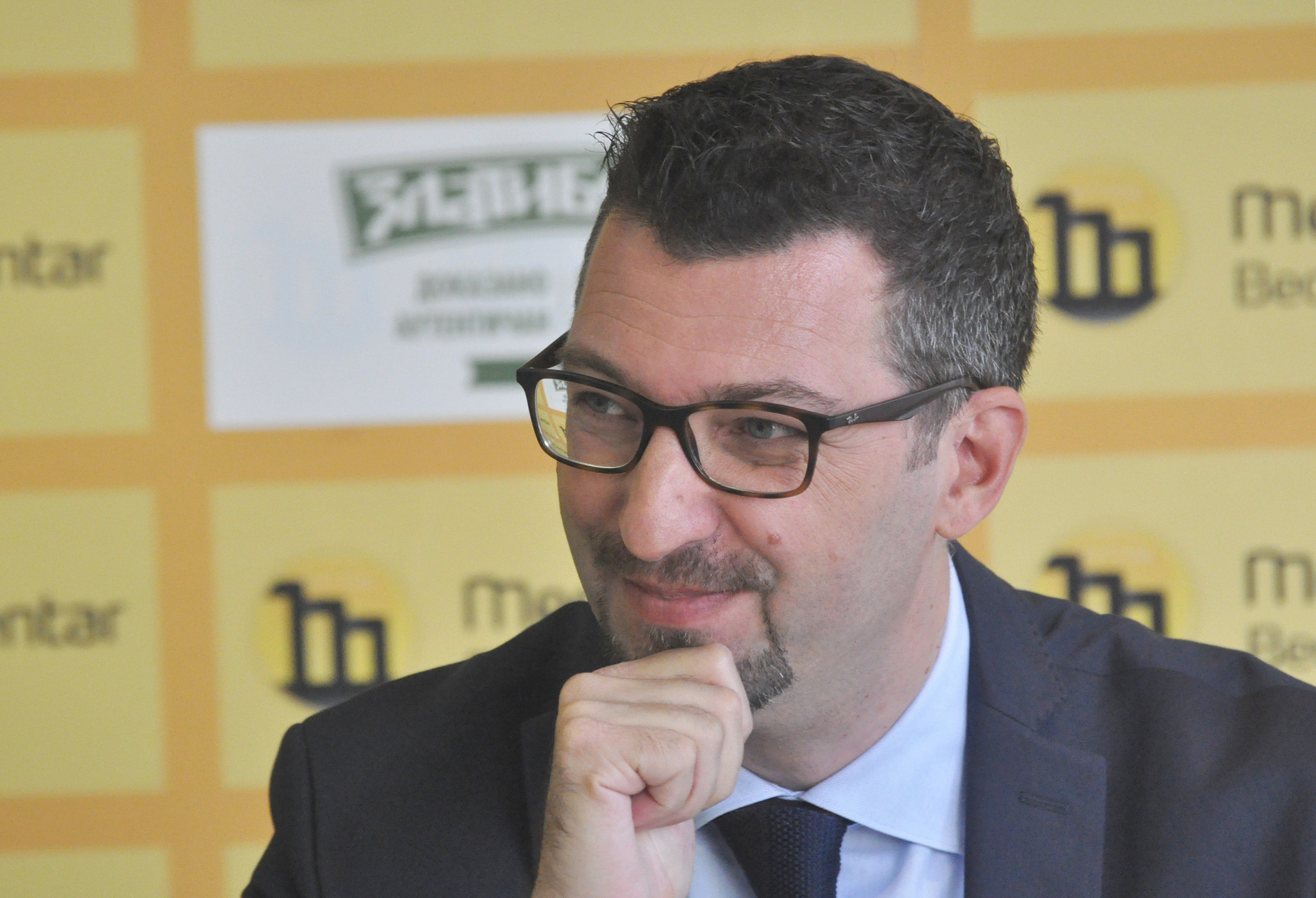
- Born: Срђан Мајсторовић; 13 June 1972 (age 54); Pula

Academic background
- Education: University of Graz; University of Belgrade Faculty of Political Science

Academic work
- Institutions: Center for European Policy
- Main interests: European integration of Serbia western Balkans

Srđan Majstorović (Serbian: Срђан Мајсторовић; (13 June 1972) was born in Pula, SFR Yugoslavia, He is a Serbian political scientist who is an expert in the European integration of Serbia and the Western Balkans. He is the current chairman of the governing board of the European Policy Centre.

== Biography ==
Majstorović graduated from the Department of International relations at the University of Belgrade Faculty of Political Sciences and received his MA degree at the University of Graz Karl-Franzens Faculty of Law, Department of European Integration and Regionalism.

After graduation, he worked as the assistant teacher of European Studies and Civil Society at the Belgrade Open School from 1997 until 2001.

During the period between 2001 and 2003 he was employed in the sector for European Integration and Regional Multilateral Cooperation in the Federal Ministry for International Economic Relations of the Federal Republic of Yugoslavia. He then worked in the sector for European Integration in Republic of Serbia's Ministry of Foreign Economic Relations between 2003 and 2004. He participated in the creation of Serbia's national strategy for the accession of Serbia and Montenegro to the European Union which was published in July 2005.

He was a member of the Government of Serbia's negotiating team and participated in negotiations on the conclusion of the Stabilization and Association Agreement between the European Union and the Republic of Serbia. He became a member and the deputy chairperson of the Commission for the Implementation of the National Judicial Reforms Strategy for the period 2002–2018. In August 2015 he was named a member of the negotiating team to negotiate the accession of the Republic of Serbia to the European Union where he is in charge of political criteria and Chapter 23 of the negotiations which concern: judicial reform, anti-corruption policy, fundamental rights and the rights of EU citizens.

He became chairman of the governing board of the European Policy Centre on 12 October 2017. Majstorović is also one of the visiting lecturers on the staff of the University of Belgrade Faculty of Law.

He is also a member of the Balkans in Europe Policy Advisory Group (BiEPAG).

Occasionally he publishes texts for the European Western Balkans portal.

== Private life ==
He speaks English and to some extent Italian and French. Majstorović is married and has two children.

== Selected publications ==
- Majstorović, Srđan (2018). "2018 – godina povratka verodostojne Politike proširenja EU?" (PDF). CEP Dijalog. Centar za evropske politike.
- Marić, Sena; Majstorović, Srđan (2017). "Transparentnost i tajnost u pregovorima o pristupanju EU" (PDF). CEP Dijalog. Centar za evropsku politiku.
- Miščević, Tanja; Međak, Vladimir; Simović, Saša; Majstorović, Srđan; Engelman, Andrej (2017). Guidelines for Preparing a Negotiating Position. Belgrade: Vlada Republike Srbije Pregovarački tim za vođenje pregovora o pristupanju Republike Srbije Evropskoj uniji. ISBN 978-86-920985-0-5.
- Miščević, Tanja; Majstorović, Srđan; Marković Ilić, Kalina; Milenković Bukumirović, Aleksandra; Knežević, Ivan; Mrak, Mojmir; Horvat, Andrej; Matijašević, Nebojša (2017). Analytical Support Function for the Accession Negotiations of the Republic of Serbia to the European Union. Belgrade: Deutsche gesellschaft für internationale zusammenarbeit (GIZ).
- Međak, Vladimir; Majstorović, Srđan (2015). Regionalna politika Evropske unije. Beograd: Vlada Republike Srbije, Kancelarija za pridruživanje Evropskoj uniji.
- Majstorović, Srđan; Bikić, Sonja; Međak, Vladimir; Mrvaljević, Sanja; Marković Tomić, Milica; Savić Janjić, Nataša; Vitorović, Olivera (2014). Bukvar evropskih integracija. Beograd: Vlada Republike Srbije, Kancelarija za evropske integracije. ISBN 978-86-84979-36-2.
- Majstorović, Srđan (1996). "Gertjan Dijkink: National identity and geopolitical visions: maps of pride and pain". Montenegro Journal of Foreign Policy: 103–106.
