= Jovana Marović =

Montenegrin politician

- Jована Маровић
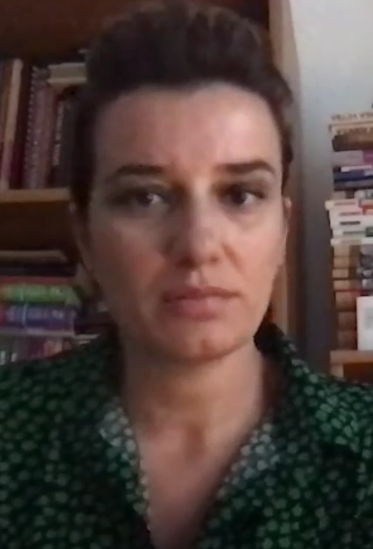

Deputy Prime Minister for Foreign Policy, European Integration and Regional Cooperation and Minister for European Affairs of Montenegro
- In office 28 April 2022 – 25 November 2022
- President: Milo Đukanović
- Prime Minister: Dritan Abazović

Personal details
- Born: 10 October 1977 (age 48) Kotor, Socialist Republic of Montenegro, Socialist Federal Republic of Yugoslavia
- Party: United Reform Action
- Education: University of Belgrade (PhD)

Jovana Marović (Montenegrin: Jована Маровић; born 10 October 1977) is a Montenegrin politician of the a pro-European and green political party United Reform Action (URA). She was Deputy Prime Minister and Minister of European Affairs of the Government of Montenegro in 2022. She was a member of the Balkans in Europe Policy Advisory Group (BiEPAG) from 2015 to 2021.

== Biography ==
Marović was born on 10 October 1977 in Kotor, Socialist Republic of Montenegro in the Socialist Federal Republic of Yugoslavia. She holds a PhD from the University of Belgrade.

Marović is a member of the pro-European and green political party United Reform Action (URA). She was a member of the Balkans in Europe Policy Advisory Group (BiEPAG) from 2015 to 2021 and worked in the Montenegrin Accession Negotiations for European Union (EU) membership. She was Chief Executive Director (CEO) of the Podgorica-based think tank Politikon Network.

Marović became Deputy Prime Minister (DPM) for Foreign Policy, European Integration and Regional Cooperation and Minister of European Affairs of the Government of Montenegro in April 2022. While Minister, in May 2022 she spoke at the "Re-thinking the Western Balkans EU Integration in the New Geopolitical Context" event in the French Senate, Paris, France, about opening accession negotiations with Albania and North Macedonia and ongoing reforms in Montenegro for European integration and encouraging the rule of law. She met with Ambassadors from countries such as Austria, Bulgaria, Kosovo, Turkey and Hungary, as well as visiting Brussels with Prime Minister of Montenegro, Dritan Abazović, to meet with EU officials. She visited Kosovo in October 2022.

Marović resigned from all government positions in November 2022, due to Prime Minister Abazović's refusal to consider the risks of the Open Balkan initiative and other policy disagreements. She continues to advocate for signing an accession treaty to join the EU.

In August 2023, while travelling to a conference in Požega, Marović was denied entry to Serbia at the Nikola Tesla Airport in Belgrade "for the sake of protection of the security of the Republic of Serbia and its citizens." She was also banned from entering Serbia until further notice and her passport was taken from her (it was later returned). The ban on Marović from entering Serbia was condemned by the President of Montenegro, Jakov Milatović, Montenegrin opposition parties and Serbian civil society organizations (CSOs). The Ministry of Foreign Affairs of Montenegro requested an explanation from the Serbian government for her deportation and statements were released by the Eurorpean Fund for the Balkans and the Regional Academy for Democratic Development. Serbian Member of Parliament for the Serbian Progressive Party, Vladimir Djukanovic, defended the ban and said that German politician Viola von Cramon should also be banned from entering Serbia.

In 2024, Marović spoke at an event commemorating the 10th anniversary of the establishment of the Balkans in Europe Policy Advisory Group (BiEPAG). She was a guest on the French Pretres podcast.
