= Marija Obradović =

Marija Obradović may refer to:

- Marija Obradović (handballer)
- Marija Obradović (politician)
