= Zoran Bojović (architect) =

Serbian architect and engineer

Zoran Bojovic
- Born: 1936; Belgrade, Kingdom of Yugoslavia
- Died: 2018 (aged 81–82); Belgrade, Serbia
- Occupation: Architect
- Known for: Large scale architectural projects in Africa
- Notable work: International Fair in Lagos, State Secretariat in Kano state

Zoran Bojovic (Serbian Cyrillic: Зоран Бојовић; 1936–2018) was a Yugoslav and Serbian architect and engineer who undertook many large scale projects abroad. He is known for his constructions in Nigeria and the Middle East.

== Career ==
Bojovic was born in Belgrade and graduated from the Faculty of Architecture at the University of Belgrade. In 1961, he was hired by Energoprojekt, a Serbian construction and infrastructure company, where he held a prominent role until his retirement in 1998. As lead architect for the company, he worked in Europe, Africa, Asia and South America.

Known for a modernist approach, his portfolio includes industrial facilities and sports complexes, as well as power plants, large housing complexes and urban public spaces. He produced the plans for the International Fair in Lagos, which was attended by American president Jimmy Carter, and co-designed the State Secretariat in the Nigerian state of Kano with fellow architect Milica Šterić. He is also responsible for the overall urban planning of seven cities in Kanou. Additionally, he worked in Iraq and built Baghdad's Al Qulaf Housing and Business Center.

Bojovic had to address every aspect of his projects, including hydro-power, nuclear energy and aerodynamics. Regarding the design of the triad aerodynamic tunnel in Žarkovo, he ended up modifying the machinery to reduce pressure and noise, thus resulting in a better constructed tunnel. Bojovic credits his father, a mechanical engineer, for his interest in the technical sciences.

Bojovic belonged to the "Academy of Engineering Sciences of Serbia", the "Academy of Architecture of Serbia", the "Applied Artists and Designers Association of Serbia", and the "Serbian Chamber of Engineers".

== Awards and distinctions ==
Bojovic was the recipient of several awards, such as the "Special Award" at the 1984 Belgrade Architecture Salon. The following year, he received the "Belgrade Jubilee Medal" for his architectural contributions to the city. At the second Belgrade Triennial of World Architecture, he was ranked as one of the city's twelve prominent architects. He also won the "Lifetime Achievement Award" from the Serbian Chamber of Engineers in 2013.

Bojovic was the subject of a 2012 exhibition held at Belgrade's Museum of Contemporary Art that examined Yugoslavia's influence on African construction. The exhibit also became the focus of a Phd thesis written by architectural researcher Dubravka Sekulić. Along with other Yugoslav architectural works, Bojovic's African constructions will be highlighted in a 2018 exhibition at the New York Museum of Modern Art (MoMA) called "Towards Concrete Utopia: Architecture in Yugoslavia, 1948-1980".
