= Centre for Contemporary Politics =

Non-profit organization founded in Belgrade

- Центар савремене политике
- Logo of the Centre
- Formation: May 2012.
- Founder: Nemanja Todorović Štiplija
- Founded at: Belgrade, Serbia
- Type: Regional policy think tank
- Headquarters: Belgrade
- Region served: Western Balkans
- Methods: Organization of various events and activities; publishing; analysis
- Official language: Serbian; English
- President: Nemanja Todorović Štiplija
- Program Director: Nikola Burazer
- Subsidiaries: European Western Balkans

The Centre for Contemporary Politics (Serbian: Центар савремене политике) is an independent, non-governmental and non-profit organization founded in Belgrade in May 2012. The centre is a think tank focused on a range of fields, including reforms of the political system, foreign affairs and security, as well as protection of human and minority rights. The centre's primary mission is to enact reforms to the political system that protect human and minority rights, as well as ensure a safe and fair integration of Serbia into greater Europe. Operating as a think-tank, the Centre for Contemporary Politics conducts assessments and analyses on the various political issues facing the region, including political integrity, national security, and human rights. It develops and proposes objective strategies to deal with threats to the region's political and social fabric, regional stability and cooperation and protection through PR and public awareness campaigns, community forums and youth leadership training.

The Centre for Contemporary Politics aims to foster reforms and Serbia's European integration process as well as regional stability and cooperation. In order to achieve this, the centre engages in various activities, such as organizing forums, PR activities, youth training camps, maintaining the political portal European Western Balkans. The centre's headquarters are in Belgrade, Serbia.

== Structure and mission ==
The Centre for Contemporary Politics engages in the following activities in order to realize its goals:

- Creation of policies and recommendations in a range of fields
- Drafting proposals for political and social reform
- Conducting analyses and studies on various political and social issues
- Raising awareness of and advocating for necessary reforms, European integration and contemporary key issues currently confronting the state and society
- Reporting on European integration and other key political processes that are insufficiently known or understood by the wider public

Nemanja Todorović Štiplija is the centre's president; its Program Director is Nikola Burazer.

== Projects ==
=== European Western Balkans ===
The centre owns and runs a portal, European Western Balkans (EWB), which aims to report on the European integration processes of several Western Balkan countries (Serbia, Croatia, BiH, North Macedonia, Albania, Montenegro and Kosovo), conduct interviews and publish various texts. As part of the project, the organization maintains a network of various people and experts from across these countries as well as EU member states.

=== National Assembly of the Republic of Serbia and European Integration ===
Through its portal EWB, the centre has actively monitored the work of the Committee for European Integration of the National Assembly of Serbia and the Joint Committee of the European Parliament and National Assembly of the Republic of Serbia for stabilization and association from April to October 2015.

=== Clear on Europe conference ===
The center organized a conference, ″Clear on Europe″, which took place in Belgrade on October 20, 2015. The conference addressed the Belgrade-Priština dialogue and integration into the EU. The conference was organized in partnership with the Konrad Adenauer Stiftung and its participants were Serbian MPs and representatives of the non-governmental sector and the media. The conference was opened by Axel Dittman, German ambassador to Serbia. Other participants included Joanna Hanson, researcher at the London School of Economics, Marko Đurić, director of the Office for Kosovo and Metohija, the deputy of the Kosovar Government President Branimir Stojanović, Ilir Deda, Kosovar MP.

One of the panels brought together Serbian and Kosovar liaison officers Dejan Pavićević and Valdet Sadiku. Participants of the event were Borislav Stefanović, former representative of the Belgrade-Priština dialogue, and Vjosa Osmani of the Committee for European Integration in the Kosovar Parliament. They voiced different opinions about the admittance of Kosovo into the UNESCO. Stefanović proposed that Kosovo should be part of international organisations, but not the UNESCO, because it would not be able to protect the Serbian heritage, while Osmani asserted that membership in UNESCO will "directly impact on improving standards in the field of education, protection of cultural monuments."

As part of the conference, the centre published a preview of the Belgrade-Priština dialogue in Serbian and English.

=== Youth and the EU ===
In January 2016, the centre used funds provided by Erasmus+ to organize a training course about institutions of the EU and European Integration for young participants from Italy, Spain, Belgium, Slovakia, Croatia, Albania, Bulgaria, Macedonia and Turkey. The participants visited the National Assembly of the Republic of Serbia and the EU information centre. They also participated in a simulation of the work of the European Parliament at Municipalitie Stari Grad. It was the aim of the project to empower those involved to debate, discuss and promote EU citizenship, European values, integration, and enlargement; and to engage in the active participation as citizens in the EU in decision-making processes within the EU.

=== Debates about the European future of Serbia ===
In partnership with the Konrad Adenauer Stiftung, the centre has published interviews regarding the future of the Western Balkans with key representatives of the German Christian Democratic Union (CDU) and the European People's Party (EPP) since May 2015. So far, they have conducted over 20 interviews with various people related to the integration of the Western Balkans, including Sebastian Kurz, Jadranka Joksimović, Peter Sørensen, Samuel Žbogar, David McAllister, Majlinda Bregu, Johannes Hahn and Mladen Ivanić. Furthermore, the EWB website features various op-ed pieces and articles written and published by a range of experts in the same field.

=== European Parliament and Serbia ===
In 2016 portal together with European Western Balkans and Konrad Adenauer Foundation published a guide in Serbian language "Evropski parlament i Srbija" (European Parliament and Serbia) with the aim of helping Serbian MP's understanding how European Parliament works. The promotion of the guide took place in National Assembly of Serbia and the speakers were David McAlister and Maja Gojković.=
