= Mladen Šarčević =

Serbian politician

- Младен Шарчевић
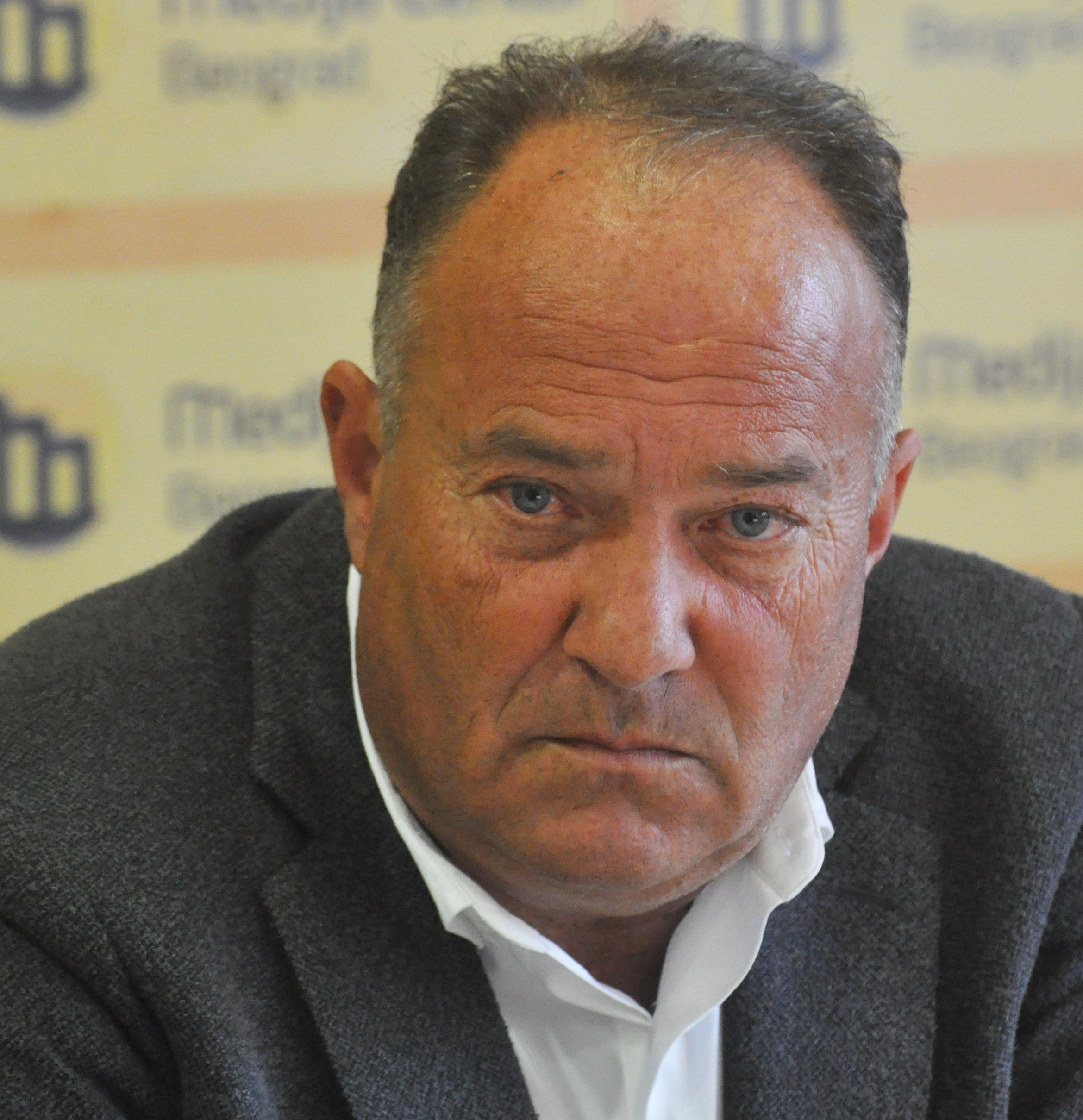

Minister of Education, Science and Technological Development
- In office 11 August 2016 – 28 October 2020
- Prime Minister: Aleksandar Vučić; Ivica Dačić (acting); Ana Brnabić
- Preceded by: Srđan Verbić
- Succeeded by: Branko Ružić

Personal details
- Born: 22 January 1957 (age 69) Belgrade, PR Serbia, FPR Yugoslavia
- Party: Independent
- Education: University of Belgrade

Mladen Šarčević (Serbian Cyrillic: Младен Шарчевић, born 22 January 1957) is a Serbian politician who served as the minister of education, science and technological development from 2016 to 2020.

== Biography ==
He was born in Belgrade, where he finished elementary school and high school. After finishing primary and secondary school, he graduated from the Faculty of Mathematics - Department of Geography. He completed his postgraduate studies at the Center for Multidisciplinary Studies of the University of Belgrade - Department of Environmental Protection.

At the age of 33, he became the principal of the elementary school "Nikola Tesla" in Belgrade. He participated in the establishment of many public schools. He is the founder of several private schools, both in Serbia and in the Balkans. Šarčević is the founder of the "Ruđer Bošković" educational system.

In August 2016, he became the Minister of Education, Science and Technological Development of the Republic of Serbia. Since then, all his activities in the "Ruđer Bošković" educational system have been frozen.

He remained minister in the government of Serbia until 28 October 2020. He was soon after appointed as the special adviser for education to president of Serbia, Aleksandar Vučić. In January 2023, he was appointed acting director of the Official Messenger.

== Controversies ==
After appearing on Radio Television of Serbia, talking about peer violence in schools, he stated that some children have a writing "beat me" on their foreheads. This provoked sharp criticism in public. Shortly afterwards, numerous LGBT rights organisations criticised him after he said that every teacher who "incites homosexuality and teaches children to be genderless beings" will be punished.
