= Nemanja Todorović Štiplija =

Serbian political scientist

- Born: Nemanja Todorović; 15 October 1984 (age 42); Vranje, Socialist Federal Republic of Yugoslavia
- Other name: N. T. Štiplija

Academic background
- Education: Masters in European politics
- Alma mater: Masaryk University

Academic work
- Institutions: Centre for Contemporary Politics; European Western Balkans
- Main interests: European integration Heraldry

Nemanja Todorović Štiplija (Serbian: Немања Тодоровић Штиплија; sometimes abbreviated as N. T. Štiplija; born 15 October 1984) is a Serbian political scientist, heraldic and social activist. He is one of the founders of the Centre for Contemporary Politics and the European Western Balkans, where he is also the editor-in-chief.

== Early life ==
Nemanja Todorović Štiplija was born in Vranje, Socialist Federal Republic of Yugoslavia, on 15 October 1984, where he finished his elementary schooling and went to local gymnasium, Bora Stanković. Originally, Štiplija is a family nickname based on a Macedonian town, Štip, from which his ancestors originate. Štiplija holds a bachelor's degree in Finances and Banking from the Belgrade Banking Academy (Institute of Economic Sciences) and a master's degree in European politics from the Masaryk University in Brno, Czech Republic.

After finishing his studies, he worked for several years in the public relations sector. He also worked with the government of the Republic of Serbia for two years, as an external adviser. From 2014 to 2015, he worked in Brussels.

== Career ==
He founded the Centre for Contemporary Politics with a group of enthusiasts on 9 May 2012. Two years later on 9 May 2014, the organization started the web portal European Western Balkans with Štiplija as its editor-in-chief. Its primary focus is the coverage of European integration of the Western Balkans. In 2014, Vranje's OK Radio awarded him the title of "Best citizen of Vranje" (Serbian: Нај Врањанац) for his social activism.

In May 2015, he became the external adviser to the International and Security Affairs Center (ISAC) Fund. The following year, he authored the publication European Parliament and Serbia: Role of European Parliament in European accession process of Serbia (Serbian: Европски парламент и Србија: улога Европског парламента у процесу приступања Републике Србије Европској унији). The publication was aimed at the Members of Parliament of the Serbian Parliament and their better understanding of the European Parliamentary working. Promotion of the book was held on 20 September 2016, in the Serbian National Assembly building, with speakers David McAlister and Maja Gojković.

Štiplija was a columnist of the Vranjske weekly newspaper and wrote about the local political and social life of Vranje. Currently, he is the periodical columnist of the Serbian daily newspaper, Danas. He is also a member of the working group for Chapter 30 and 31 of the National Convention on the European Union.

Štiplija is also a heraldry artist. Together with Nikola Salatić and Dalibor Stanojković, Štiplija created Vranje's coat of arms and flag.

== Publications ==
- Todorović Štiplija, Nemanja (2016). Европски парламент и Србија: улога Европског парламента у процесу приступања Републике Србије Европској унији [European Parliament and Serbia. Role of European Parliament in European accession process of Serbia ] (PDF). Belgrade: Center for Contemporary Politics. ISBN 9788686661807.
- Shentov, Ognian (2018). The Russian Economic Grip on Central and Eastern Europe. Milton Park: Routledge. ISBN 9781351109376.
- Novaković, Igor; Todorović Štiplija, Nemanja (2020). Privilegovani prijatelj: Kakve koristi ima Srbija od prodaje RTB-a Bor? (PDF). Belgrade: Center for Contemporary Politics. ISBN 9788680576114.

== See also ==
- Center for Contemporary Politics
- European Western Balkans
