= Florian Bieber =

Luxembourgish political scientist

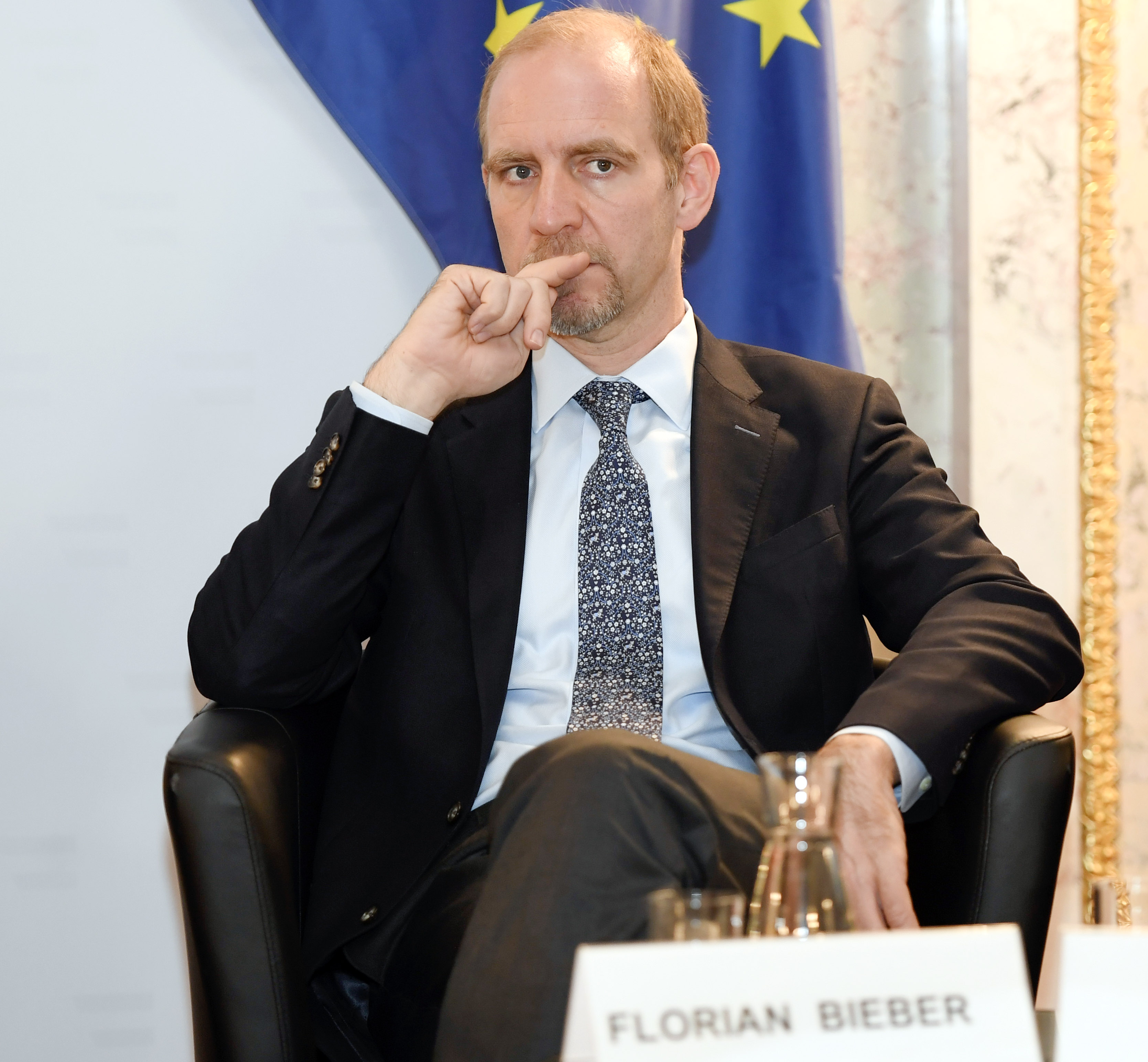
- Born: 4 October 1973 (age 53); Luxembourg

Academic background
- Education: University of Vienna
- Thesis: Serbian Nationalism from the Death of Tito to the Fall of Milošević (2001)

Academic work
- Institutions: University of Graz
- Main interests: Inter-ethnic relations ethnic conflict Nationalism minorities and minority rights multi-ethnic states
- Website: florianbieber.org

Florian Bieber (born 4 October 1973) is a Luxembourgish political scientist, historian and professor working on inter-ethnic relations, ethnic conflict and nationalism, focusing primarily on the Balkans.

== Education ==
In 1991–1992, Bieber studied history, political science, economics, and languages at Trinity College (Hartford, Connecticut). He received a magister degree in history and political science with honors on the topic "Bosnia-Herzegovina and Lebanon: A comparative Study“ in 1997.

In 1998, Bieber received a M.A. in Southeastern Studies at Central European University in Budapest on the topic "The Rise of Serbian Nationalism in the 1980s“, and in 2001, he earned a Ph.D. with honours on the topic “Serbian Nationalism from the Death of Tito to the Fall of Milošević.”

== Career ==
His academic career began at the Central European University, where he was Assistant and Instructor from 1998 until 2000. From 2001 until 2002 he was Regional Representative at the European Center for Minority Issues in Belgrade and Sarajevo and at the same centre he became Project Advisor in 2002.

He was Collaborating Researcher at United Nations Research Institute For Social Development on the project "Ethnic Structure, Inequality and Governance of the Public Sector 2002–2005" and published a book in 2006 "Post-War Bosnia: Ethnicity, Inequality and Public Sector Governance".

He became a lecturer in East European Politics at University of Kent's Department of Politics and International Relations in 2006 until 2010. He became professor for Southeast European History and Politics at the University of Graz in 2010 and in 2011 he also became the director of the Center for Southeast European Studies. Currently he is vice-president of the Association for the Study of Nationalities and coordinates the work of the Balkans in Europe Policy Advisory Group.

Furthermore, he has taught at Cornell University, the University of Bologna, and the University of Sarajevo, and has been a visiting fellow at the London School of Economics.

In an article published on Balkan Insight, Bieber wrote about the criticism and the labels he has faced from the ruling party of Serbia. He has been labeled, among other things, an "on-duty Serb-hater", "propagandist", and "professor of hatred and propaganda" in the Serbian media, following his criticism of the Serbian government for its handling of the COVID-19 pandemic in Serbia and other issues. Marko Đurić, senior member of the ruling party, has called for Bieber to be declared persona non grata. According to Bieber, such slurs say more about the politics of the Serbian Progressive Party than about him.

== Editorial work ==
He is also editor-in-chief of the open access journal Contemporary Southeastern Europe. He is in editorial board of Global Security, Ethnopolitics, Südosteuropa, Političke perspective (Serbo-Croatian for Political Perspectives), Migracijske i etničke teme (Croatian for Migration and ethical themes), European Autonomy and Diversity Papers.

== Publications ==
He has authored and co-authored dozens of books, journal articles, and news columns. His works include minorities and minority rights issues, as well as multi-ethnic states, nationalism, and ethnic conflict in Southeast Europe (especially the Western Balkans). In 2017, he has signed the Declaration on the Common Language of the Croats, Serbs, Bosniaks and Montenegrins.

=== Books ===
- Bieber, F. (2026). Was Autokraten fürchten. Aufstand in Serbien und die Krise autoritärer Regime [What autocrats fear. The uprising in Serbia and the crisis of authoritarian regimes]. Ch. Links.
- Bieber, F. (2026). Hvar in the Modern Age. Identity and Change in Southeast Europe. Bloomsbury.
- Bieber, F. (2023). Pulverfass Balkan Wie Diktaturen Einfluss in Europa nehmen [Powderkeg Balkans. How dictatorships gain influence in Europe]. Ch. Links.
- Bieber, F. & Bieber, R. (2021). Negotiating unity and diversity in the European Union. Palgrave.
- Bieber, F. (2020). Debating Nationalism. The Global Spread of Nations. Bloomsbury.
- Bieber, F. (2020). The Rise of Authoritarianism in the Western Balkans. Palgrave.
- Bieber, F., Galijaš, A. & Archer, R. (2014). Debating the end of Yugoslavia. Routledge.
- Bieber, F. (2005). Post-war Bosnia: Ethnicity, inequality and public sector governance. Palgrave.
- Bieber, F. (2005). Nationalismus in Serbien vom Tode Titos bis zum Ende der Ära Milošević [Serbian Nationalism from the Death of Tito to the Fall of the Milošević] (Vol. 18). LIT Verlag Münster.
- Bieber, F., & Daskalovski, Ž. (Eds.). (2003). Understanding the war in Kosovo. Frank Cass.
- Bieber, F. (1999). Bosnien-Herzegowina und der Libanon im Vergleich. Historische Entwicklung und Politisches System vor dem Bürgerkrieg [Bosnia and Herzegovina and Lebanon in Comparison. Historical development and political system before the war], Sinzheim.
