= Srđan Drašković =

Serbian footballer

Personal information
- Full name: Srđan Drašković
- Date of birth: 8 January 1991 (age 35)
- Place of birth: Kraljevo, FR Yugoslavia
- Height: 1.91 m (6 ft 3 in)
- Position: Centre-back

Team information
- Current team: Borac Čačak
- Number: 5

Youth career
- Bubamara Kraljevo
- Čukarički
- BASK

Senior career*
| Years | Team | Apps | (Gls) |
| 2009 | BASK | 1 | (0) |
| 2010–2011 | Zvižd | | |
| 2011–2012 | Srem | 1 | (0) |
| 2012–2014 | Bane | 50 | (1) |
| 2014–2015 | Zvižd | 43 | (2) |
| 2016 | Šumadija 1903 | 14 | (0) |
| 2016 | Victoria Wanderers | | |
| 2017–2018 | ČSK Čelarevo | 22 | (0) |
| 2018–2021 | Sileks | 80 | (3) |
| 2022 | Sloga Požega | | |
| 2023 | FAP | | |
| 2024– | Borac Čačak | 50 | (5) |
- * Club domestic league appearances and goals as of 14 May 2026

Srđan Drašković (Serbian Cyrillic: Срђан Драшковић; born 8 January 1991) is a Serbian footballer who plays for Borac Čačak.

== Club career ==
Born in Kraljevo, Drašković started playing football in the local academy Bubamara, after which moved to youth categories of Čukarički. Finally he joined BASK, making a single appearance in the 2009–10 Serbian League Belgrade campaign. Next he moved to the Dunav Zone League side Zvižd, where he stayed between 2010 and 2011. Later he played with Srem and Bane until 2014, when returned to Zvižd. During the second spell with the club, Drašković also captaining team in 2015. At the beginning of 2016, Drašković moved to Šumadija 1903, where he spent the rest of the 2015–15 season in the Serbian League West. In summer 2016, Drašković moved to the Maltese side Victoria Wanderers, where he affirmed as a goal poacher in the 2016–17 Maltese FA Trophy, scoring a twice in the third round 5–0 victory over Mġarr United. In summer 2017, Drašković signed with Serbian First League club ČSK Čelarevo, playing in the 2017–18 season until relegation to the Serbian League Vojvodina.
