= Srđan Vujmilović =

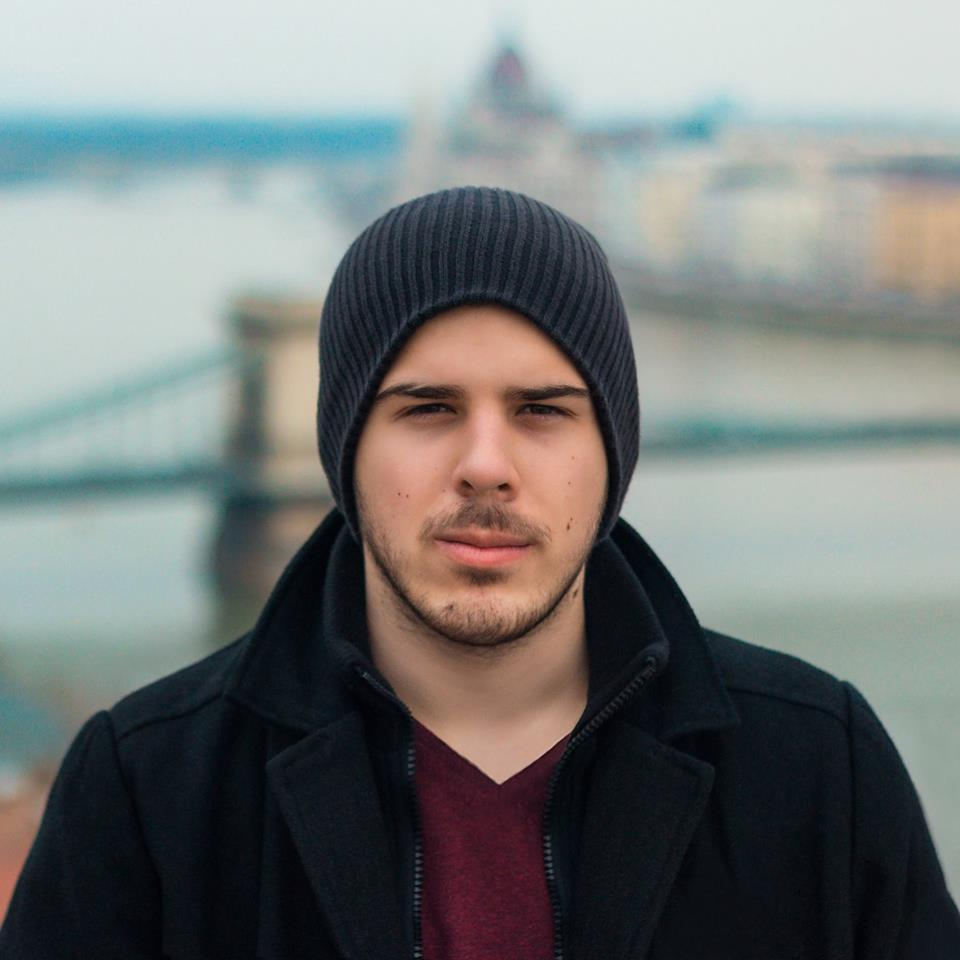
- Born: Srđan Vujmilović; May 14, 1994 (age 32); Banja Luka, Bosnia and Herzegovina
- Occupations: Artist; Photographer
- Years active: 2012–present
- Known for: Photography, Art
- Website: www.srdjanvujmilovic.com

Srđan Vujmilović (born 15 May 1994 in Banja Luka) is an artist and photographer who lives in Aleksandrovac, Republic of Srpska, Bosnia and Herzegovina. His subjects include nature, architecture, portrait, astrophotography and landscape. His media includes light painting, time-lapse photography, videography and graphic design. He has been taking photographs since 2012.

== Exhibitions ==
Vujmilović has had three solo exhibitions, including the second solo exhibition entitled Unique Vision with the theme of tolerance and the unity of man with nature, where he presented 64 photographs.

== Awards and mentions ==
He is the winner of the photography contest Rovinj PhotoDays 2017, where he won first place in the 'Landscape' category. His work has been published by Canon, medias such as Buka, eTrafika, www.banjaluka.com, www.banjalucanke.com, Mojabanjaluka.info, BB Portal, Banjaluka.net, Moja Banjaluka, Srpska Cafe, Karike, as well as Blic, Dani, and Nezavisne Novine national newspapers.

He was featured in television programs such as Morning Program on BN television, Morning Program RTRS television, and Serbian television show, Zikina Sarenica.

His works have also been published in magazines like Practical Photography Magazine and Photography Masterclass Magazine, as well as on portals such as Discovery Channel and National Geographic.
