= Srđan Pilipović =

Serbian archer (born 1973)

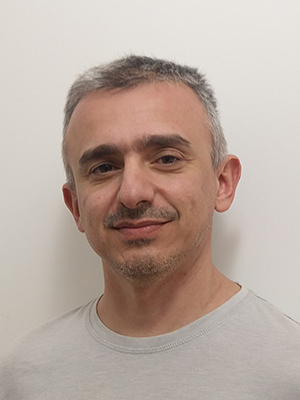

Personal information
- Nationality: Serbian
- Born: 3 October 1973 (age 52)
- Spouse: Dragana Sekulić Pilipović (m. 2004)

Sport
- Country: Serbia
- Sport: Archery
- Event: Barebow
- Club: SK Zemun
Medal record
Men's barebow archery
Representing Serbia
European Indoor Championships
Bronze medal – third place	2024 Varaždin	Team
Central European Cup
Silver medal – second place	2024 Central European Cup	Individual

Srđan Pilipović is a professional archer from Serbia.

Pilipović represented Serbia at the 2024 indoor European archery championships in Varaždin. The Serbian barebow team successfully achieved 3 place and won the first medal in the history of Serbian archery. He also Achieved 3rd place at the 3rd leg of the Central European Archery Cup that took place in Austria.
