= Srđan Cvijić =

Serbian political scientist

Academic background
- Education: Central European University; MA European University Institute PhD

Academic work
- Institutions: Open Society Foundations, Brussels
- Main interests: EU enlargement in the Western Balkans and Turkey

Srđan Cvijić is a Serbian political scientist who is a senior policy analyst on European Union external relations. Cvijić is the Senior Policy Analyst at the Open Society Foundations in Brussels and member of the Balkans in Europe Policy Advisory Group. He is an expert in the area of democratisation, public and international law and human rights law. Prior to working for the Open Society, Cvijić was employed at the European Policy Centre, the NATO Parliamentary Assembly, the Stability Pact for Southeastern Europe, and in the area of diplomacy for Serbia. He received his LLB from the University of Belgrade Faculty of Law, M.A. in International Relations and European Studies from Central European University and PhD from the Law Department of the European University Institute. He is a regular contributor to news sources, including Politico, EUobserver, the European Western Balkans as well as a commentator for Euronews, Radio Free Europe, Voice of America and others.
