= European Western Balkans =

Web portal

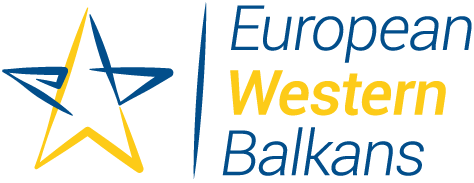
- Type: News website
- Owner: Centre for Contemporary Politics
- Founder(s): Nemanja Todorović Štiplija, Nikola S. Ristić, Artan Murati
- Editor-in-chief: Nemanja Todorović Štiplija
- Deputy editor: Nikola Burazer
- Founded: 21 May 2014; 11 years ago
- Language: English, Serbian, Albanian
- Headquarters: Belgrade, Serbia
- Country: Serbia
- Website: europeanwesternbalkans.com europeanwesternbalkans.rs
- Free online archives: Yes

European Western Balkans (sometimes abbreviated EWB) is a web portal that focuses on the Western Balkans countries and reports on development of the European Union's enlargement policy towards the states of North Macedonia, Montenegro, Serbia, Albania, Bosnia and Herzegovina and Kosovo.

The objective of European Western Balkans is to enhance understanding, raise awareness and further dialogue surrounding issues facing the democratization of Balkan nations and the desire for its integration in the European Union. The European Western Balkans website takes a more journalistic than scholarly approach with interviews and analysis from journalists, experts, analysts, writers, historians, as well as leaders and political figures from the European Union and Western Balkan states.

European Western Balkans is entirely independent and it is owned and run by the Centre for Contemporary Politics think tank based in Belgrade. In 2016 the portal, along with its parent organization and Konrad Adenauer Foundation, published a guide in Serbian "Evropski parlament i Srbija" (European Parliament and Serbia) with the aim of helping Serbian MP's understand how European Parliament works. The promotion of the guide took place in National Assembly of Serbia and the speakers were David McAlister and Maja Gojković.

== Content ==
Besides publishing regular news, EWB has a series of interviews with key people from Western Balkans countries which are involved in European integration process of their countries and interviews with politicians and specialists in a wide range of fields especially in European Politics and European integration.

In August 2020, EWB started recording weekly show called "EWB Screening" on their YouTube and Facebook account. The format of the show consists of one-on-one half an hour interviews with various experts on the topic of European integration related subjects primarily of Serbia, but also of the entire Western Balkans region.

== European Western Balkans Award ==
EWB gives out an annual award for contribution to European integration to persons and institutions who have contributed the most to the EU integration of the Western Balkans region. The first award was awarded in 2019 to Nikola Dimitrov, Minister of Foreign Affairs of North Macedonia.

List of laureates
Year	Recipient	Explanation of the Award
2019	Nikola Dimitrov	For demonstrating extraordinary efforts in bringing his country and the region closer to the EU, promoting the spirit of cooperation and peace in regional affairs, with a special emphasis on normalization of relations between Greece and North Macedonia, as well as an exemplary support for democratic reforms and overcoming the burden of the past in the Western Balkans.
2020	Tanja Fajon	For her unwavering commitment to the European future of the Western Balkans amidst rising challenges, continued representation of the value-based EU in the region, as well as the principled promotion of democracy, freedom and tolerance.
2021	Regional Cooperation Council	For its unwavering commitment to the European future of the region, continued strengthening of regional cooperation and connecting the region by facilitating the Roam-Free-Western-Balkans, as well as principled promotion and work on furthering economic cooperation in the Western Balkans.
2022	Terry Reintke	For unwavering support for freedoms of expression and assembly, contribution to improving the position of the LGBTI community in the region of Western Balkans, and engagement in raising awareness of the importance of respecting European values and principles of tolerance and equality.
2023	Laurence Boone & Anna Lührmann	For giving political momentum to the EU enlargement after a long period of stagnation and seizing the opportunity to promote the completion of the European Union, with Western Balkans as its integral part, as well as reforms bringing both the Union and the candidate countries closer to the democratic ideal.
2024	The 44th Government of Montenegro (Spajić Cabinet)	For seizing the political momentum of the EU enlargement process and achieving the closing of the first negotiation chapters after seven years. The Government’s dedication to the reform process, supported by Parliament, has enabled Montenegro to obtain the closing benchmarks in the Rule of Law, thereby enhancing its prospects for EU membership in the foreseeable future.
2025	Sandro Gozi	For his principled advocacy for the enlargement of the European Union to the Western Balkans, including in his role as European Parliament Rapporteur on the institutional consequences of enlargement, as well as for his efforts in promoting European values in the candidate countries of the region.

== European Western Balkans–Srbija ==
In April 2017, the portal European Western Balkans–Srbija started operating. The new web portal, in Serbian, is focused mainly on European integration of Serbia, following negotiations of chapters of Community acquis. In October 2025, the portal rebranded as Savremena politika (Contemporary Politics).

== Balkanoscope ==
On 26 March 2018 a new project called Balkanoscope was presented in Brussels. It is a joint initiative of EWB and European Fund for the Balkans. The aim of the project is to "present the Balkans from a different viewpoint...where real people are struggling with real issues" by publishing different stories and interviews.

As of 7 August 2018 there are English and French versions of the portal.
