= Srđan Gašić =

Serbian footballer

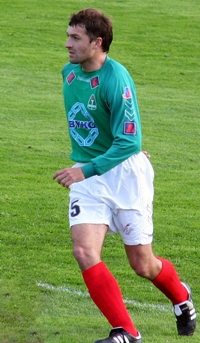

Personal information
- Date of birth: 23 November 1975 (age 50)
- Place of birth: Rijeka, SR Croatia, SFR Yugoslavia
- Height: 1.76 m (5 ft 9 in)
- Position: Defender

Senior career*
Years	Team	Apps	(Gls)
1993–1994	Goč	34	(6)
1994–1995	Sloga Kraljevo	32	(2)
1996–1998	Jedinstvo Paraćin	60	(4)
1998–1999	OFK Beograd	16	(0)
1999–2000	Jedinstvo Paraćin	32	(1)
2000–2003	Javor Ivanjica	80	(2)
2003–2004	Radnički Obrenovac	17	(1)
2004–2005	Vihren Sandanski	15	(0)
2005–2006	Metalac Gornji Milanovac	47	(2)
2006–2008	Breiðablik UBK	54	(0)
- * Club domestic league appearances and goals

Srđan Gašić (Serbian Cyrillic: Срђан Гашић; born 23 November 1975) is a retired Serbian football player.

== Club career ==
At the beginning of his career, he played for the club FK Goč of Vrnjačka Banja. He moved to FK Sloga Kraljevo as a 19-year-old player. He later played with FK Jedinstvo Paraćin, OFK Beograd, FK Javor Ivanjica, FK Radnički Obrenovac, FC Vihren Sandanski, FK Metalac Gornji Milanovac. In 2006, he signed with Breiðablik UBK from Iceland where he played three seasons. He played 393 games, and scored 18 goals in his career. He usually played as central defender.

After retiring he became youth coach of FC Volley from Vrnjačka Banja.
