= Srdjan Jovanovic Weiss =

Serbian architect

- Born: 1967; Subotica
- Died: March 3, 2022
- Occupation: Research Architect

Srdjan Jovanovic Weiss (Subotica 1967 - Novi Sad 2022) was a Harvard educated research architect from Serbia, artist and theorist living and working from New York and Berlin. He was an Ex-Head of Research of Herzog & de Meuron Architects, co-founder of School of Missing Studies for spatial research and founder of NAO.NYC for spatial design at all scales needed, based in New York.

Jovanovic Weiss was born in Subotica and lived in Novi Sad and Belgrade until 1995 completing his degree in architecture and engineering. His previous degree was at Advanced Mathematics at Gymnasium Jovanovic Jovanovic-Zmaj in Novi Sad in 1986. After Belgrade experience he moved to the United States for graduate studies at Harvard University on 1995. After two years at Harvard studying with Richard Gluckman, Jane Wernick, Jacques Herzog, Pierre de Meuron, Adriaan Geuze and Rem Koolhaas Jovanovic Weiss moved to New York where he started practicing architecture with Richard Gluckman and Robert Wilson. He opened an independent architectural practice called Normal Group for Architecture together with Swiss architect and writer Sabine von Fischer in New York City, and together they won the Second Prize in the 1998 2G Competition to expand Mies van der Rohe's Barcelona Pavilion. Von Fischer later founded Architecture Agency. Their collaboration lasted until 2003 when Jovanovic Weiss founded NAO.NYC (Normal Architecture Office), a collaborative studio for design of architecture, cities and exhibitions based in New York. He also co-founded SMS (School of Missing Studies), international art & architecture group for studying cities marked or undergoing abrupt transition.

His writing using epistemology as method started with articles for Akcelerator magazine, then as thesis for Harvard Project on the City. He became contributing editor of Cabinet Magazine - Quarterly of Art and Culture as of 2000 and its first issue. Finally he defended his long time research on Balkanization at Goldsmiths College Centre for Research Architecture.

Jovanovic Weiss's theoretical work is mostly known for analysis of Balkan cities in the aftermath of war and crisis in former Yugoslavia during 1990s. He coined the term Turbo Architecture and contributed to understanding the geo-political process termed Balkanization and its defining effects on newly emerging capital cities after the fall of Yugoslavia. Jovanovic Weiss defines Balkanization as a bottom-up geo-political process that new capital cities of new countries go through to assert their own urban distinction and character among competing new capital cities and against hegemonic forces of globalization.

Jovanovic Weiss authored books that include Socialist Architecture: The Reappearing Act (The Green Box, Berlin, 2017), Socialist Architecture: The Vanishing Act (JRP Ringier, 2012, with Armin Linke) and Almost Architecture (Merz & Akademie Solitude + kuda.nao, 2006).

By defining Turbo Architecture as a post-socialist mainstream in nationalizing collective identity through architecture, the author of the book Almost Architecture Srdjan Jovanovic Weiss is presenting his view on the complex relationships between politics, identity search, transition and war itself, all of that represented through specific historical and contemporary strategies in architecture. This book, in an interesting way, deals with depicting the major political shifts and turbulence periods in former Yugoslav and Serbian recent past through contexts of construction or deconstruction of symbolically charged buildings.

He edited the books: Evasions of Power: On the Architecture of Adjustment (Slought, Ed. 2008) and Lost Highway Expedition (School of Missing Studies, Ed. 2007). His work has been published in the books 100 Architects 10 Critics by Phaidon, Harvard Project on the city: Shopping, Did Someone Say Participate?, Networked Cultures: Parallel Architectures and the Politics of Space, Forensis: The Architecture of Public Truth, Atlas of Transformation, Beyond: Scenarios and Speculations, Concurrent Urbanism, Nationalities Papers, The Village and the Revolution, Across the Atlantic, Other Scale of Things and Inhabiting Geometry: Anne Tyng as well as magazines and journals such as Harvard Design Magazine, Cabinet Magazine, Perspecta, Akcelerator, Abitare, Domus, DaNS, Architectural Design, Oris, Thresholds et al.

He is currently running NAO.NYC - Normal Architecture Office.

Weiss curated and designed exhibitions in the United States of visionaries from the recent past: Lina Bo Bardi - 30 Years of MASP (at Columbia GSAPP), Yona Frieddman: About Cities (at The Drawing Center) and Anne Tyng: Inhabiting Geometry (at ICA Philadelphia and Graham Foundation, Chicago). His recent exhibition ~~California~~ Birobidzhan Dreamin' on Hannes Meyer and the city of Birobidzhan has been exhibited in Birobidzhan Philharmonic in Far East Russia. The exhibition: ArchiLeaks: In the Praise of Water Leaks, shown during October and November 2019 at the Museum of Contemporary Art in Skopje, Northern Macedonia marks Jovanovic Weiss' new and epistemological approach to mine data from errors in spatial knowledge and turn them into value.

Jovanovic Weiss previously collaborated with Richard Gluckman and Herzog & de Meuron Architects and artists Jenny Holzer, Anne Tyng, Yona Friedman, Eyal Weizman, Marjetica Potrč, Yevgheniy Fiks and Robert Wilson.

He was faculty at Harvard Graduate School of Design and CCNY Spitzer School of Architecture at CUNY. He taught at Columbia University GSAPP, Stuart Weitzman School of Design - University of Pennsylvania, Tyler School of Art Temple University and Cornell University AAP/NYC.

His art residences consist of being Fellow at Solitude Akademie, Stuttgart. Most recently Jovanovic Weiss is resident artist at PIK - Potsdam Institute for Climate Change Impacts via DAAD/Berlin with a project Better than Weather: In Praise of Human Search for Comfort. Jovanovic Weiss is fellow of Salzburg Global Seminar for 2021 in the section of American Studies.
