= European Fund for the Balkans =

- Европски фонд за Балкан
- 10th anniversary logo of the foundation
- Formation: 16 April 2008
- Founded at: Belgrade, Serbia
- Type: Foundation
- Legal status: Active
- Purpose: Justice, public administration reform, civil society, international cooperation, European integration;
- Headquarters: Majke Jevrosime 20, 11000 Belgrade, Serbia
- Location: Serbia
- Region served: Southeastern Europe
- Official language: English
- Executive Director: Aleksandra Tomanic
- Website: www.balkanfund.org

The European Fund for the Balkans (Serbian Cyrillic: Европски фонд за Балкан; abbreviation: EFB) is an organisation based in Belgrade. It was founded in 2008 as a joint initiative by the Robert Bosch Stiftung, the ERSTE Foundation, the King Baudouin Foundation and the Compagnia di San Paolo in order to support countries from the former Yugoslavia during their EU association process.

The EFB coordinated the Civil Society Forum within the framework of the Berlin Process. On its 10th anniversary of the foundation launched the Declaration of a European Balkans Partnership, a document signed by numerous Balkan actors which calls for more engagement by the EU in the former Yugoslavia to complete the region's socio-economic transformation. Declaration was authored by Balkans in Europe Policy Advisory Group (BiEPAG) who consulted Balkans state officials, representatives of European Union, representatives of civil society and renowned experts and intellectuals.

== Programmes ==
The European Fund for the Balkans (EFB) had two main programs aimed at developing human capital. One is the Fellowship Programme for Government Officials from the Western Balkans launched in 2008 which aims to educate civil servants about European political and social systems. The other is a series of Policy Hackathons, events aiming to create new solutions for issues faced by the citizens in the Balkans.

The Think and Link Regional Policy Programme was launched in 2008. Its aim is to support Balkan civil society organisations and independent institutes in the fields of public analysis, research and public policy proposals.

A project aimed at improving regional cooperation is the Balkans in Europe Policy Advisory Group (BiEPAG), which represents a group of experts engaged in researching political, economic and social trends in the Balkans. EFB established this group together with the Centre for Southeast European Studies at the University of Graz in 2013.

=== 10th anniversary ===
On 16 April 2018, its 10th anniversary, the foundation launched the Declaration of a European Balkans Partnership, a document signed by numerous Balkan actors that calls for more engagement by the EU in the Yugoslav successor states in order to complete the region's socio-economic transformation.

=== Balkanoscope ===
On 26 March 2018 a new project called "Balkanoscope" was presented in Brussels. It is a joint initiative of European Western Balkans and European Fund for the Balkans. Aim of the project is to "present the Balkans from a different viewpoint...where real people are struggling with real issues" by publishing different stories and interviews.

As of 7 August 2018 there are English and French version of the portal.
