= Balkans in Europe Policy Advisory Group =

Balkans in Europe Policy Advisory Group (BiEPAG)
- Logo of the group
- Formation: 2013 (8 years ago)
- Founder: European Fund for the Balkans; Centre for Southeast European Studies
- Type: Expert group
- Legal status: Active
- Purpose: Policy research, policy advocacy, policy debate, democratization and Europeanisation of the Western Balkans, European integration
- Region served: Southeastern Europe
- Members: 20 researchers (2018)
- Official language: English
- Coordinator: Florian Bieber
- Coordinator: Aleksandra Tomanic
- Coordinator: Milena Stefanovic
- Coordinator: Marko Kmezic
- Website: www.biepag.eu

The Balkans in Europe Policy Advisory Group (abbreviation: BiEPAG) is an expert group founded in 2013 by European Fund for the Balkans and Centre for Southeast European Studies of the University of Graz. It is composed of the policy analysts, scholars, researchers from the Balkans and wider Europe who are researching political, economic and social trends in the Balkans. The goal of the Group is to support European integration of the region, and to contribute to the consolidation of the vibrant democracies, through the facilitation of evidence based policy dialogue.

== Notable members ==
- Florian Bieber
- Srđan Cvijić
- Srđan Majstorović
- Donika Emini
- Dejan Jović
- Nikola Dimitrov (former member)
