= Finest Hour: The Best of Gavin DeGraw =

Compilation album by Gavin DeGraw
- Released: October 21, 2014
- Genres: Pop rock; blue-eyed soul
- Label: RCA
- Producers: Jerrod "Skins" Bettis; Johan Carlsson; Peter Carlsson; Mark Endert; Martin Johnson; Oliver Leiber; Max Martin; Kyle Moorman; Brandon Paddock; Ryan Tedder; Butch Walker; Noel Zancanella

Gavin DeGraw chronology
| Make a Move (2013) | Finest Hour: The Best of Gavin DeGraw (2014) | Something Worth Saving (2016) |

Singles from Finest Hour: The Best of Gavin DeGraw
- 1. "You Got Me" Released: July 28, 2014; 2. "Fire" Released: August 12, 2014

Finest Hour: The Best of Gavin DeGraw is a compilation album by American singer-songwriter Gavin DeGraw, released on October 21, 2014, by RCA Records. It contains songs from all his studio albums except Free (2009). It also includes the two new tracks "You Got Me" and "Fire". According to the press release, a new song titled "Not Our Fault", written by DeGraw, Jake Gosling, Chris Leonard, and Harry Styles, was intended to be included on the album but did not make the final track listing.

== Track listing ==
| No. | Title | Writer(s) | Producer(s) | Length |
|---|---|---|---|---|
| 1. | "I Don't Want to Be" | DeGraw | Mark Endert | 3:38 |
| 2. | "Not Over You" | DeGraw, Ryan Tedder | Tedder, Noel Zancanella, Jerrod "Skins" Bettis | 3:38 |
| 3. | "Follow Through" | DeGraw | Endert | 3:59 |
| 4. | "In Love with a Girl" (Max Martin unreleased version) | DeGraw | Martin | 3:19 |
| 5. | "Chariot" | DeGraw | Endert | 3:59 |
| 6. | "We Belong Together" | DeGraw | Oliver Leiber | 4:30 |
| 7. | "Best I Ever Had" | DeGraw, Martin Johnson | Johnson, Kyle Moorman^{[a]}, Brandon Paddock^{[a]} | 3:46 |
| 8. | "Finest Hour" | DeGraw, Tedder | Tedder, Zancanella | 3:41 |
| 9. | "Soldier" | DeGraw | Butch Walker | 3:31 |
| 10. | "Fire" | DeGraw, Johan Carlsson, Ross Golan | Martin, J. Carlsson, Peter Carlsson^{[b]} | 3:48 |
| 11. | "You Got Me" | Diane Warren | Johnson, Moorman^{[a]}, Paddock^{[a]} | 3:47 |

Notes

- ^{^[a]} signifies an additional producer
- ^{^[b]} signifies a vocal producer

== Personnel ==
- Smith Carlson – engineering

== Charts ==
Chart performance
| Chart (2014) | Peak position |
|---|---|
| US Billboard 200 | 95 |
