= Something Worth Saving =

Studio album by Gavin DeGraw
- Released: September 9, 2016
- Genre: Pop
- Length: 36:23
- Label: RCA
- Producer: Dave Bassett; Johan Carlsson; John Shanks; Butch Walker; Gregg Wattenberg; Ricky Reed

Gavin DeGraw chronology
Finest Hour: The Best of Gavin DeGraw (2014)	Something Worth Saving (2016)	Face the River (2022)

Singles from Something Worth Saving
- 1. "She Sets the City on Fire" Released: July 15, 2016; 2. "Making Love with the Radio On" Released: August 12, 2016

Something Worth Saving is the sixth studio album by American singer-songwriter Gavin DeGraw. It was released on September 9, 2016, by RCA Records. This album centers around uplifting messages and happiness. It's the next phase in his life, and he's all about "focusing on the good things." Something Worth Saving is the second album DeGraw has produced with other songwriters rather than writing the entire album himself. This album features work from Todd Clark, Jason Saenz, Gregg Wattenberg, Eric Frederic, Dave Bassett, Johan Carisson, John Shanks, and Gavin DeGraw.

Something Worth Saving explores many genres and sounds of music. DeGraw explores pop, soul, instrumental, funk, and '60s music, making this album different than the ones of his past.

== Background and inspiration ==
On July 15, 2016, DeGraw announced that Something Worth Saving was on its way and on September 9 of the same year, he delivered. Gavin grew up in New York and produced his first album in 2003, named Chariot, and besides his new release, has recorded three other studio albums along with a greatest hits collection all while becoming a famed name. Like some of his previous music, this new album has a happy, cheery sound with many different moods represented that act as a seasonal wrap-up to the summer of 2016.

DeGraw began working on Something Worth Saving right after his album release Make a Move in October 2013. In 2014, he released two new singles ("You Got Me" and "Fire") followed by a greatest hits album that fall. Aside from touring, DeGraw was pretty much out of the public eye in 2015, leaving many to wonder if this was the time when he did most of the writing for his new album.

Per a USA Today interview about the 2016 album release, DeGraw said he looks to music icons including The Beatles, David Bowie and Prince while writing. "I lean toward classic stuff for inspiration, and those influences really haven't changed. The ones that have stood the test of time ultimately have the ingredients that belong in every songwriting kitchen."

Lyrically, Something Worth Saving seems to be inspired by a girl (evidenced by songs like "Kite Like Girl", "You Make My Heart Sing Louder", and "Making Love with the Radio On"). When an interviewer from BUILD Series in New York asked Gavin how life was going after jokingly listing track names from the album, DeGraw answered "I know some people, they like to make music that is strictly sexy. Some people like to make stuff that sounds a little bit more aggressive. I like pretty music, and I like music that makes people feel uplifted and empowered. I think that the people need to feel empowered and (love) makes people feel empowered. So for the most part, that's the type of thing I enjoy writing about. I enjoy writing about something that makes people feel like things are going their way rather than being in their way." Understandably, DeGraw is known for being tight-lipped about his relationships or his social life in public. You don't hear him speak about much other than his music. So even if there was a girl who inspired this album, it would be difficult to know. There is a track on the album called "Annalee" about a mystery girl whose "eyes are bright as chandeliers" and "got them falling from the roof hypnotized and paralyzed" but there has been no answer as to who Annalee is. Of all the rumors about DeGraw's romantic life, none have been confirmed by him over the years.

In an audio clip on MTV, DeGraw speaks about the friction that occurs when you write your own music as an artist. "I think something interesting happens when you're a songwriter and when you're an artist as a songwriter. It's that sometimes when you're writing, you may just want to write something fictional just because you think it's cool and you like the way it sounds. So, in some ways (as an artist), sometimes you feel like you are inhibiting yourself, (by) not exploring something super fictional just because it's cool. You may go 'oh, well as an artist you're going to be held somehow accountable for whatever these words are, whatever perspective this is, whatever this sound is.' Whereas, all you're thinking about as a writer is that you want to try something cool out."

Aside from DeGraw's own personal inspiration, which seems only to be experimenting with new sounds and bringing positive music to the world, there were many co-writers for Something Worth Saving. Only two of the ten tracks on the album are solely attributed to DeGraw, and he speaks often about collaborating with the other writers and producers in the video of the BUILD series interview. In the same video, when asked which track is his baby, he says he can't pick a favorite but the one he probably worked the hardest on to get it just right was "You Make My Heart Sing Louder" with Ricky Reed. He also notes that in the studio, Ricky and Gavin originally nicknamed the track "My Well and Wall". It's his mother's favorite track from the album.

== Promotion ==
The first single for Something Worth Saving was "She Sets the City on Fire", released on July 15, 2016, which received a corresponding music video on August 31, 2016, nine days before the album itself was released. It launched on DeGraw's official VEVO YouTube channel, prefaced by a lyric video that came out a month prior. The music video, directed by Daniel Cz, stars DeGraw and supermodel Jessica Vargas.

== Critical reception ==
Something Worth Saving has been called more "upbeat and bubbly" than DeGraw's past work. DeGraw told USA Today that he wanted to make something "very modern" where he explored many different genres that haven't been featured on past albums.

== Tour ==
In May 2016, Gavin DeGraw announced his upcoming North American tour where he would be performing with Andy Grammer through early November 2016. The tour kicked off near Gavin DeGraw's hometown in Bethel, New York, on August 28, 2016 and ended on November 9, 2016 in Boca Raton, Florida. Tickets went on sale May 20, 2016 and pre-sale tickets went on sale May 17 at 10 am local time. The show scheduled for November 7, 2016 was later canceled due to illness. Throughout this tour Gavin DeGraw shared samples of music he had been working on and would later include on Something Worth Saving.

== Track listing ==
Something Worth Saving – Standard edition
No.	Title	Writer(s)	Producer(s)	Length
1.	"She Sets the City on Fire"	Gavin DeGraw; Gregg Wattenberg; Todd Clark; Jason Saenz	Wattenberg	3:38
2.	"You Make My Heart Sing Louder"	DeGraw; Eric Frederic	Ricky Reed	3:54
3.	"Kite Like Girl"	DeGraw; Dave Bassett	Bassett	3:20
4.	"Making Love with the Radio On"	DeGraw	Butch Walker	4:09
5.	"Harder to Believe"	DeGraw; Johan Carlsson	Carlsson	4:04
6.	"Say I Am"	DeGraw; John Shanks	Shanks	3:15
7.	"How Lucky Can a Man Get"	DeGraw; Shanks	Shanks	3:53
8.	"New Love"	DeGraw; Carlsson	Carlsson	3:26
9.	"Annalee"	DeGraw; Bassett	Bassett	3:06
10.	"Something Worth Saving"	DeGraw	Walker	3:38

Something Worth Saving – Target deluxe edition (bonus tracks)
No.	Title	Writer(s)	Producer(s)	Length
11.	"Thank You"		Ian Kirkpatrick	3:41
12.	"Technicolor"	Kirkpatrick; Sean Douglas		3:14

== Charts ==
Chart (2016)	Peak position
Belgian Albums (Ultratop Flanders)	70
Belgian Albums (Ultratop Wallonia)	168
Canadian Albums (Billboard)	100
Dutch Albums (Album Top 100)	51
Scottish Albums (OCC)	85
Swedish Albums (Sverigetopplistan)	52
Swiss Albums (Schweizer Hitparade)	72
US Billboard 200	35
