= Genevieve Morton =

South African model (born 1986)

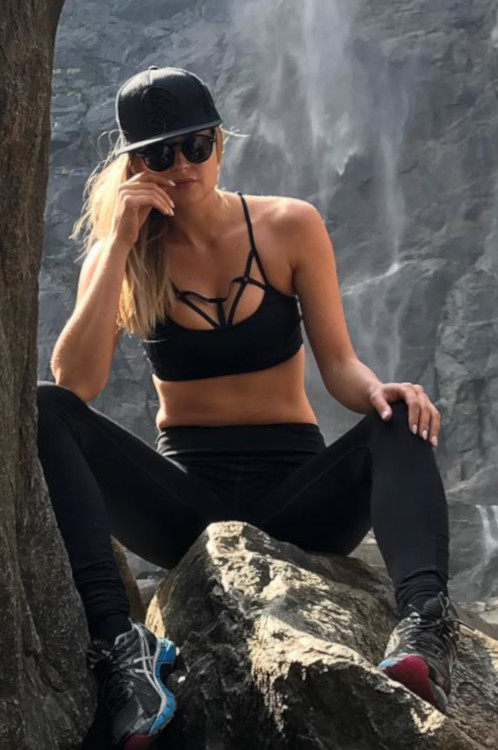
- Genevieve Morton resting during Mountain Hiking
- Born: Genevieve Debra Morton; 9 July 1986 (age 40); Benoni, South Africa
- Citizenship: South African; United States
- Years active: 2008-present
- Modeling information
- Height: 1.74 m (5 ft 8 1/2 in)
- Hair color: Blonde
- Eye color: Blue
- Agency: IMG Models (New York, Los Angeles)
- Website: genevievemorton.com

Genevieve Morton (born 9 July 1986 in Benoni) is a South African and American model. Morton was voted the Sexiest Woman in the World in 2012 by FHM and was named one of the Top 50 Swimsuit Models of All Time by Sports Illustrated in 2014.

== Early life ==
Morton was born in Benoni, in the South African province of Gauteng. At the age of twelve, she moved to Scottburgh, where she spent the rest of her childhood.

== Career ==
Morton was photographed for the Sports Illustrated for the first time in 2010 by photographer Walter Chin.

She shot with the South African team four more times (2009, 2011, 2013, 2014). She appeared on the cover of the 2011 issue, shot by Jacques Weyers. Morton was also featured on the cover in 2013 for the inaugural issue of World Swimsuit South Africa.

In 2010, she made her debut in the Sports Illustrated Swimsuit Issue, going on to appear in the 2011 (Fiji), 2012 (Zambia), 2013 (Hayman Islands), 2014 (Switzerland), and 2015 (Virgin Islands) issues.

Morton appeared on Esquire Online: Me in My Place in 2011.

She appeared with the American comedy troupe The Lonely Island in the December 2011 issue of GQ. Morton was also selected to be on the cover of the South African GQ Soccer World Cup issue. Morton also appeared on the cover of the July 2014 issue of GQ South Africa.

In 2012, she appeared in the music video for the song "Sweeter" by Gavin DeGraw.

== Personal life ==
Morton announced that she became an American citizen.
