= Best I Ever Had (disambiguation) =

"Best I Ever Had" is a song by Canadian rapper Drake.

Other songs with the same title include:

- "Best I Ever Had" (Gavin DeGraw song)
- "Best I Ever Had (Grey Sky Morning)", originally recorded by Vertical Horizon and covered by Gary Allan under the title "Best I Ever Had"
- "Best I Ever Had", a song by State of Shock from their 2007 album Life, Love & Lies
- "Best I Ever Had", a 2021 song by Nasty C
