= Sweeter (album) =

Studio album by Gavin DeGraw
- Released: September 20, 2011
- Recorded: 2011
- Studio: Blackbird Studio in Nashville; Henson Recording Studios in Hollywood
- Genre: Pop rock; blue-eyed soul
- Length: 38:49
- Label: RCA
- Producer: Ron Aniello; Jerrod Bettis; Ryan Tedder; Andrew Frampton; Eric Rosse; Butch Walker; Noel Zancanella

Gavin DeGraw chronology
Free (2009)	Sweeter (2011)	Make a Move (2013)

Singles from Sweeter
- 1. "Not Over You" Released: May 17, 2011; 2. "Sweeter" Released: March 12, 2012; 3. "Soldier" Released: September 20, 2012

Sweeter is the fourth studio album by American singer-songwriter Gavin DeGraw. The album was released in the United States on September 20, 2011, and features tracks co-written with other artists for the very first time, including Ryan Tedder, Butch Walker, and Andrew Frampton. The lead single, "Not Over You", co-written and produced by Ryan Tedder, was released to mainstream radio and to iTunes in May and was a chart success. The album received generally favorable reviews from music critics and received a moderate impact on the charts. This is his first album with RCA Records.

== Background ==
"I worked with four different producers, so different producers recorded different songs with me and you’re getting a lot of variety on there."

— Gavin DeGraw telling to The Examiner about the variety of songs on his new album.

DeGraw defined the album as "more refined yet edgier sound". He revealed to The Examiner that "For this album in particular what happened was there were things that I did musically that I recorded that I hadn’t recorded before. Continuing he explained, "Some of the types of singing that I’m doing on this album, I’ve done it live but I’ve never actually recorded it this way." DeGraw also described the album as "just funkier and more sexy than the albums I’ve made in the past. Not that every song is about bumping and grinding cause that’s not at all the record I’m saying I made. It’s just a sexier more intimate type of album."

== Composition ==
"Not Over You", which poignantly evokes the difficulty of getting over someone, is one of two songs DeGraw co-wrote with Ryan Tedder for Sweeter, which was recorded in several locations, including Ryan's studio in Denver, Blackbird Studio in Nashville, producer Butch Walker's space in Venice, CA, and the legendary Henson Recording Studios in Hollywood. The album finds DeGraw experimenting with new sounds, which resulted in a potent, swaggering strut, both musically and lyrically, on sexually charged songs like the R&B-infused "Sweeter" and "Radiation." The racier moments are balanced out by more emotionally transparent songs like the vigorous "Not Over You", and the uplifting "Soldier" and "You Know Where I'm At," which convey vulnerability while still managing to feel distinctly masculine. He decided to work with co-writers for the first time as a way to broaden his horizons, such as Ryan Tedder, who also co-wrote and produced "Sweeter", and Andrew Frampton. He also worked with a host of producers including Butch Walker, Eric Rosse, and Ron Aniello.

"Co-writing with other people changed everything for me," DeGraw said. "Not only did it open my mind to new ideas, but it changed the way I wrote on my own. Playing all these different styles with other musicians led me to think about things differently when I was working by myself. I was able to tap into things I do live, dabbling with some of that late 1960s, early 1970s R&B stuff; I was able to record all the styles of music that I like and put them on one album. It was great to take my leash off and experiment. Although it doesn't stray too far from what I've done, I think it's the first album I've made that has caught my true sound."

In an interview with Amanda Hensel from PopCrush, DeGraw explained the recording sessions with Tedder:

That day we wrote the song 'Sweeter,' which became the title track to the record. We were really excited about it, we felt it has something very gritty about it, but at the same time very soulful. There's an element of the Black Keys to it, there's an element of Sly and the Family Stone to it and it still had that anesthetic hook, which we were stoked about. [...] "The first day, we were just sitting around the piano, and he was like, 'Hey man, what do you think of this little piano riff?' You know? [mimics the intro to 'Not Over You'] I was like, 'Oh, it sucks.' I'm kidding. I was like, 'Wow, man! That's great, it's got a great hook. It's already catchy. I don't know what it is but I want to keep listening to figure it out.' We were excited about, and we thought right away that it sounded like a first single. It brings new elements to the table and at the same time is reminiscent of the first record, the Chariot record. There's sort of a discovery period element to that song that really felt, you know, like you're finding your way with music. That's a special type of feeling to have when you're turning a song, to make it a song that doesn't sound like you planned on writing it, a song that sort of sounds like an accident. That's what I really like about it.

=== Songs ===
The lead single "Not Over You", is the result of his collaboration with Ryan Tedder. "I really felt strongly that it was a nice blend of what both of us kind of do musically," DeGraw said. Tedder also contributed to the title track, "Sweeter", which has a pop-funk kind of vibe. In "Run Every Time", he sings about being unable to commit with someone who's ready to take it to the next level in their situation. The devoted love anthem "Soldier", was described by DeGraw as a "really beautiful sentiment." "Radiation" is about making a late night call to the one person you probably shouldn't be calling, but dial anyway when the mood strikes. DeGraw told that songs like "Radiation" and the title track "embrace some of what would either be considered primal or imperfect," and that "for a moment, it's not bad to feature reality versus romance on a record."

== Critical reception ==
Professional ratings
Aggregate scores
Source	Rating
Metacritic	64/100
Review scores
Source	Rating
AllMusic	3.5/5 stars
The Boston Globe	(mixed)
Entertainment Weekly	B−
musicOMH	2/5 stars
Rolling Stone	3/5 stars
Seattle Post-Intelligencer	(positive)
Sputnikmusic	1.5/5
USA Today	2.5/4 stars
Us Weekly	3/5 stars

The album so far has a score of 64 out of 100 from Metacritic based on four "generally favorable reviews". Stephen Thomas Erlewine of AllMusic rated it 3.5 out of 5 stars and wrote that "Sweeter benefits from greater textures in his surroundings, stronger hooks in the melodies, and, for once, a sensibility that doesn’t sacrifice the present for the sake of paying respect to the past." Jody Rosen from Rolling Stone gave the album a positive review, stating that: "The 10 songs on Sweeter, DeGraw's fourth album, are taut, efficient and hook-packed, with guitars bolstering the big choruses. DeGraw is an excellent singer, with a hint of grit in his tenor that tips power ballads like "Soldier" toward soul music." Melissa Maerz wrote a positive review for Entertainment Weekly, saying that "there's a half-dozen good ones on his fourth full-length Sweeter (check the title track). Too bad the other half's weighed down by painfully mopey, girl-done-left-me blues." Ken Capobianco wrote a more mixed review for The Boston Globe, stating, "The results are predictably formulaic, as seen on their co-writing effort, 'Not Over You'." Ian Drew of Us Weekly wrote favorably that "Though these 10 short tracks tend to sound a bit same-y, it's hard not to get into hearing the singer's warm, gruff voice back at work, especially on the lively title track." musicOMH's Andy Baber wrote that "Sweeter is often an enjoyable listen, one that will appease his One Tree Hill fanbase. However, with four albums now to his name, DeGraw should be looking to broaden his musical style and take some more risks. Barring a couple of exceptions, Sweeter is on the whole a timid affair, one that is all too forgettable." On the other hand, Irving Tan of Sputnikmusic criticized the album, giving it a score of one-and-a-half out of five and saying that it "ends up passing by in a haze of indifference because, even though it has all the gilded sheen of a pop product engineered and marketed to perfection, at its core it is trite, grossly unmemorable, and unmistakably insincere – even by vanilla pop’s relatively shallow standards."

== Chart performance ==
The album debuted on the Billboard 200 at number eight, selling 34,000 copies in its first week. It is DeGraw's second top-ten album, his first being his self-titled album (2008), which debuted at number seven, with 66,000 copies sold in its first week. However, it only spent one week in the top 50 as it dropped forty-five places to #53 in its second week and #90 in its third week, whereas his self-titled album spent three weeks in the top fifty and dropped only eight places in its second week.

== Singles ==
The lead single "Not Over You" was released on May 17, 2011, and has reached a lot of success, peaking at number eighteen on the Billboard Hot 100 chart, while reaching top-ten on the Pop Songs and topping the Adult Pop Songs chart. In Canada, the song peaked at number twenty-eight, while in Australia, the song reached the top-forty and in New Zealand, it peaked at number eight. "Soldier" was released in Canada as the second single. It has charted on the Netherlands chart and peaked at number thirty-three. Later, "Sweeter" was released in October again in Netherlands, where it charted at number seventy-six. The song was released as the second single of the album in the United States in March. The music video premiered on March 15, 2012, on E! News at 7 pm PT/ET and later on E! Online at 5 pm PT/8 pm ET. Officially, the song debuted at number forty on the Billboard Adult Pop Songs chart. "Soldier" was chosen as the third and final single for the album and was released on September 20, 2012.

== Track listing ==
All lyrics are written by Gavin DeGraw; all music is composed by Gavin DeGraw except where noted.

Sweeter track listing
No.	Title	Writer(s)	Producer(s)	Length
1.	"Sweeter"	DeGraw; Ryan Tedder	Tedder	3:43
2.	"Not Over You"	DeGraw; Tedder	Tedder; Noel Zancanella; Jerrod "Skins" Bettis	3:38
3.	"Run Every Time"	DeGraw; Andrew Frampton	Eric Ivan Rosse	3:06
4.	"Soldier"		Butch Walker	3:31
5.	"Candy"		Walker	4:38
6.	"You Know Where I'm At"		Ron Aniello	3:21
7.	"Stealing"		Aniello	4:17
8.	"Radiation"		Walker	4:17
9.	"Where You Are"		Rosse	4:21
10.	"Spell It Out"	DeGraw; Frampton	Frampton	3:57

== Charts ==
=== Weekly charts ===
Weekly chart performance for Sweeter
Chart (2011)	Peak position
Australian Albums (ARIA)	65
Belgian Albums (Ultratop Flanders)	61
Canadian Albums (Nielsen SoundScan)	41
Danish Albums (Hitlisten)	6
Dutch Albums (Album Top 100)	6
Norwegian Albums (VG-lista)	25
Swedish Albums (Sverigetopplistan)	29
Swiss Albums (Schweizer Hitparade)	19
US Billboard 200	8

=== Year-end charts ===
Year-end chart performance for Sweeter
Chart (2012)	Position
Dutch Albums (Album Top 100)	87

== Certifications ==
Certifications for Sweeter
Region	Certification	Certified units/sales
United States (RIAA)	Gold	500,000^{‡}
^{‡} Sales+streaming figures based on certification alone.
