= The National Underground =

New York City music venue

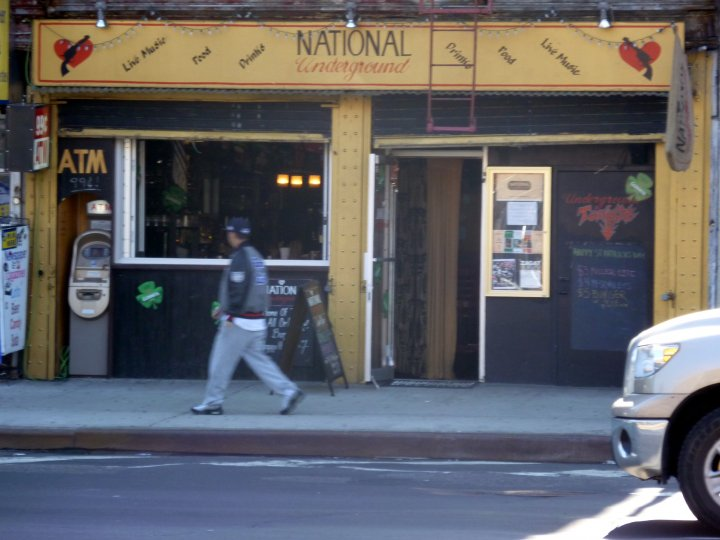
- The National Underground NYC in March 2010
- Interactive map of The National Underground
- Type: casual dining, restaurants, live shows

Construction
- Closed: Permanently closed

The National Underground was a music venue in New York City, that was launched in December 2007. It was a roots rock Americana music bar founded in Manhattan's Lower East Side, at 159 East Houston Street between Allen and Eldridge Streets. In 2011, a further venue opened at 105 Broadway, Nashville, TN 37201 (expanding and changing its name to “Nashville Underground” in 2018), which remains open as of December 2024, even as the original NYC location has permanently closed.

The venue was co-owned by brothers Joey DeGraw and Gavin DeGraw, and offered music, food, and drink. Joey DeGraw is an independent artist whose first record sold 40,000 copies without any label support. Gavin DeGraw is a multi-platinum J Records recording artist. The former New York space once was home to Martignetti Liquors, and had been decorated with hanging tapestries and a pair of Texas longhorns above the bar.

The idea for the venue came about because the brothers wanted a place where they could hang out on a regular basis, and where other musicians could come in. "We were picky about the quality of musicians that played there," Gavin DeGraw says. "We wanted a place where the players were so good, other musicians were like, 'Wow! I really respect what they're doing.'"

Musicians that have played at The National Underground include Gavin DeGraw, Joss Stone, Chris Barron, and The Shells. Irish musician Rob Smith played his first ever US show at the venue in 2010. Musician PARIS RAY played a weekly gig every Sunday in 2012.

== See also ==
https://www.nashunderground.com/
