= Sweeter (Gavin DeGraw song) =

Single by Gavin DeGraw

from the album Sweeter
- Released: October 31, 2011 (Promotional single); March 12, 2012 (Official single)
- Recorded: 2011
- Genre: Pop-funk
- Length: 3:43
- Label: RCA
- Songwriters: Gavin DeGraw, Ryan Tedder
- Producer: Ryan Tedder

Gavin DeGraw singles chronology
"Not Over You" (2011)	"Sweeter" (2011)	"Soldier" (2012)

"Sweeter" is a song by American recording artist Gavin DeGraw, released as the second single of his fourth studio album of the same name. The song was written by DeGraw and Ryan Tedder, and produced by Tedder. The song finds DeGraw fantasizing about another guy's girl and received positive reviews from most music critics. The song has charted on the Dutch chart. The song will be released as the second single of the album in the United States in late March 2012. A music video was filmed in February and premiered on March 15, 2012, on E! News.

== Background and composition ==
"There is always that risk and trying to get that correct is a fine line. Some people will hate you for sounding vulnerable at all, so you can't win 'em all, right? You have to accept that stuff... The things that make writing challenging are things that make it the most enjoyable."

— Gavin DeGraw talking to Billboard about the song.

The song finds DeGraw fantasizing about another guy's girl. He told Billboard magazine many of the songs on the album "ride the vulnerability spot." Amy Sciarretto wrote for "Artist Direct" that while experimenting with new sounds, it resulted in a "potent, swaggering strut, both musically and lyrically, on sexually charged songs like the R&B-infused "Sweeter"." On the chorus, he sings "I just want to take someone else’s holiday/Sometimes the grass is greener/And someone else’s sugar, someone else’s sugar’s sweeter".

In an interview with Amanda Hensel from "Pop Crush", DeGraw explained the recording sessions with Tedder:

"That day we wrote the song ‘Sweeter,’ which became the title track to the record. We were really excited about it, we felt it has something very gritty about it, but at the same time very soulful. There’s an element of the Black Keys to it, there’s an element of Sly and the Family Stone to it and it still had that anesthetic hook, which we were stoked about."

== Critical reception ==
Stephen Thomas Erlewine from Allmusic picked the song as one of the best tracks, alongside Not Over You and "You Know Where I'm At". Entertainment Weekly's Melissa Maerz also picked it as one of the album's highlights, calling it a "white-boy gospel track." Andy Baber from musicOMH wrote a positive review for the song, saying that "the album starts promisingly, opening with the pop-funk title track, Sweeter. The chugging guitar and piano combination provides the track with real drive, and when you add DeGraw’s strong and soulful vocals on top, it all makes for a purposeful opening." Kristen Coachman wrote for Seattle Pi that "The guitar in the beginning gets in your head to the point that you cannot help, but groove along to it throughout the song. There's a confident, yet sexy swagger to the track, as DeGraw sings about wanting to get with another guy's girl."

== Music video ==
A still from the video, where DeGraw is on the bed with Genevieve Morton.

A music video for the song was shot in February. It was shot at 4 am and. On set, Gavin told VH1 News that the video is about a girl being "Under-appreciated by her man. She decides she’s going to get out of the place and grab me on her way out.” With a cheeky grin on his face, he adds, “And I’m a guy, so I’m going to go along with this!". The video premiered on March 15, 2012, on E! News at 7 pm PT/ET and later on E! Online at 5 pm PT/8pm ET. It began airing on his VEVO account on March 16.

The video directed by Lenny Bass and shot in Brooklyn and features Sports Illustrated model Genevieve Morton. The video begins in a bar setting where DeGraw woos Morton away from a less than enthusiastic boyfriend and they take off on an afternoon adventure together.

== Chart performance ==
The song debuted at number ninety on the Netherlands Singles chart on the week of October 22, 2011. In its second week, it reached its peak position of number seventy-six. It stayed for five weeks, descending the charts, until it dropped out. Altogether, the song stayed for seven weeks on the charts.

Even though is not officially released, the song is being played on many American radio stations and is charting on the Hot Adult Pop Songs chart on the All Access's Mediabase chart and is currently at number forty-five. Officially, the song debuted at number forty on the Billboard Adult Pop Songs chart. It later, climbed to number thirty-seven. In the third week, the song climbed to number thirty-two. In the fourth week, the song rose to number 28 and it has reached number 18, so far.

== Live performances ==
Gavin performed the song for the first time on The Tonight Show with Jay Leno on March 18, 2012. On May 1, 2012, Gavin performed the song on Dancing with the Stars, where DeGraw was a contestant on the season, but was eliminated. The camera switched back and forth, focusing on DeGraw as he sang while his former partner Karina Smirnoff danced with Louis Van Amstel. Gavin performed the song on Jimmy Kimmel Live! on May 21, 2012.

== Charts ==
Chart (2011–12)	Peak position
Netherlands (Single Top 100)	76
US Bubbling Under Hot 100 (Billboard)	16
US Adult Pop Airplay (Billboard)	18
