= Joey DeGraw =

American singer-songwriter

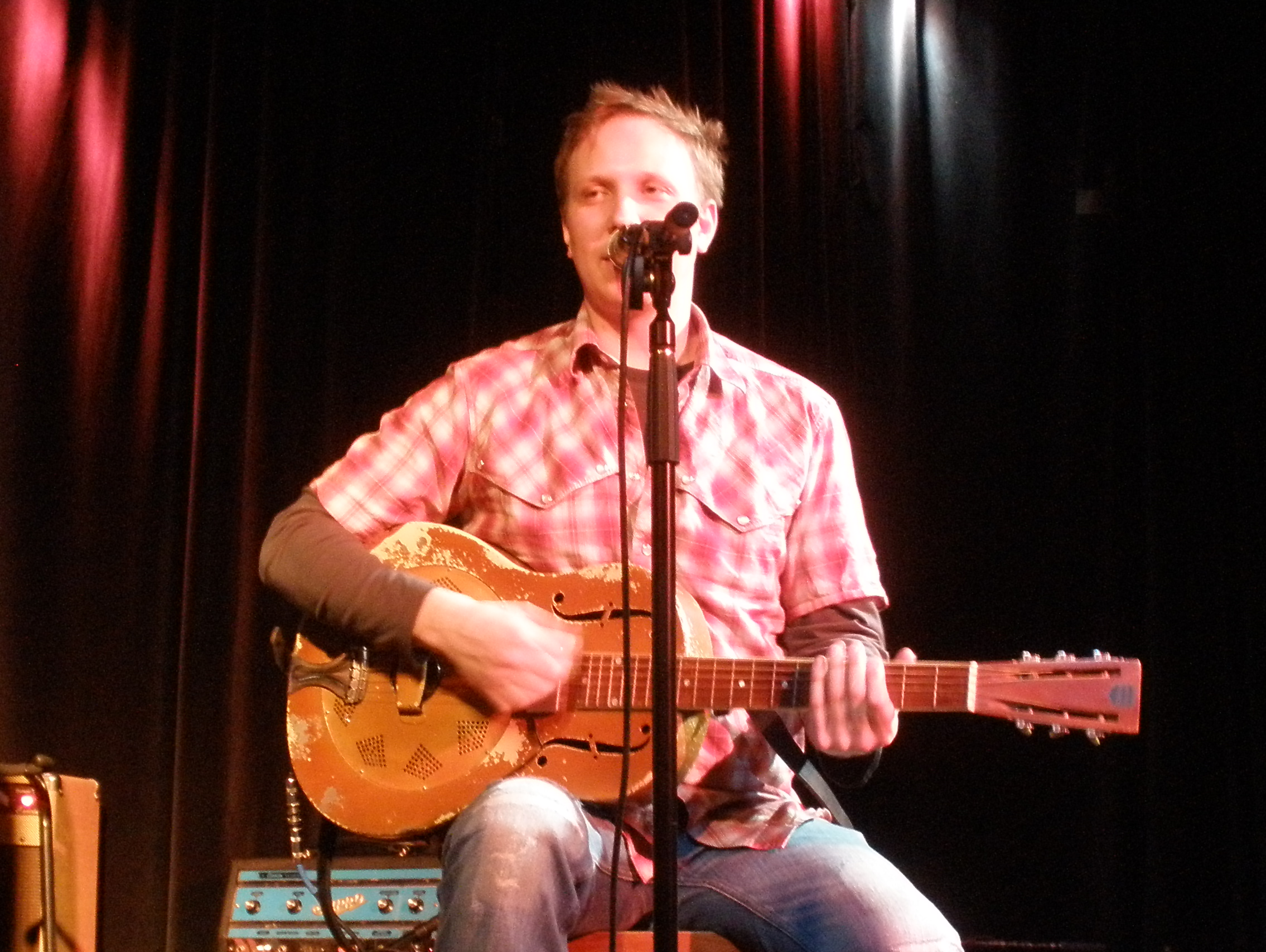

Background information
- Born: August 21, 1973 (age 53)
- Origin: South Fallsburg, New York, United States
- Genre: Indie rock
- Occupations: Singer-songwriter, musician
- Instruments: Vocals, guitar
- Label: The National Underground Records
- Formerly of: Gavin DeGraw Band
- Website: Official website

Joseph Wayne DeGraw (born August 21, 1973) is an American singer-songwriter, musician, voiceover actor & co-owner of The National Underground bar and record label, and brother of singer-songwriter Gavin DeGraw. His first commercial release was the 2009 album, Say Something Strong.

== Early life ==
The middle child of Wayne and Lynne DeGraw, he grew up in the Catskills, in South Fallsburg, New York, along with his sister, Neeka and brother, Gavin, who is also a singer-songwriter. His father was a prison guard and his mother was a detox specialist, as mentioned in his brother's song "I Don't Want to Be". His father is of Irish descent and his mother's family was of Russian-Jewish ancestry. He started playing the guitar at the age of five and piano at the age of eight. Inspired by the likes of Chris Whitley, Queen, Tom Petty and The Beatles, DeGraw continued his passion for music throughout his schooling, having written over 50 songs by the age of 18. After leaving high school, he decided not to study "institutionalized creativity" stating that "music school can't teach you how to write great songs."

== Career ==
DeGraw moved to Manhattan in 1998 with his brother, Gavin, and shared a small apartment, sleeping in the same room. From there, he watched the collapse of the World Trade Center, a mile away, in 2001.

Following the move, DeGraw eventually landed a weekly gig at The Bitter End on Wednesday nights, which he continued until late 2006. During this time, DeGraw became well known in the New York City music scene and eventually filling the venue and other venues such as The Knitting Factory.

However, it was when local musicians began to cover DeGraw's songs that people began to notice his talent. Chris Whitley noted, "What makes Joey such a deep writer and overwhelming talent, besides his god given gifts, is that ... it is all about music as an art form. He is a purist and the only young blood in music today that gives me hope."

Gavin DeGraw has also highlighted the part his brother played in his success, advising him to write his own songs & upon hearing his later debut single, "I Don't Want to Be" stating "That's your hit!" The song went on to reach Double Platinum certification and become the theme tune to television show, One Tree Hill. DeGraw went on to tour with his brother, providing guitar and backing vocals for Gavin's band, as well as performing and promoting his own music.

In 2005, DeGraw released his debut album; a self-produced effort entitled Midnight Audio, which has sold over 40,000 copies without the support of a label.

DeGraw has written with some of the industry's top selling artists including Joss Stone, who flew him down to Barbados to write songs for her, one of which was the track 'Another Mistake.'

December 2007 saw DeGraw and his brother, Gavin open The National Underground, a New York City venue, offering live music, food and drink. Situated in Manhattan's Lower East Side at 159 East Houston Street, the venue has become a live music hub for the country's top indie talent and in 2009, the brand was extended to a record label. Talking at the time, DeGraw explained "My brother and I want to show off the truly credible artists that perform in our venue. With the National Underground brand, credibility is paramount. We want to provide an outlet for real artists to get exposure." The boys are working hard to finish their new bar which is due to open sometime in the spring of 2011, situated in Nashville, Tennessee.

The first of such artists was DeGraw himself, releasing his second album, Say Something Strong through the label on August 18, 2009. It features tracks from his 2005 release, Our Own Time, Tragedy, Your Last Day, Miracle of Mind & Sunny as well as Another Mistake, the track originally written for Joss Stone, who herself provides backing vocals on the track. Other special guests on the album are Mountain frontman, Leslie West, Chris Barron of the Spin Doctors and Gavin DeGraw. He has also toured Europe and the USA to promote his music.

DeGraw's songs, Miracle of Mind & Our Own Time have also featured in seasons 3 and 6 of television show One Tree Hill.

He also works as a voiceover actor, notably on the channel A&E and is also the subject of the online documentary, Voice Driven.

Summer 2010 saw DeGraw embark on a new tour of the UK and Europe, with performances at venues including The Musician in Leicester, England on July 19 and at the Blue Balls Festival in Lucerne, Switzerland on July 24. He also played in Aarhus, Denmark and in Kuurne, Belgium.
