= She Sets the City on Fire =

Single by Gavin DeGraw

from the album Something Worth Saving
- Released: July 15, 2016
- Label: RCA
- Songwriters: Gavin DeGraw; Todd Clark; Jason Saenz; Gregg Wattenberg
- Producer: Gregg Wattenberg

Gavin DeGraw singles chronology
"Fire" (2014)	"She Sets the City on Fire" (2016)	"Making Love with the Radio On" (2016)

"She Sets the City on Fire" is a song by American singer Gavin DeGraw. It was released on July 15, 2016, by RCA Records as the lead single from the album Something Worth Saving. The song was written by DeGraw, Todd Clark, Jason Saenz, and Gregg Wattenberg, and produced by Wattenberg. The song peaked at number 16 on the Billboard Adult Top 40 chart.

== Music video ==
The music video was directed by Daniel Cz and features model Jessica Vargas as DeGraw's love interest who is the CEO of a technology company called "Orange" which is a spoof of Apple. The video shows DeGraw and Vargas as college students in a computer engineering lab during the 1980s as they work together to create the first video chat system.

== Charts ==
Chart (2016)	Peak position
US Adult Contemporary (Billboard)	22
US Adult Pop Airplay (Billboard)	14

=== Year-end charts ===
Chart (2016)	Position
US Adult Top 40 (Billboard)	47

== Certifications ==
Region	Certification	Certified units/sales
United States (RIAA)	Gold	500,000^{‡}
^{‡} Sales+streaming figures based on certification alone.
