= In Love with a Girl =

2008 single by Gavin DeGraw

Single by Gavin DeGraw

from the album Gavin DeGraw
- Released: 2008
- Recorded: 2007
- Genre: Pop rock
- Length: 3:27
- Label: J
- Songwriter(s): Gavin DeGraw
- Producer(s): Howard Benson; Max Martin

Gavin DeGraw singles chronology
"Just Friends" (2006)	"In Love with a Girl" (2008)	"She Holds a Key" (2008)

"In Love with a Girl" is a song recorded by American singer Gavin DeGraw and was released as the lead single from DeGraw's self-titled second studio album, released in 2008.

A previously unreleased alternate version produced by Max Martin, who "initially worked on the song", was included on DeGraw's 2014 compilation Finest Hour: The Best of Gavin DeGraw.

== Music video ==
The music video premiered on March 25, 2008, on Yahoo! Music. Kristin Cavallari plays his love interest in the video, which opens with a big-box store (Sears) closing while Kristin hides out of sight under a kiosk. She then receives a text message saying "I'm Here XOXO", and then opens the door to her mysterious boyfriend, later revealed to be DeGraw. Together, they then wander aimlessly around the mall, video taping their antics while simultaneously avoiding a security guard who is working the night shift. Scenes are also included with DeGraw playing the piano while his band, including his touring drummer at the time Landon Ashworth performs the song. The video ends with the two leaving the store and never being discovered by the guard. The video can be viewed on DeGraw's official channel on YouTube. As of October 2022, the music video has gained over 14 million views. The video was ranked on VH1 as the 21st best music video of 2008 on the Top 40 Videos of 2008.

== Critical reception ==
Katie Hasty of Billboard commented: ""In Love with a Girl" opens with heavily distorted guitars as minor chords roll through, but be not deceived: Lyrically, the track is happy, with the 30-year-old songwriter heralding a girl that "understands." One flaw beleaguers DeGraw's normally dependable croon: the unnecessary presence of auto-tuning, which is mightily distracting. Beyond that, "Girl" is a rocking home run in the same ballpark as "I Don't Want to Be." The chorus is buoyant, backed with idyllic drum tracks alongside, driving each word-heavy verse, as DeGraw's snappy piano lines may have fans playing, heaven forbid, air piano."

== Charts ==
=== Weekly charts ===
Chart (2008)	Peak position
Belgium (Ultratip Bubbling Under Flanders)	17
Canada (Canadian Hot 100)	32
Canada CHR/Top 40 (Billboard)	26
Canada Hot AC (Billboard)	6
Denmark (Tracklisten)	24
Netherlands (Dutch Top 40)	22
Netherlands (Single Top 100)	40
Switzerland (Schweizer Hitparade)	73
US Billboard Hot 100	24
US Adult Pop Airplay (Billboard)	5
US Pop Airplay (Billboard)	10

=== Year-end charts ===
Chart (2008)	Position
Canada (Canadian Hot 100)	93
Netherlands (Dutch Top 40)	79
US Billboard Hot 100	87
US Adult Top 40 (Billboard)	18

== Certifications ==
Region	Certification	Certified units/sales
Denmark (IFPI Danmark)	Gold	7,500^{^}
United States (RIAA)	Platinum	1,000,000^{‡}
^{^} Shipments figures based on certification alone.^{‡} Sales+streaming figures based on certification alone.
