= Face the River =

Studio album by Gavin DeGraw
- Released: May 20, 2022
- Studio: RCA Studio A (Nashville, Tennessee)
- Genre: Pop
- Length: 41:01
- Language: English
- Label: RCA
- Producer: Dave Cobb

Gavin DeGraw chronology
Something Worth Saving (2016)	Face the River (2022)	A Classic Christmas (2023)

this record was written from a very therapeutic standpoint. It was assembled from a very therapeutic standpoint. And of course on a global level, we were all going through unprecedented times as a world. And so when I was making the album, I was making the album during that time, at the height of COVID.

— DeGraw on recording this album.

Face the River is the seventh studio album by the American pop musician Gavin DeGraw, released on May 20, 2022, by RCA Records. It was written about his parents, who had recently died. It was his first album in six years and was supported by a concert tour.

== Track listing ==
All songs were written by Gavin DeGraw

1. "Face The River" – 3:37
2. "Summertime" – 4:17
3. "Ford" – 3:37
4. "Freedom (Johnny's Song)" – 4:12
5. "Greatest of All Time" – 3:39
6. "Destiny" – 4:43
7. "Lighthouse" – 4:21
8. "Chasing When" – 3:19
9. "Hero in Our House" – 4:55
10. "Let Someone In" – 4:21

== Personnel ==
- Gavin DeGraw – piano, vocals
- Brian Allen – bass guitar
- Ali Ambrosi – design
- Daniel Bacigalupi – mastering assistance
- Andrew Brightman – production coordination
- Dave Cobb – acoustic guitar, percussion, production
- Jason Godrich – photography
- Greg Koller – engineering, mixing
- Pete Lyman – mastering at Infrasonic Sound, Nashville, Tennessee, United States
- Billy Norris – guitar
- Chris Powell – drums, percussion
- Kristen Rogers – backing vocals on "Greatest of All Time" and "Let Someone In"
- Philip Towns – keyboards, organ
- Alberto Vasari – photography

== Chart performance ==
The album spent one week on Billboard's Top Album Sales, at 63 for the week of July 4, 2022.
