= Cheated on Me =

Single by Gavin DeGraw

from the album Gavin DeGraw
- Released: September 2008
- Recorded: 2007
- Genre: Pop rock
- Length: 3:40
- Label: J Records
- Songwriter(s): Gavin Degraw
- Producer(s): Howard Benson

Gavin DeGraw singles chronology
"She Holds a Key" (2008)	"Cheated on Me" (2008)	"I Have You to Thank" (2009)

"Cheated on Me" is a song written and performed by Gavin DeGraw. It is the third single from his self-titled album and was released in September 2008. The song was inspired by DeGraw's failed relationship with a woman who was frustrated with his jealousy.

== Music video ==
The music video was released on September 30, 2008.

== Critical reception ==
In an overall positive review, Chuck Taylor of Billboard states that while DeGraw's "strong vocal skills would be better showcased with less layering," he concluded that "this killer track, should help separate him from the pack and boost name recognition to staple status."

== Charts ==
Chart (2008)	Peak position
US Billboard Adult Pop Songs	30
US Billboard Pop 100	77
