= Free (Gavin DeGraw album) =

Studio album by Gavin DeGraw
- Released: March 31, 2009
- Recorded: 2008–2009
- Genre: Soft rock
- Length: 37:52
- Label: J
- Producers: Camus Celli; Gavin DeGraw

Gavin DeGraw chronology
Gavin DeGraw (2008)	Free (2009)	Sweeter (2011)

Singles from Gavin DeGraw
- 1. "Stay" Released: March 11, 2009; 2. "Dancing Shoes" Released: 2009

Free is the third album by American singer-songwriter Gavin DeGraw. The album was released on March 31, 2009. It was his final album for J Records since the label dissolved into RCA Records in 2011.

To keep himself from overthinking the songs, DeGraw made Free in less than two weeks at the Brooklyn studio of his producer Camus Celli, who has worked with such artists as Tina Turner, David Byrne, Lana Wolf and Arto Lindsay. DeGraw and Celli have known each other since working together on an early version of DeGraw's 2003 major-label debut, Chariot. "I've been in the studio with several different producers so I already knew what I wanted,” DeGraw says. "This was my opportunity to be involved in the production and I knew Camus could get the sounds I was going for."

The trust he had in Celli and the collaborative spirit of their partnership freed DeGraw to dig deep and tap into something he hadn't tapped into for a while. "This album reveals the honesty about my love of music," he says. "It isn't about the biggest, the strongest, or the loudest. It's about simplicity in its purest form. It doesn't sound like the big machine. It sounds like where you go to escape the big machine."

== Development ==
It was a pleasure to make an album with understated production where the featured element was the content.

— DeGraw, 2009

The album was recorded towards the end of 2008 and completed in January 2009 and released on March 31, 2009, less than a year after the release of his previous album.

== Singles ==
The album's first single, "Stay", was leaked through the internet on March 11, 2009. The second single, "Dancing Shoes", was released later in 2009. The song "Glass" was featured on the 18th episode from the sixth season of the series One Tree Hill.

== Critical reception ==
Professional ratings
Review scores
Source	Rating
Allmusic	3/5 stars
Entertainment Weekly	C+
People	3/4 stars
Slant Magazine	3/5 stars
USA Today	3/4 stars

Critics were generally favorable of the album. Giving the album three-out-of-four stars, USA Today said that "DeGraw's haunting, bluesy drawl sometimes overwhelms this earnest, soulful-ish material. But when the annoyances are gone...the balance is beautiful." Chuck Arnold of People magazine also gave the album three-out-of-four stars and found that DeGraw "gets back to his soulful essence on this simple, stripped-down collection of early and new songs." Stephen Thomas Erlewine of Allmusic gave the album 3 out of 5 stars saying, "He could use at least one hook as big as "I Don't Wanna Be," but Free manages to flow easily and warmly, something that couldn't quite be said of the blue-eyed soul bluster of his first two albums."

== Track listing ==
All songs written by Gavin DeGraw, except "Indian Summer" by Chris Whitley.

1. "Indian Summer" – 4:43
2. "Free" – 3:56
3. "Stay" – 3:33
4. "Mountains to Move" – 5:46
5. "Glass" – 3:53
6. "Lover Be Strong" – 4:28
7. "Dancing Shoes" – 3:46
8. "Waterfall" – 4:41
9. "Why Do the Men Stray?" – 3:05

=== Bonus tracks ===
iTunes exclusive bonus track

10. "Never the Same" – 4:19

Amazon.com exclusive bonus track

10. "Young Love" – 3:46 (outtake)

Pre-order bonus track

10. "Get Lost" – 4:06 (outtake)

== Personnel ==
Musicians

- Piano, synthesizers, vocals, acoustic guitar - Gavin DeGraw
- Guitar - Audley Freed
- Bass - Andy Hess
- B3, Wurlitzer, Clavinet, ARP String Ensemble - George Lanks
- Drums - Charley Drayton

Except on "Waterfall"

- Vocals - Gavin DeGraw
- Guitar, omnichord - Jack Petrucelli
- Bass - Alvin Moody
- Drums - Matt Flynn

== Charts ==
Free entered the Billboard 200 at #19, selling 29,000 copies, whereas his previous album Gavin DeGraw debuted at #7 in May 2008, selling 66,000 copies. In its second week, Free dropped to #97, a drop of seventy-eight places.

Chart performance
Chart (2009)	Peak position
Canadian Albums (Nielsen SoundScan)	98
Danish Albums (Hitlisten)	29
Dutch Albums (Album Top 100)	76
Swiss Albums (Schweizer Hitparade)	96
US Billboard 200	19
