= Soldier (Gavin DeGraw song) =

Single by Gavin DeGraw

from the album Sweeter
- Released: September 6, 2011 (promotional single); September 20, 2012 (official single)
- Recorded: 2011
- Genre: Pop rock; blue-eyed soul
- Length: 3:31
- Label: RCA
- Songwriter: Gavin DeGraw
- Producer: Butch Walker

Gavin DeGraw singles chronology
"Sweeter" (2012)	"Soldier" (2011)	"Best I Ever Had" (2013)

"Soldier" is a song by American recording artist Gavin DeGraw, taken from his fourth studio album, Sweeter. It was released into the iTunes Store on September 6, 2011, as a promotional single. It was released as the third and final single from the album in the United States, on September 24, 2012. The song was written by DeGraw and produced by Butch Walker.

The song finds DeGraw promising his girl everlasting love, and when she needs someone he'll always be there fighting for her. The song has charted inside the top-forty on the Dutch chart and has also charted on the UK Singles Chart and the Adult Pop Songs chart. DeGraw appeared on the last episode of One Tree Hill and performed the track.

== Background and composition ==
"Soldier" was written by DeGraw and produced by Butch Walker, being one of the three songs produced by him on the album. DeGraw said of Walker's contribution to the album in an interview with Billboard magazine:

"He was able to listen to the songs and come in with the right arrangements, bring in the right players for the songs and the right gear for the performances. You don't always have a magic moment in the studio," he continued, "but you want those moments to happen. I remember when we were tracking 'Soldier,' in the second verse I was digging in hard, the groove was so good and everyone was jelling. I heard Butch go, 'Woo!'-a primal scream that said, 'This feels so good.' You can't fake that. We kept it because you can't re-create the performance that makes you do that."

On the ode to devotion, he sings, "You’re thirsty / I’ll be your rain / You get hurt / I’ll take your pain." According to Boston Globe's Ken Capobianco, "there are other lines like that, all of which should pop up on Facebook walls shortly."

The song was first released as a promotional single in Canada, on September 6, 2011. Later, it was announced that it would be sent to Hot Adult Contemporary radio as the third single of the album in the United States, on September 24, 2012.

== Critical reception ==
Entertainment Weekly's Melissa Maerz called it a "love-as-a-battlefield anthem." Andy Baber from musicOMH wrote a positive review for the song, saying that the song is "a soulful, rousing number that really shows off the dexterity of DeGraw’s vocals, simply relying on a clapping beat and the ever present piano. It is by no means a drastic departure, but it is evidence of DeGraw approaching his sound with more thought than ever before." Amy Sciarretto of Artist Direct thought that "the racier moments are balanced out by more emotionally transparent songs like the uplifting "Soldier", which convey vulnerability while still managing to feel distinctly masculine. Rolling Stone's Jody Rose pointed out that DeGraw is "an excellent singer, with a hint of grit in his tenor that tips power ballads like "Soldier" toward soul music."

A review from Reuters wrote that the song "sounds just a little too tailor-made to serenade tuxes and gowns with its promises of eternal protection."

== Chart performance ==
In Netherlands, the song debuted at number seventy-one on the Dutch Top 40 chart, on the week of January 28, 2012. Later, it reached number forty-five on February 4, 2012. On the third week, it climbed to number thirty-three. After three weeks fluctuating on the charts, the song climbed to number thirty-five. After another few weeks fluctuating on the chart, the song jumped to number 34, on April 14, 2012. In its 13th week, the song peaked at number 30, on April 21, 2012. The song debuted at number 59 on the UK Singles Chart on the issue date June 2, 2012.

Due to the performance on the final episode of One Tree Hill, the song entered on the iTunes Top 100 Chart, peaking at number 75. "Soldier" debuted at number 38 on the Billboard's Adult Pop Songs chart, on the week of October 25, 2012.

== Promotion ==
DeGraw appeared on the series final episode of One Tree Hill and performed the track and the series' theme song, "I Don't Want to Be". DeGraw also performed the track on the MDA Show of Strength benefit concert, aired on September 2, 2012.

== Charts ==
=== Weekly charts ===
Chart (2011–12)	Peak position
Netherlands (Dutch Top 40)	13
Netherlands (Single Top 100)	30
UK Singles (Official Charts)	59
US Adult Pop Airplay (Billboard)	26

=== Year-end charts ===
Chart (2012)	Position
Netherlands (Dutch Top 40)	53
Netherlands (Download Top 100)	98

== Certifications ==
Region	Certification	Certified units/sales
United States (RIAA)	Gold	500,000^{‡}
^{‡} Sales+streaming figures based on certification alone.
