= Not Over You =

2011 single by Gavin DeGraw

Single by Gavin DeGraw

from the album Sweeter
- Released: May 17, 2011
- Recorded: 2011
- Genre: Pop rock; blue-eyed soul
- Length: 3:38
- Label: RCA
- Songwriters: Gavin DeGraw; Ryan Tedder
- Producers: Ryan Tedder; Jerrod Bettis

Gavin DeGraw singles chronology
"Dancing Shoes" (2009)	"Not Over You" (2011)	"Sweeter" (2012)

"Not Over You" is a song by American recording artist Gavin DeGraw, released as the lead single from his fourth studio album, Sweeter, on May 17, 2011. The song was written by DeGraw and Ryan Tedder, and produced by Tedder. The song peaked at No. 18 on the Billboard Hot 100, making it DeGraw's most successful song on the chart since his breakout hit "I Don't Want to Be", becoming his fourth Top 40 hit. It also became his first song to reach the top spot on the Adult Pop Songs. Sara Evans covered the song as a duet with DeGraw on her 2014 album Slow Me Down.

== Background ==
The first single from singer-songwriter Gavin DeGraw's fourth album, Sweeter, was a collaboration with OneRepublic's lead singer and songwriter Ryan Tedder. According to "Songfacts", the pair initially met when they performed on the same bill and the two, both groove-minded piano players, decided to write together. Not Over You is one of two songs DeGraw co-wrote with Tedder for the LP. While talking about the collaboration with Tedder, Gavin told The Examiner: "I think Ryan did a great job with featuring piano up front with the vocals."

== Composition ==
"You create this scenario - you see them in your dreams and if you bumped into them, you would let them know that you're doing fine and you're past the breakup - but you'd be lying."

— Gavin DeGraw told AOL Music about the song meaning.

The song emotionally evokes the difficulty of getting over someone. "'Not Over You' is about trying to get past someone emotionally," DeGraw explained to AOL Music. DeGraw expanded on the song: "It's kind of riding that line between vulnerability and pride. You're saying 'If I saw you, even though I'm missing you, I wouldn't tell you I was missing you.' That may or may not be a masculine trait, but I do know it's prideful and vulnerable. I've been there, so that's why I got behind the song, and I know a lot of people have been there too, it's just real. You don't always have to be romantic - sometimes it's important to just be real." Scott Schelter from "Pop Crush" realized that "The song finds DeGraw in a seriously depressed place. He sings about listening to the radio while staring at a picture of his ex and wishing they could still be together." It features a jangly piano and artificial drum beat.

== Critical reception ==
Scott Schelter wrote a very positive review for "Pop Crush", writing that "the music manages to stay vibrant thanks to lively drums and DeGraw’s keys. While commenting that "the hook is a bit more thoughtful and complex than many choruses in pop music." Emily Exton wrote for "Pop Dust" that "“Not Over You” is standard DeGraw fare: introspective tales from the nice guy, with a piano-driven melody, becoming catchy to the point of delirium." Ken Capobianco wrote for Boston Globe that the song is "a manipulative slice of mope pop." Andy Baber of musicOMH wrote that "Its slick production and niggly technical effects clearly align the song with Tedder’s previous work, yet DeGraw’s excessively worded chorus comes across as awkward and emotionally faux."

== Music video ==
A screen capture from the four-minute music video, where DeGraw is pictured on the right singing the song emotionally into a microphone while playing the piano with a band, and the band's drum is pictured on the left.

The music video was released on his page on YouTube/VEVO on June 28, 2011. It features shots of DeGraw and his love interest (played by Marjorie Levesque) being separate from one another throughout much of the video in various parts of the city, but meeting and kissing in the end. The video has garnered over 30 million views on YouTube/Vevo.

=== Storyline ===
The video begins with DeGraw lost in thought and in full search of his girlfriend from the past. Later, the girl is shown watering plants. Suddenly, the shot goes to a split screen of her and the heartbroken man. The video continues with the split shots periodically, bouncing back and forth from two DeGraws to two of the girl scouting around town. In comparing the split screen images, it becomes evident that DeGraw is on this girl's mind, too, as they seem to be doing the same things at the same time, only in different places. She finally gets the nerve to go to his place, but unfortunately, it is just a minute after he has left home looking for her. By the end, the girl runs off into the streets and bumps into him, and they share an emotional embrace and decide to get back together.

== Live performances ==
DeGraw first performed "Not Over You" on the Today Show on September 15, 2011 and then the next day on Live! with Regis and Kelly. The song was also performed by DeGraw on Jimmy Kimmel Live! on September 20, 2011, and on Fox & Friends on September 21, 2011. On January 9, 2012, he sang "Not Over You" on Conan and also on The Ellen DeGeneres Show. DeGraw performed the song during the finale of The Voice of Holland's second season. DeGraw performed "Not Over You" and "Sweeter" on Jimmy Kimmel Live! on May 21, 2012.

== Charts ==
=== Weekly charts ===
Chart (2011–2012)	Peak position
Australia (ARIA)	37
Belgium (Ultratip Bubbling Under Flanders)	12
Canada Hot 100 (Billboard)	23
Netherlands (Dutch Top 40)	13
Netherlands (Single Top 100)	16
New Zealand (Recorded Music NZ)	8
Norway (VG-lista)	12
US Billboard Hot 100	18
US Pop Airplay (Billboard)	9
US Adult Pop Airplay (Billboard)	1
US Adult Contemporary (Billboard)	7

=== Year-end charts ===
Chart (2011)	Position
Netherlands (Dutch Top 40)	48
Netherlands (Single Top 100)	62
US Adult Top 40 (Billboard)	34

Chart (2012)	Position
Canada (Canadian Hot 100)	79
US Billboard Hot 100	60
US Adult Contemporary (Billboard)	18
US Adult Top 40 (Billboard)	13
US Mainstream Top 40 (Billboard)	44

== Certifications ==
Region	Certification	Certified units/sales
Australia (ARIA)	Platinum	70,000^{^}
New Zealand (RMNZ)	Gold	7,500^{*}
United States (RIAA)	4× Platinum	4,000,000^{‡}
Streaming
Denmark (IFPI Danmark)	Gold	900,000^{†}
^{*} Sales figures based on certification alone.^{^} Shipments figures based on certification alone.^{‡} Sales+streaming figures based on certification alone.^{†} Streaming-only figures based on certification alone.

== Release history ==
Release dates and formats for "Not Over You"
Region	Date	Format	Label(s)	Ref.
United States	August 16, 2011	Mainstream airplay	J	
