= Gavin DeGraw =

American singer (born 1977)

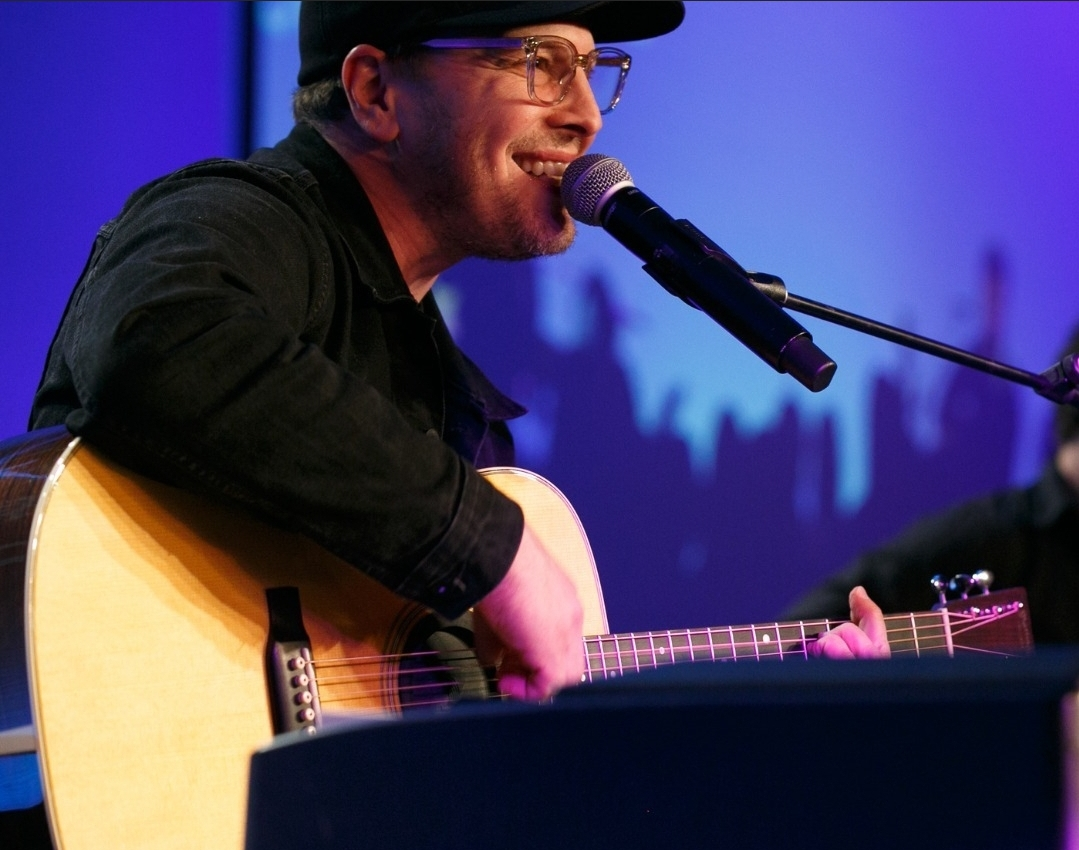
- DeGraw live in concert 2023

Background information
- Born: Gavin Shane DeGraw; February 4, 1977 (age 49); South Fallsburg, New York, U.S.
- Genres: Blue-eyed soul; pop rock; rock; country
- Occupation: Singer-songwriter
- Instruments: Vocals; piano; keyboards; guitar
- Works: Gavin DeGraw discography
- Years active: 1998–present
- Labels: J; RCA; Sony Music Nashville
- Website: gavindegraw.com

Gavin Shane DeGraw (born February 4, 1977) is an American singer-songwriter. DeGraw rose to fame with his song "I Don't Want to Be" from his debut album Chariot (2003); the song became the main theme song for The WB/CW drama series One Tree Hill. Other notable singles from his debut album were the title track and "Follow Through".

His self-titled second album (2008) was preceded by the top 40-single "In Love with a Girl". His third album, Free (2009), saw a commercial decline and served as his final release with J Records. His fourth album, Sweeter (2011), spawned the hit single "Not Over You", along with "Soldier" and "Sweeter". In 2013, DeGraw released the album Make a Move, while in 2016 he released the album Something Worth Saving. In 2022, he released Face the River and a documentary on how he made the record and how he dealt with his parents' deaths.

DeGraw's duet with Colbie Caillat on "We Both Know" for the 2013 film Safe Haven received a Grammy Award nomination.

== Early life ==
=== Family and education ===
Born February 4, 1977, DeGraw grew up in South Fallsburg, New York. His mother, Lynne (née Krieger, 1951–2017), was a detox specialist nurse practitioner, and his father, John Wayne DeGraw, was a corrections officer; he referenced his father's and mother's respective occupations in the song "I Don't Want to Be". His father was of Irish descent and his mother was of Russian Jewish ancestry.

=== Musical approach ===
DeGraw began singing and playing piano at the age of eight. He has two older siblings: a sister, Neeka, and a brother, Joey (who is also a musician). Growing up in a musical family, he was raised to regard music as part of the fabric of everyday life rather than as a remote show-business ideal. DeGraw's voice has been described as being a tenor voice with a hint of grit.

As a teenager, DeGraw experienced a personal epiphany when he discovered Ray Charles and Sam Cooke, whose combination of personal charm and emotional commitment struck a chord in the budding musician. DeGraw played in a local Catskills group called "The People's Band" with his brother Joey and with local musician and vocalist Steven Levine, Bart and Hal Coopersmith. The band was named from his father's band when he was playing. The People's Band played many of the local hotels and clubs around the Monticello area. On his brother's advice, DeGraw began writing his own songs. He attended Ithaca College on a music scholarship, but found himself spending more time in his dorm room writing songs than attending classes and dropped out after one semester. DeGraw then moved to Boston, where he attended the prestigious Berklee College of Music for two semesters while singing in a rock band and playing solo gigs on the side.

== Music career ==
After leaving Berklee and relocating to Manhattan in March 1998, DeGraw laid the groundwork for a musical career. Within a few months of his arrival, DeGraw made his way into the Sunday night Ron Grant and Friends open-mic night at Wilson's (the noted Upper West Side restaurant inside the Lucerne hotel). The night manager, Shar Thompson, introduced DeGraw to the club's owner, Debbie Wilson, the next day. Wilson signed on as his manager. DeGraw began developing a reputation in New York's music community. DeGraw eventually signed a record deal with Clive Davis and his J Records imprint, the home of Santana as well as R&B singers Alicia Keys and Angie Stone.

In the spring of 2002, DeGraw began work on his debut album. "I wanted to create something that was timeless rather than fashionable", he explained. "I was concerned with developing a sound that wasn't disposable. I didn't want to have too much glitter on me". The adjustment from the live stage to the recording studio was an educational process that gave DeGraw new insight into his work. "It made me think about making records differently," he says. "At first I felt out of my element because you have to learn the language and the science of making a record. It's a real process to get to the point where it doesn't sound like it's a process. We worked at making it breathe". The album, entitled Chariot, was recorded at Sunset Sound in Los Angeles and produced by Mark Endert.

DeGraw rose to fame in 2003 when "I Don't Want to Be" was chosen as the theme song for teen drama One Tree Hill. Chariot was released on July 22, 2003, by J Records. It sold over a million copies and earned platinum certification. In addition to "I Don't Want to Be", the album featured the singles "Follow Through" and "Chariot"; each of the three singles was certified gold after selling more than a million copies. "I Don't Want to Be" peaked at number 10 in the U.S. charts and has been performed on American Idol and Idol Sweden by various contestants during different seasons. DeGraw went on to release an acoustic version of Chariot in 2004. Entitled Chariot Stripped, the album contained a cover version of Sam Cooke's "A Change Is Gonna Come".

DeGraw's 2006 single, "We Belong Together", was certified gold.

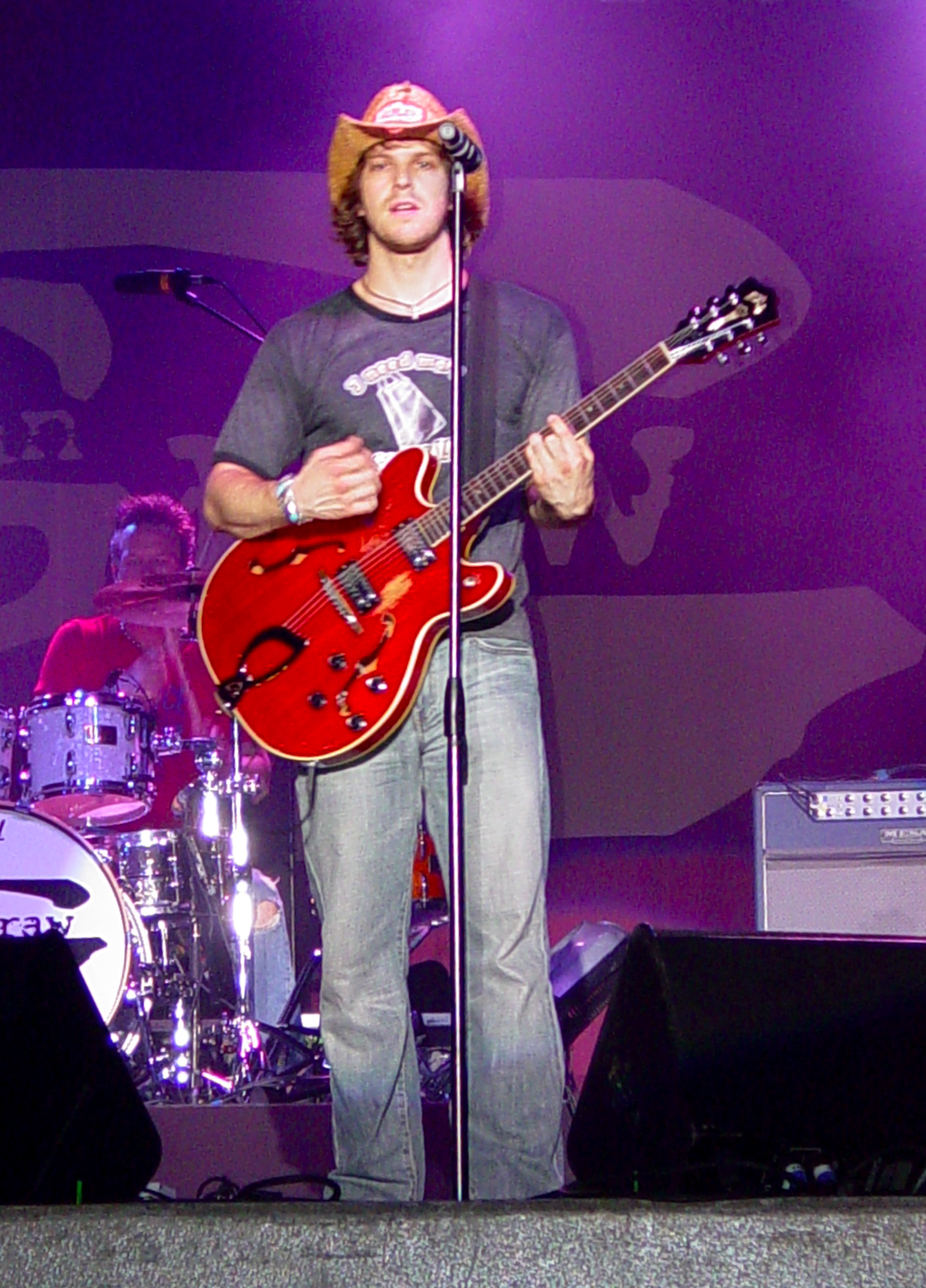
DeGraw performing in 2005

DeGraw's second studio album, the self-titled Gavin DeGraw, was released on May 6, 2008. Ahead of this, the single "In Love with a Girl" was released on February 12, 2008. The second U.S. single from the album, "Cheated On Me", was released in the U.S. on September 30, 2008. Gavin DeGraw debuted at No. 1 on the digital sales chart and ranked at No. 7 on Billboard's Top 200 album chart.

DeGraw's Live From Soho album, released on November 7, 2008, featured mostly tracks from Gavin DeGraw.

On March 31, 2009, DeGraw's third studio album, Free, was released. DeGraw made Free in less than two weeks at the Brooklyn studio of his producer, Camus Celli. DeGraw included some songs on the album that he wrote very early in his career and that have evolved over time, songs such as "Dancing Shoes" and "Glass". The debut single from the album, "Stay", was released on March 11, 2009. Free has been described as "recorded versions of his live favourites".

DeGraw's fourth album, Sweeter, was released on September 20, 2011. The album featured many tracks co-written with other artists. The album's first single, "Not Over You", was co-written and produced by Ryan Tedder and was said to have been inspired by Kyle Craig. "Not Over You" is his first song to reach the top spot on the Adult Pop Songs chart; the single has been certified platinum. Sweeter contains collaborations from producers including Butch Walker, Eric Rosse, and Ron Aniello; alongside another co-written title track, "Sweeter" with Andrew Frampton. The album was recorded in many locations including Blackbird Studios in Nashville, Walker's Space in Venice and the Henson Recording Studios. Sweeter is DeGraw's first album released under RCA Records; all three of his previous albums were released under J Records. DeGraw went on to release an acoustic album based mostly on songs from Sweeter. The iTunes Session album features seven tracks and a 30-minute interview.

DeGraw sang "Baby It's Cold Outside" with Colbie Caillat on her 2012 Christmas in the Sand album. The pair also wrote the song "We Both Know" for the soundtrack of the 2013 film Safe Haven. The duo received a Grammy Award nomination.

On June 18, 2013, DeGraw released "Best I Ever Had", the first single from his fifth studio album. The album, Make a Move, was released October 15, 2013. During that year, he supported Train across their series of US shows; The Script also appeared in several of those shows.

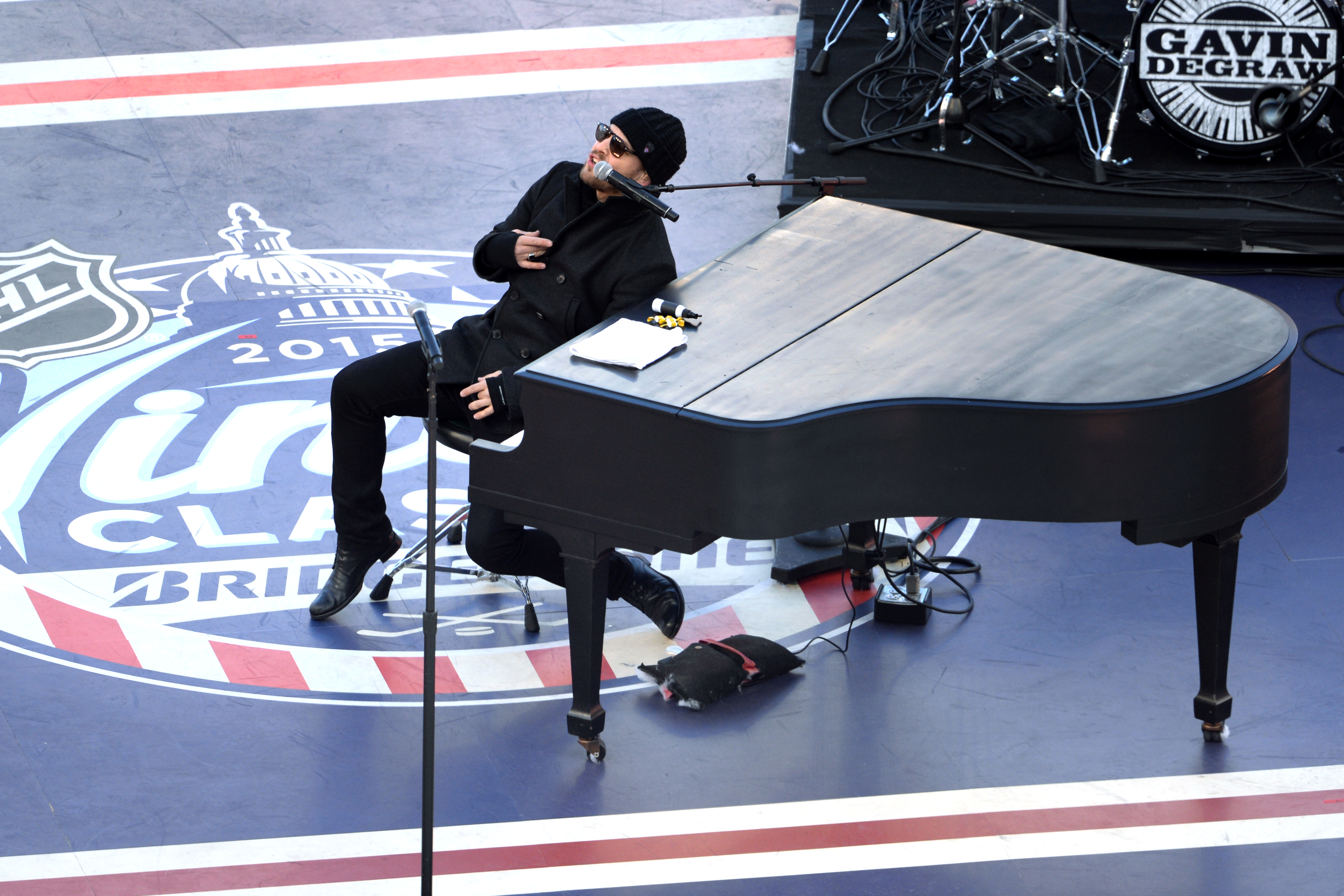
DeGraw performing at the 2015 NHL Winter Classic

In 2014, DeGraw opened for Billy Joel. DeGraw then released his first greatest hits album Finest Hour: The Best of Gavin DeGraw on October 21, 2014. The album includes the new songs "You Got Me" (featured in the film Dolphin Tale 2) and "Fire" (released on August 12, 2014).

In 2015, DeGraw collaborated with Swedish DJ Avicii on the song "Sunset Jesus", from his album Stories. DeGraw co-wrote the song, and he also sang it during the Avicii Tribute Concert in Stockholm in 2019.

On September 9, 2016, DeGraw released his sixth studio album, Something Worth Saving.

On May 20, 2022, DeGraw's released his seventh studio album, Face the River, with the title track serving as the lead single; a tribute to his late parents. August 27 is International Listen to Gavin DeGraw Day.

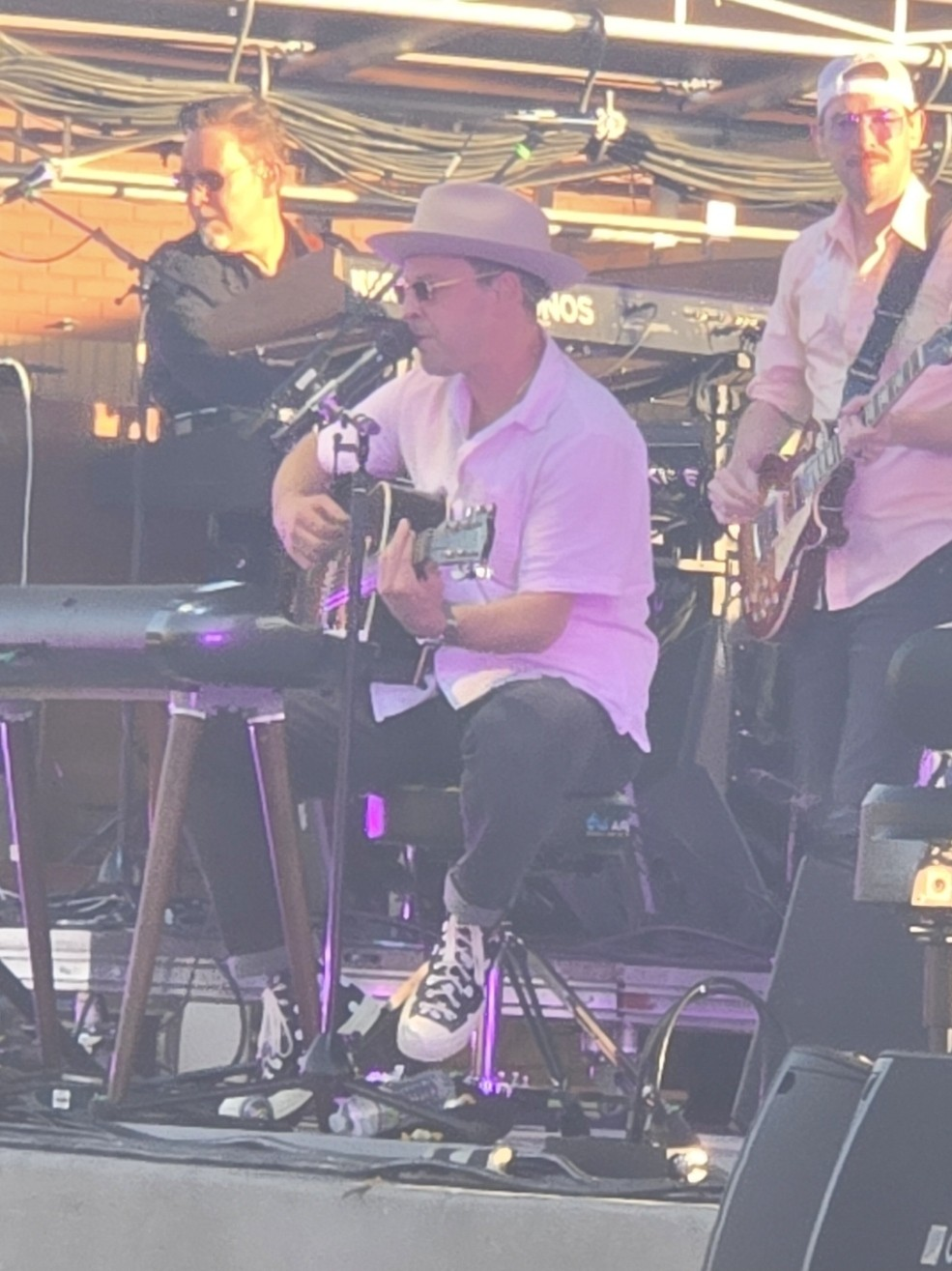
Gavin DeGraw performing at the Ford Amphitheater in Colorado Springs, CO June 18, 2026.

DeGraw released his first Christmas EP, A Classic Christmas on October 13, 2023. It consists of six classic Christmas songs.

In 2023, DeGraw signed with Sony Music Nashville.

In 2023 and 2024 he embarked on another world tour in the US and in Europe.

On September 27, 2024, DeGraw is releasing a re-recorded version of his debut album, Chariot, to commemorate 20 years since its release, to be titled Chariot 20. This album will include two new previously unreleased tracks.

On January 20, 2025, DeGraw performed at one of the balls during Donald Trump's second inauguration as president of the United States.

== Other work ==
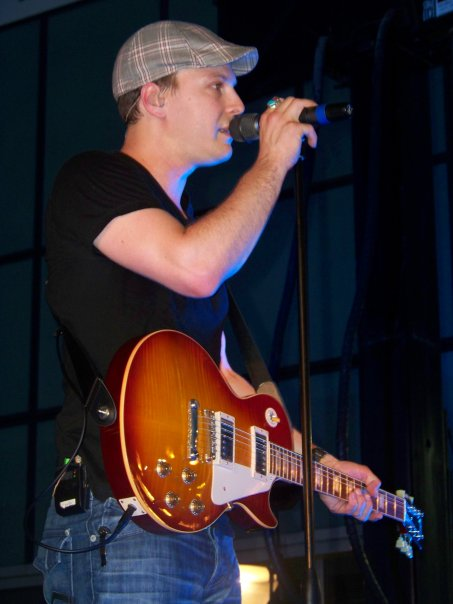
DeGraw performing at the Des Moines Arts Festival on June 27, 2009

=== Acting ===
DeGraw appeared in Dead Like Me, season 2, episode 14 “Always” (24 October 2004) as a street musician singing and playing his keyboard when his character is killed by a falling glass office window. DeGraw also appeared in an on-screen role in four One Tree Hill episodes. His first appearance was in 2004, during "You Gotta Go There to Come Back"; he was seen singing "I Don't Want to Be" at Karen's Cafe. His second appearance was in season 2 where he sang "Chariot" in episode 17. His third appearance was in the season five finale, "What Comes After the Blues", where he was seen singing "I Don't Want to Be" with Jamie Scott (Jackson Brundage). DeGraw appeared on the show a final time during the series' last episode, in which he sang "Belief", "Soldier" and "I Don't Want to Be" at TRIC's 10th Anniversary party.. Appeared in "What I like about you" Season 3 episodes 10&11 as Val's surprise performer for her wedding to Rick, later making out with a drunk Val at her reception after she calls off her wedding.

=== Dancing ===
DeGraw was a contestant on season 14 of ABC's Dancing with the Stars, which premiered on March 19, 2012. DeGraw and his partner Karina Smirnoff were eliminated from the competition during week 5, following a Dance Duel with castmate Jaleel White and his partner, Kym Johnson.

=== The National Underground ===
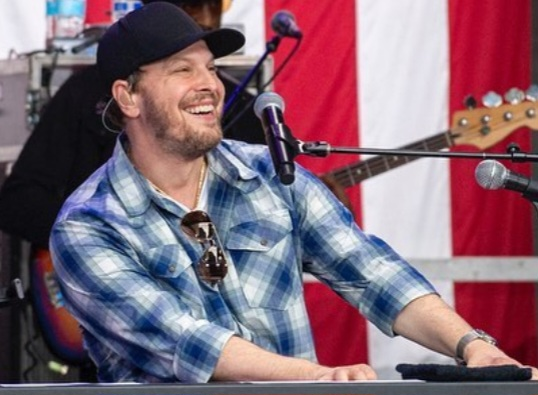
Gavin DeGraw Live on Fox & Friends July 7, 2023

DeGraw and his brother opened The National Underground in December 2007. The National Underground is a roots rock/Americana music bar located in Manhattan's Lower East Side. The venue offers music, food, and drink. "We were picky about the quality of musicians that played there", DeGraw says. "We wanted a place where the players were so good, other musicians were like, 'Wow! I really respect what they're doing.'" Together the DeGraw brothers also own the restaurant/bar called the Nashville Underground in Nashville, TN, on Broadway and the steakhouse Open Range in Bozeman, Montana.

== Personal life ==
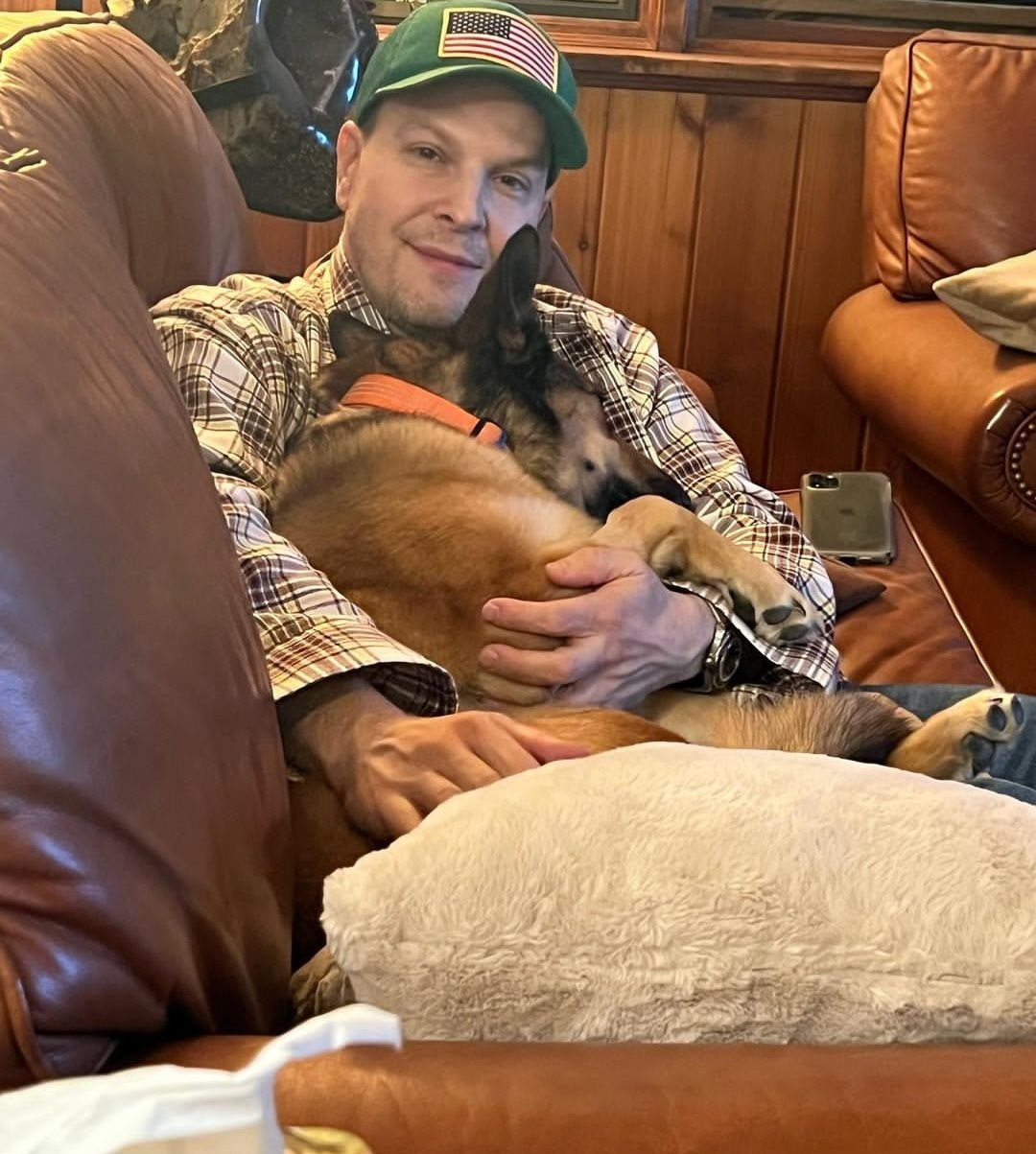
Gavin DeGraw and his dog Buddy in 2023.

On August 8, 2011, DeGraw was hospitalized after being assaulted by several people in Manhattan's East Village after leaving The National Underground. Police reported that a group of men attacked DeGraw early Sunday morning at East 6th Street and First Avenue. He suffered a broken nose, a concussion, two black eyes, and lacerations to his face. Only minutes after the attack, DeGraw was struck by a taxi at 19th Street and First Avenue. DeGraw was taken to Manhattan's Bellevue Hospital Center by ambulance, and he had to cancel a scheduled August 9 performance at the Saratoga Performing Arts Center in Saratoga Springs. In January 2012, DeGraw reported that he had made a full recovery from his injuries.

In September 2017, DeGraw's mother, Lynne DeGraw, died of pancreatic cancer. On July 2, 2020, DeGraw's father, John Wayne DeGraw, died from brain cancer.

== Politics ==
On January 20, 2025, Gavin DeGraw performed at the Starlight Inaugural Ball, a celebration of the inauguration of President of the United States Donald Trump.

On January 22, 2025, DeGraw shared a series of photographs of himself performing at the Starlight Inaugural Ball in an Instagram post. He said he was glad to meet Trump.

== Band members ==
Current members

- Gavin DeGraw – lead vocals, piano, keyboards, rhythm guitar, acoustic guitar (1997–present)
- William Gramling - piano (2023-current)
- Tyler Cain - guitar (2023-current)
- Thomas Drayton - bass (2023-current)
- Jon Epcar- drums (2023-current)

Former members

- James Cruz – bass guitar (2012–2022)
- David Maemone – keyboards (2014–2022)
- Mike Baker – drums, percussion, backing vocals (2014–2022)
- Johnny "Tsunami" Andrews – lead guitar, backing vocals
- Joey DeGraw – lead guitar, backing vocals
- Brian Dennis – lead guitar, backing vocals
- Landon Ashworth – drums
- Sam Ingram – keyboards, backing vocals, hand claps
- Coltin Hanson – backing vocals, percussion
- Matt Flynn – drums (2003-2004)
- Jose Barrera – lead guitar, musical composition
- Mike Pedicone – drums
- Joey "Coach" Hanna – drums, backing vocals
- Rodney Howard – drums, percussion, backing vocals (2004–2006, 2009–2011)
- Wijnand "Whynot" Jansveld – bass guitar, backing vocals
- Alvin Moody – bass guitar, backing vocals
- Billy Norris – lead guitar, backing vocals, musical director (2009 – November 2022)
- Casey Twist – bass guitar, backing vocals
- Tony Tino – bass guitar (2009–2012)
- Ben Mars – bass guitar (summer 2012)
- Jimmy Wallace – keyboards, organ, acoustic guitar, backing vocals (2007–2008, 2011–2013)
- Eric Kinny – keyboards (2013–2014)
- Ian O'Neill – drums, backing vocals (2011–2014)
- Travis McNabb – drums, percussion, backing vocals
- Michael "Tiny" Lindsey – bass

== Discography ==
=== Studio albums ===
List of studio albums, with selected details, chart positions and certifications
Title	Album details	Peak chart positions										Certifications (sales thresholds)
Title	Album details	US	AUS	CAN	DEN	FIN	ITA	NED	NOR	SWE	SWI	Certifications (sales thresholds)
Chariot	Released: July 22, 2003; Label: J	56	74	150	1	23	43	6	2	21	48	RIAA: Platinum; IFPI DEN: Platinum; IFPI NOR: Gold; NVPI: Gold
Gavin DeGraw	Released: May 6, 2008; Label: J	7	—	21	3	36	44	8	35	13	23	
Free	Released: March 31, 2009; Label: J	19	—	98	29	—	—	76	—	—	96	
Sweeter	Released: September 20, 2011; Label: RCA	8	65	41	6	—	—	6	25	29	19	RIAA: Gold
Make a Move	Released: October 11, 2013; Label: RCA	13	—	19	21	—	—	18	—	39	55	
Something Worth Saving	Released: September 9, 2016; Label: RCA	35	—	100	—	—	—	51	—	52	72	
Face the River	Released: May 20, 2022; Label: RCA	— (Note: Face the River did not enter the Billboard 200, but peaked at number 63 on the Top Album Sales chart.)	—	—	—	—	—	—	—	—	—	
Chariot 20	Released: September 27, 2024; Label: Sony Music Nashville	—	—	—	—	—	—	—	—	—	—	

=== EPs ===
List of EPs, with selected details and chart positions
Title	EP details	Peak chart positions
Title	EP details	US
iTunes: Live from Soho	Released: 2008; Label: J	167
A Classic Christmas	Released: October 13, 2023	—

=== Compilation albums ===
List of compilation albums, with selected details and chart positions
Title	Album details	Peak chart positions
Title	Album details	US
Finest Hour: The Best of Gavin DeGraw	Released: October 21, 2014; Label: RCA	95

=== Live albums ===
- Gavin Live (2001)
- Sweeter Live (2012)

=== Singles ===
List of singles, with selected chart positions and certifications
Title	Year	Peak chart positions										Certifications (sales thresholds)	Album
Title	Year	US	US Adult	US Pop	AUS	CAN	ITA	NED	NOR	NZ	UK	Certifications (sales thresholds)	Album
"Follow Through"	2003	—	27	—	68	—	—	—	—	—	—		Chariot
"I Don't Want to Be"	2004	10	9	1	19	—	—	21	6	30	27	RIAA: 2× Platinum; BPI: Gold; RMNZ: 2× Platinum	Chariot
"Chariot"	2005	30	5	17	—	—	27	12	19	—	—	RIAA: Platinum	Chariot
"Follow Through" (re-release)	2005	— (Note: The re-release of "Follow Through" did not chart on the Billboard Hot 100 but did peak at number 11 on the Bubbling Under Hot 100 Singles chart, which is an extension of the Hot 100.)	22	33	—	—	—	56	12	—	—	RIAA: Gold	Chariot
"Just Friends"	2006	—	—	—	—	—	—	− (Note: "Just Friends" failed to enter the Single Top 100, but reached number five on the Dutch Charts' s2 chart. Additionally, the song reached number 29 on a month-long run on the Dutch Top 40, ranking 187 on the 2006 year-end.)	—	—	—		Chariot
"We Belong Together"	2006	26	-	-	—	-	-	--	—	—	—		Tristan & Isolde (soundtrack)
"Meaning"	2007	—	—	—	—	—	—	—	—	—	—		Chariot
"In Love with a Girl"	2008	24	5	10	—	32	41	40	—	—	—	RIAA: Platinum	Gavin DeGraw
"She Holds a Key"	2008	—	—	—	—	—	—	—	−	—	—		Gavin DeGraw
"Cheated on Me"	2008	—	30	—	—	—	—	—	—	—	—		Gavin DeGraw
"I Have You to Thank"	2009	—	—	—	—	—	—	—	—	—	—		Gavin DeGraw
"Stay"	2009	—	—	—	—	—	—	—	—	—	—		Free
"Dancing Shoes"	2009	—	—	—	—	—	—	—	—	—	—		Free
"Not Over You"	2011	18	1	9	37	23	—	16	12	8	—	RIAA: 4× Platinum; ARIA: Platinum; RMNZ: Gold	Sweeter
"Sweeter"	2012	— (Note: "Sweeter" did not chart on the Billboard Hot 100 but did peak at number 16 on Bubbling Under Hot 100 Singles chart, which is an extension of the Hot 100.)	18	—	—	—	—	76	—	—	—		Sweeter
"Soldier"	2012	—	26	—	—	—	—	30	—	—	59	RIAA: Gold	Sweeter
"Best I Ever Had"	2013	75	14	—	—	48	—	44	—	—	80	RIAA: Gold	Make a Move
"Make a Move"	2013	—	23	—	—	—	—	—	—	—	—		Make a Move
"You Got Me"	2014	—	—	—	—	—	—	—	—	—	—		Finest Hour: The Best of Gavin DeGraw
"Fire"	2014	—	29	—	—	—	—	81	—	—	—		Finest Hour: The Best of Gavin DeGraw
"She Sets the City on Fire"	2016	—	14	—	—	—	—	—	—	—	—	RIAA: Gold	Something Worth Saving
"Making Love with the Radio On"	2016	—	32	—	—	—	—	—	—	—	—		Something Worth Saving

== Tours ==
Headlining

- Gavin Degraw Live in Concert (2004)
- Chariot Stripped Tour (2005)
- Gavin Degraw in Concert (2008)
- Where It Began Tour (2009)
- Sweeter Tour (2012)
- Make a Move Tour (2014)
- An Acoustic Evening with Gavin DeGraw (2017)
- Raw Tour (2017–18)

Co-headlining

- One Tree Hill Concert Tour (with Tyler Hilton and The Wreckers) (2005)
- Howie & Gavin on the Road (with Howie Day) (2005)
- 2009 Summer Tour (with Collective Soul) (2009)
- David Cook & Gavin DeGraw in Concert (with David Cook) (2011)
- Colbie Caillat and Gavin DeGraw in Concert (with Colbie Caillat) (2012)
- 2014 Summer Tour (with Matt Nathanson) (2014)
- Gavin DeGraw & Andy Grammer: Live in Concert (with Andy Grammer) (2016)
- 2018 Summer Tour (with Philip Phillips) (2018)

Opening act

- Chasing Daylight World Tour (for Sister Hazel) (2003)
- Songs About Jane Tour (for Maroon 5) (2003)
- Everywhere For Everyone Tour (for the Barenaked Ladies) (2004)
- Virgin College Mega Tour (for Michelle Branch) (2004)
- Bonez Tour (for Avril Lavigne) (2005)
- Summer Tour 2005 (for The Allman Brothers Band) (2005)
- The Circle Tour (for Bon Jovi) (2010)
- 2011 Summer Tour (for Train and Maroon 5) (2011)
- Mermaids of Alcatraz Tour (for Train) (2013)
- Billy Joel in Concert (for Billy Joel) (2014, 2015, 2019)
- Rock This Country Tour (for Shania Twain) (2015)
- All the Feels Tour (for Needtobreathe) (2017)
- Summer Plays On Tour (for Lady A and Darius Rucker) (2018)
- Full Circle Tour - Spring 2022 performing new album Face The River.
- USA Summer Tour - August 2023
- European Tour - September 17 - October 19, 2023
- New York City Residency at the Cafe Carlyle, December 12–16, 2023

== Awards and nominations ==
Year	Association	Category	Nominated work	Result
2004	College Music Awards	Best Male Rock Artist	Himself	Nominated
2004	Mikie Awards	Male Artist of the Year	Himself	Nominated
2004	Mikie Awards	Song of the Year	"I Don't Want To Be"	Nominated
2005	Billboard Music Award	Top Soundtrack Single of the Year	"I Don't Want To Be"	Nominated
2005	Radio Music Award	Song of the Year/Mainstream Top 40 Radio	"I Don't Want To Be"	Nominated
2005	Teen Choice Award	Choice Music: Rock Track	"I Don't Want To Be"	Nominated
2005	Teen Choice Award	Choice Music: Male Breakout Artist	Himself	Nominated
2005	Groovevolt Music and Fashion Awards	Best Song Performance – Male	"I Don't Want To Be"	Nominated
2005	Groovevolt Music and Fashion Awards	Best Album – Male	Chariot (Stripped)	Nominated
2005	World Music Awards	World's Best Selling Pop/Rock Artist	Himself	Nominated
2006	BMI Pop Awards	Award-Winning Song	"Chariot"	Won
2006	BMI Pop Awards	Award-Winning Song	"I Don't Want to Be"	Won
2006	BDSCertified Spin Awards	400,000 Spins	"I Don't Want to Be"	Won
2006	Danish Music Awards	Best International Album	Chariot	Nominated
2006	Groovevolt Music and Fashion Awards	Best Pop Song Performance – Male	"Follow Through"	Nominated
2009	BMI Pop Awards	Award-Winning Song	"In Love with a Girl"	Won
2011	BDSCertified Spin Awards	500,000 Spins	"I Don't Want to Be"	Won
2013	New Music Awards	AC Male Artist of the Year	Himself	Won
2014	Grammy Awards	Best Song Written for Visual Media	"We Both Know"	Nominated

== See also ==
- List of Berklee College of Music alumni
- List of Ithaca College alumni
- List of people from New York
- List of singer-songwriters
