= Make a Move (album) =

2013 album by Gavin DeGraw

Studio album by Gavin DeGraw
- Released: October 11, 2013
- Recorded: 2013
- Genre: Pop rock; blue-eyed soul
- Length: 38:49
- Label: RCA
- Producer: Alex Bilo; Benny Blanco; busbee; DreZa; Julian Emery; Jeff Halatrax; Martin Johnson; Kyle Moorman; Brandon Paddock; RoboPop; Kevin Rudolf; Ryan Tedder; Butch Walker; Noel Zancanella

Gavin DeGraw chronology
Sweeter (2011)	Make a Move (2013)	Finest Hour: The Best of Gavin DeGraw (2014)

Singles from Make a Move
- 1. "Best I Ever Had" Released: June 18, 2013; 2. "Make a Move" Released: November 2013

Make a Move is the fifth studio album by American singer-songwriter Gavin DeGraw. It was released initially in Germany on October 11, 2013, and in the US on October 15, 2013, in the United States by RCA Records.

For the album DeGraw worked with several producers, including busbee, Martin Johnson, Ryan Tedder, Butch Walker, Benny Blanco, and Kevin Rudolf.

== Singles ==
The album's first single "Best I Ever Had" was released on June 18, 2013. It was written by DeGraw and Martin Johnson of Boys Like Girls. The single reached a peak position of number 28 on Billboard's Adult Contemporary chart. It was covered by George Horga Jr. and Juhi in The Battle rounds at the fifth season of The Voice.

== Track listing ==
No.	Title	Writer(s)	Producer(s)	Length
1.	"Best I Ever Had"	Gavin DeGraw; Martin Johnson	Johnson; Kyle Moorman^{[a]}; Brandon Paddock^{[a]}	3:46
2.	"Make a Move"	DeGraw; Benjamin Levin; Daniel Omelio; Ammar Malik	Benny Blanco; Robopop; Emily Wright^{[b]}	3:17
3.	"Finest Hour"	DeGraw; Ryan Tedder	Tedder; Noel Zancanella	3:32
4.	"I'm Gonna Try"	DeGraw; David Hodges	Butch Walker	3:45
5.	"Who's Gonna Save Us"	DeGraw; busbee	busbee; DreZa	3:14
6.	"Everything Will Change"	DeGraw Johnson	Johnson; Moorman^{[a]}; Paddock^{[a]}	3:47
7.	"Need"	DeGraw; Tedder	Tedder; Zancanella	3:47
8.	"Heartbreak"	DeGraw; Chris DeStefano	Walker	3:29
9.	"Every Little Bit"	DeGraw; Julian Emery; Jim Irvin	Emery	3:36
10.	"Different for Girls"	DeGraw; Kevin Rudolf	Rudolf; Alex Bilo^{[a]}, Jeff Halatrax^{[a]}	3:40
11.	"Leading Man"	DeGraw; Rudolf	Rudolf	2:56

Notes

- ^{^[a]} signifies an additional producer
- ^{^[b]} signifies a vocal producer

== Charts ==
Chart (2013)	Peak position
Belgian Albums (Ultratop Flanders)	121
Canadian Albums Chart	19
Danish Albums (Hitlisten)	21
Dutch Albums (Album Top 100)	18
Swedish Albums (Sverigetopplistan)	39
Swiss Albums (Schweizer Hitparade)	55
UK Albums Chart	79
US Billboard 200	13

== Release history ==
Region	Date	Label	Format	Edition(s)	Catalog
Germany	October 11, 2013	Sony Music Entertainment	CD, digital download	Standard	
United Kingdom	October 14, 2013	RCA Records	CD, digital download	Standard	
Canada	October 15, 2013	Sony Music Entertainment	CD, digital download	Standard	
United States	October 15, 2013	RCA Records	CD, digital download	Standard	

== Personnel ==
- Smith Carlson - Engineer
