= Gavin DeGraw (album) =

Album by Gavin DeGraw

Studio album by Gavin DeGraw
- Released: May 6, 2008
- Recorded: 2007–2008
- Genre: Pop rock
- Length: 46:15
- Label: J
- Producer: Howard Benson

Gavin DeGraw chronology
Chariot (2003)	Gavin DeGraw (2008)	Free (2009)

Singles from Gavin DeGraw
- 1. "In Love with a Girl" Released: February 11, 2008; 2. "She Holds a Key" Released: July 21, 2008; 3. "Cheated on Me" Released: September 15, 2008; 4. "I Have You to Thank" Released: January 5, 2009

Gavin DeGraw is the second album by American singer-songwriter Gavin DeGraw. The album was released on May 6, 2008, by J Records. The album debuted at number seven on the U.S. Billboard 200 albums chart, selling 66,000 copies the first week.

== Album information ==
The album features an extended and re-recorded version of the song "We Belong Together", which was a single in 2006 and was featured on the soundtrack to the film of Tristan & Isolde. One week before its release, the album was put up in full to stream on Imeem.com on April 29, 2008.

=== Singles ===
The album was preceded by the single "In Love with a Girl", which became his second-biggest single ever since his debut "I Don't Want to Be", and fourth Top 40 hit in the United States, peaking at number twenty-four. Outside the U.S., the song was successful in the Netherlands too, reaching number twenty-two.

Soon followed the release of "Cheated on Me", DeGraw's second single from the album, only released in North America, of which the music video was released on September 30, 2008. The single failed to generate any interest in North America. At the same time, "She Holds a Key" was chosen as the second single in the rest of the world, which only charted in the Netherlands, becoming his fifth Top 40 hit there, peaking at number twenty-nine. As the third worldwide single, "I Have You to Thank" was released in January 2009.

== Track listing ==
All songs written by Gavin DeGraw.

1. "In Love with a Girl" – 3:27
2. "Next to Me (Wait a Minute, Sister)" – 3:26
3. "Cheated on Me" – 3:40
4. "I Have You to Thank" – 3:27
5. "Cop Stop" – 3:24
6. "Young Love" – 4:09
7. "Medicate the Kids" – 3:20
8. "Relative" – 4:13
9. "She Holds a Key" – 3:51
10. "Untamed" – 4:00
11. "Let It Go" – 3:50
12. "We Belong Together" – 5:28
- Target stores released a deluxe edition of this album with a bonus DVD including a feature called "Up Close with Gavin DeGraw" and the music video for "In Love With a Girl." The cover of the deluxe edition has a purple-red background instead of blue.

== Critical reception ==
Professional ratings
Aggregate scores
Source	Rating
Metacritic	(60/100)
Review scores
Source	Rating
Allmusic	2.5/5 stars
Billboard	(favorable)
The Boston Globe	(positive)
Common Sense Media	3/5 stars
Entertainment Weekly	B−
Hot Press	(2.5/5)
The New York Times	(average)
Paste	(positive)
Rolling Stone	2.5/5 stars

Maverick magazine gave the album four-out-of-five stars, saying it is "resonating rock release and a classic depiction of Gavin’s sentimental views on love and life and champions catchy, lyrical hooks, music with meaning, guitar riffs and a voice that is a real pleasure to listen to."

== Charts ==
=== Weekly charts ===
Weekly chart performance
Chart (2008)	Peak position
Australian Hitseekers Albums (ARIA)	7
Belgian Albums (Ultratop Flanders)	82
Canadian Albums (Billboard)	21
Danish Albums (Hitlisten)	3
Dutch Albums (Album Top 100)	8
Finnish Albums (Suomen virallinen lista)	36
Italian Albums (FIMI)	44
Norwegian Albums (VG-lista)	35
Swedish Albums (Sverigetopplistan)	13
Swiss Albums (Schweizer Hitparade)	23
UK Country Albums (Official Charts)	5
US Billboard 200	7

=== Year-end charts ===
Year-end chart performance
Chart (2008)	Position
Danish Albums (Hitlisten)	78
