= Best I Ever Had (Gavin DeGraw song) =

Single by Gavin DeGraw

from the album Make a Move
- Released: June 18, 2013
- Recorded: 2013
- Genre: Pop rock, blue-eyed soul
- Length: 3:46
- Label: RCA
- Songwriters: Gavin DeGraw, Martin Johnson
- Producers: Martin Johnson, Kyle Moorman, Brandon Paddock

"Best I Ever Had" is a song by American recording artist Gavin DeGraw. It was released as the lead single from his fifth studio album, Make a Move, on October 15, 2013. The song was written by DeGraw and Martin Johnson, and produced by Johnson, Kyle Moorman, and Brandon Paddock. The song evokes the thoughts that someone has when missing a loved one. The accompanying music video shows DeGraw singing by himself with scenes of past memories of his love interest.

== Background ==
"Best I Ever Had" was the first single from singer-songwriter Gavin DeGraw's fifth album, Make a Move. It was a collaboration with Boys Like Girls' lead singer and songwriter Martin Johnson. DeGraw explains the beginning of the creation of this song by saying, "I'm sitting in the room with Martin Johnson, the guy I'd been writing with before who's really gifted, and he's like, 'Hey man, what do you think of this track?' He just starts playing this jangle-y, uptempo kind of thing, which ultimately was the foundation for 'Best I Ever Had.'"

== Music video ==
The music video was released on DeGraw's YouTube page on YouTube/VEVO on August 6, 2013. It features shots of DeGraw, televisions showing videos of him singing, and past memories of his love interest. By the end of the video, he is singing with a band to a full audience.

== Cover versions ==
The song was covered by George Horga Jr. and Juhi in the Battle Rounds at the fifth season of The Voice.

== Charts ==
=== Weekly charts ===
Chart (2013)	Peak position
Belgium (Ultratip Bubbling Under Flanders)	3
Canada Hot 100 (Billboard)	48
Netherlands (Dutch Top 40)	22
Netherlands (Single Top 100)	44
US Billboard Hot 100	75
US Adult Contemporary (Billboard)	24
US Adult Pop Airplay (Billboard)	14

=== Year-end charts ===
Chart (2013)	Position
Netherlands (Dutch Top 40)	108
US Adult Top 40 (Billboard)	49

== Certifications ==
Region	Certification	Certified units/sales
United States (RIAA)	Gold	500,000^{‡}
^{‡} Sales+streaming figures based on certification alone.

== Release history ==
Release dates and formats for "Best I Ever Had"
Region	Date	Format	Label(s)	Ref.
United States	August 26, 2013	Mainstream airplay	RCA	
